= Renfrewshire =

Council area of Scotland

Renfrewshire Siorrachd Rinn Friù (Scottish Gaelic)
- Council area
- Coat of arms

- Renfrewshire shown within Scotland
- Coordinates: 55.829858°N 4.542838°W
- Sovereign state: United Kingdom
- Country: Scotland
- Lieutenancy area: Renfrewshire
- Unitary authority: 1 April 1996
- Administrative HQ: Renfrewshire House, Paisley

Government
  - Type: Council
  - Body: Renfrewshire Council
  - Control: No overall control
  - MPs: 2 MPs: Alison Taylor (L); Johanna Baxter (L)
  - MSPs: 3 MSPs: Michelle Campbell (SNP); George Adam (SNP); Tom Arthur (SNP)

Area
  - Total: 101 sq mi (261 km^{2})
  - Rank: 24th

Population (2024)
  - Total: 189,170
  - Rank: 9th
  - Density: 1,870/sq mi (723/km^{2})
- Time zone: UTC+0 (GMT)
  - Summer (DST): UTC+1 (BST)
- ISO 3166 code: GB-RFW
- GSS code: S12000038
- Website: renfrewshire.gov.uk

Renfrewshire (/ˈrɛnfruːʃɪər, -ʃər/ REN-froo-sheer, -shər; Scots: Renfrewshire; Scottish Gaelic: Siorrachd Rinn Friù) is one of the 32 council areas of Scotland. Renfrewshire is located in the west central Lowlands. It borders East Renfrewshire, Glasgow, Inverclyde, North Ayrshire and West Dunbartonshire, and lies on the southern bank of the River Clyde. The current council area of Renfrewshire was established in 1996. The town of Paisley is the area's main settlement and centre of local government. The area also contains the historic county town of Renfrew.

The council area has the same name as the historic county of Renfrewshire, which had been abolished for local government purposes in 1975, but the modern council area only covers the central part of the historic county. The eastern part of the pre-1975 county is covered by the East Renfrewshire council area, and the western part by the Inverclyde council area.

The term Renfrewshire may also be used to refer to the larger historic county, which was established in the fifteenth century. The three council areas of Renfrewshire, Inverclyde, and East Renfrewshire together form the Renfrewshire lieutenancy area. The same area also has a joint valuation board area for electoral registration and local tax valuation purposes. The three council areas together are sometimes referred to as Greater Renfrewshire to distinguish them from the council area called Renfrewshire.

== Toponymy ==
The name Renfrewshire derives from being the shire (the area controlled by a sheriff) administered from the royal burgh of Renfrew. The name Renfrew has been attested since the Roman occupation of Britain. The name is believed to originate from Common Brittonic/Cumbric, from ren, as in Scottish Gaelic: rinn, or as in Welsh: rhyn (a point or cape of land) and from frew, as in Welsh: fraw, or ffrau (flow of water). This suggests a point of land near the flow of water, such as at the confluence of the Cart and Clyde rivers.

== History ==
The historic county of Renfrewshire was abolished for local government purposes in 1975. The county was divided to become three of the nineteen districts in the Strathclyde region, being Eastwood, Inverclyde, and Renfrew.

In the debates leading to the local government reforms of the Local Government etc. (Scotland) Act 1994, the government initially proposed replacing these three districts with two council areas: "West Renfrewshire", covering Inverclyde district and the western parts of Renfrew district (including Paisley, Johnstone, and Renfrew), and "East Renfrewshire", covering Eastwood district and the eastern parts of Renfrew district (including Barrhead, Neilston and Ralston). The proposals were criticised, with West Renfrewshire having three times the population of East Renfrewshire; the accusation was made in parliament that the proposed changes constituted gerrymandering, with East Renfrewshire only being kept separate because it had more Conservative voters.

The proposals were not supported locally, with Inverclyde successfully campaigning to be allowed to form its own council area, and the Ralston area voting in a referendum not to be transferred to East Renfrewshire. When the government conceded to allow Inverclyde to continue as a separate authority, the name West Renfrewshire was dropped. The central district was instead named Renfrewshire, despite only covering the central part of the historic county of that name. The new Renfrewshire covered the former Renfrew district except for the Barrhead electoral division (which also included Neilston) which went instead to East Renfrewshire. The new council areas came into effect on 1 April 1996.

The Braehead shopping centre was built in 1999 straddling the boundary between Renfrewshire and Glasgow, leading to a dispute between the two councils. It was agreed that the boundary should be changed to place the whole centre in one council area, but both authorities wanted it. In 2002, the Local Government Boundary Commission eventually redrew the boundary to include all of the centre in Renfrewshire.

== Settlements ==
The largest settlements in Renfrewshire.

Largest settlements by population:

Settlement	Population (2020)
Paisley	77,270
Renfrew	24,270
Johnstone	15,930
Erskine	15,010
Linwood	8,450
Bishopton	7,920
Houston	6,360
Elderslie	5,480
Bridge of Weir	4,920
Kilbarchan	3,300

== Communities ==
The area is divided into 25 community council areas, 20 of which have community councils as at 2023 (being those with asterisks in the list below):

- Bishopton*
- Bridge of Weir*
- Brookfield*
- Charleston
- Elderslie*
- Erskine*
- Ferguslie*
- Foxbar and Brediland
- Gallowhill
- Glenburn
- Hawkhead and Lochfield*
- Houston*
- Howwood*
- Hunterhill
- Inchinnan*
- Johnstone*
- Kilbarchan*
- Langbank*
- Linwood*
- Lochwinnoch*
- Paisley East and Whitehaugh*
- Paisley North*
- Paisley West and Central*
- Ralston*
- Renfrew*

== Demographics ==
Ethnic Group	2001		2011		2022	
Ethnic Group	Number	%	Number	%	Number	%
White: Total	170,728	98.76%	170,127	97.27%	171,816	94.78%
White: Scottish	161,395	93.36%	159,708	91.31%	147,073	81.13%
White: Other British	5,956	3.45%	5,805	3.32%	12,959	7.15%
White: Irish	1,877	1.09%	1,643	0.94%	1,290	0.71%
White: Gypsy/Traveller (Note: New category created for the 2011 census)	–	–	70	–	70	–
White: Polish	–	–	1,298	0.74%	5,568	3.07%
White: Other	1,500	0.87%	1,603	0.92%	4,853	2.68%
Asian, Asian Scottish or Asian British: Total	1,509	0.87%	3,110	1.78%	5,056	
Asian, Asian Scottish or Asian British: Indian	461	0.27%	1,028	0.59%	1,315	0.73%
Asian, Asian Scottish or Asian British: Pakistani	497	0.29%	965	0.55%	2,338	1.29%
Asian, Asian Scottish or Asian British: Bangladeshi	8	–	19	–	45	–
Asian, Asian Scottish or Asian British: Chinese	440	0.25%	823	0.47%	810	0.45%
Asian, Asian Scottish or Asian British: Asian Other	103	0.06%	275	0.16%	548	0.30%
Black, Black Scottish or Black British (Note: Category restructured for the 2011 census)	30	–	–	–	–	–
African: Total	113	0.07%	804	0.46%	1,439	0.79%
African: African, African Scottish or African British	–	–	782	0.45%	165	0.09%
African: Other African	–	–	22	–	1,274	0.70%
Caribbean or Black: Total	–	–	119	0.07%	163	0.09%
Caribbean	54	–	64	–	68	–
Black	–	–	47	–	15	–
Caribbean or Black: Other	–	–	8	–	80	–
Mixed or multiple ethnic groups: Total	285	0.16%	437	0.25%	1,912	1.05%
Other: Total	148	0.09%	311	0.18%	888	0.49%
Other: Arab	–	–	194	0.11%	329	0.18%
Other: Any other ethnic group	–	–	117	0.07%	559	0.31%
Total:	172,867	100.00%	174,908	100.00%	181,278	100.00%

=== Languages ===
The 2022 Scottish Census reported that out of 178,875 residents aged three and over, 54,274 (30.3%) considered themselves able to speak or read the Scots language.

The 2022 Scottish Census reported that out of 178,868 residents aged three and over, 1,768 (1%) considered themselves able to speak or read Gaelic.

== Culture ==
Paisley Abbey

Renfrewshire contains several places of interest. In the west of Renfrewshire, Castle Semple Loch at Lochwinnoch and the wider Clyde Muirshiel Regional Park are natural areas of interest, as is the Gleniffer Braes country park in the south.

Paisley contains several historic buildings and notable sites, including Paisley Abbey, Paisley Museum and Coats Observatory, Paisley Town Hall, Coats Memorial Church, Sma' Shot Cottages and St Mirren Park (home of St Mirren F.C.). Outside of Paisley, Elderslie, the claimed birthplace of Scottish knight William Wallace, contains a monument in his honour, while the Weaver's Cottage at Kilbarchan is in the care of the National Trust for Scotland. The town of Johnstone is notable for Johnstone Castle, Johnstone High Parish Church and for containing a museum within a supermarket.

The Braehead Arena in Renfrewshire close to the boundary with Glasgow is home to leading professional basketball team, the Scottish Rocks, who compete in the British Basketball League. The arena was also host to the 2000 Ford World Curling Championships.

== Wider politics ==
=== UK Parliament ===
The two parliamentary constituencies covering Renfrewshire are Paisley and Renfrewshire North and Paisley and Renfrewshire South, being represented by Labour Party politicians Alison Taylor and Johanna Baxter of the respectively. Created in 2005, both seats had held by the Labour Party, until they were won by Gavin Newlands and Mhairi Black with swings of over 26% in the SNP landslide at the 2015 general election. Both seats returned to Labour following the 2024 general election.

UK general election results in Renfrewshire 2005–2024
Party	Votes cast						%						Seats					
Party	2005	2010	2015	2017	2019	2024	2005	2010	2015	2017	2019	2024	2005	2010	2015	2017	2019	2024
Labour	38,601	47,455	34,389	29,265	22,409	39,144	49.0	56.7	35.6	33.1	24.2	47.3	2	2	0	0	0	2
Scottish National	14,349	15,621	49,149	34,419	44,990	26,284	18.2	18.6	50.8	39.0	48.5	31.7	0	0	2	2	2	0
Conservative	8,754	10,360	9,709	20,964	18,788	4,878	11.1	12.4	10.0	23.7	20.3	5.9	0	0	0	0	0	0
Liberal Democrat	14,136	8,409	2,065	2,803	6,579	2,689	18.0	10.0	2.1	3.2	7.1	3.2	0	0	0	0	0	0
Others	2,905	1,920	1,376	876	N/A	9,807	3.7	2.3	1.4	1.0	N/A	11.9	0	0	0	0	N/A	0
Margin	24,252	31,834	14,760	5,154	22,581	12,860	30.8	38.1	15.2	5.9	24.3	15.6	2	2	2	2	2	2
Total	78,745	83,765	96,688	88,327	92,766	82,802	100%	100%	100%	100%	100%	100%	2	2	2	2	2	2

=== Scottish Parliament ===
Following the establishment of the Scottish Parliament in 1999, the Labour Party held the three seats covering Renfrewshire, although with lower majorities than their House of Commons equivalents.

Constituency boundaries were redrawn for the 2011 Scottish Parliament election, with the new constituencies of Renfrewshire North and West and Paisley being gained by Derek Mackay and George Adam, who became the first SNP parliamentarians in Renfrewshire. The remaining Labour seat, Renfrewshire South, was gained by the SNP's Tom Arthur at the 2016 Scottish election. Arthur and Adam were re-elected in 2021 winning over half the vote in their respective seats, while Mackay was replaced by Renfrewshire Councillor Natalie Don.

For the 2026 Scottish Parliament election constituency boundaries will again be redrawn for all three seats covering Renfrewshire. The Paisley seat will be retained with amended boundaries, however Renfrewshire North and West and Renfrewshire South are to be replaced by Renfrewshire West and Levern Valley (also covering part of the East Renfrewshire council area) and Renfrewshire North and Cardonald (also covering part of the Glasgow council area).

Renfrewshire is also contained with the West Scotland region which elects seven additional members.

=== Referendum results ===
A majority of Renfrewshire rejected independence in the 2014 Scottish independence referendum, although with 55,466 (47.2%) votes cast in favour and 62,067 (52.8%) against, the Yes vote was higher than the national result. The turnout was 117,612 or 87.3%, the highest recorded in the democratic era.

With a turnout of 69.2% (88,197), Renfrewshire voted to remain in the 2016 European Union membership referendum with 64.8% (57,119) of votes cast in favour of remaining while 35.2% (31,010) were for leaving. This was the sixth highest vote for Remain out of Scotland's 32 councils.

== Education ==
Renfrewshire contains the University of the West of Scotland, a new university that was granted university status in 1992 as the University of Paisley. Prior to this, the Paisley Technical College and School of Art was a Central Institution or polytechnic. In 2007 the university merged with Bell College, a further education college in Hamilton, South Lanarkshire and the UWS name was adopted. The university today has sites across the west of Scotland, notably also in Ayr and a joint campus in Dumfries; the main campus remains in Paisley.

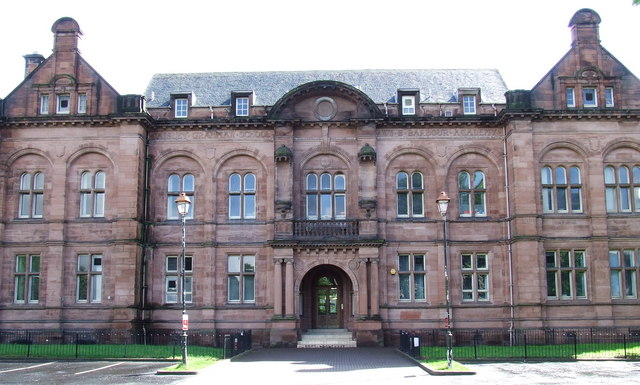
Paisley Grammar School

Further education is provided by Paisley Campus of West College Scotland in Paisley, which caters to around 20,000 students. The college also has sites in Inverclyde and West Dumbartonshire.

Renfrewshire contains eleven state secondary schools: Castlehead High School, Gleniffer High School, Gryffe High School, Johnstone High School, Linwood High School, Paisley Grammar School, Park Mains High School, Renfrew High School, St Andrew's Academy, St Benedict's High School, and Trinity High School. It also has 51 primary schools and three schools for children with additional support needs.

== Transport ==
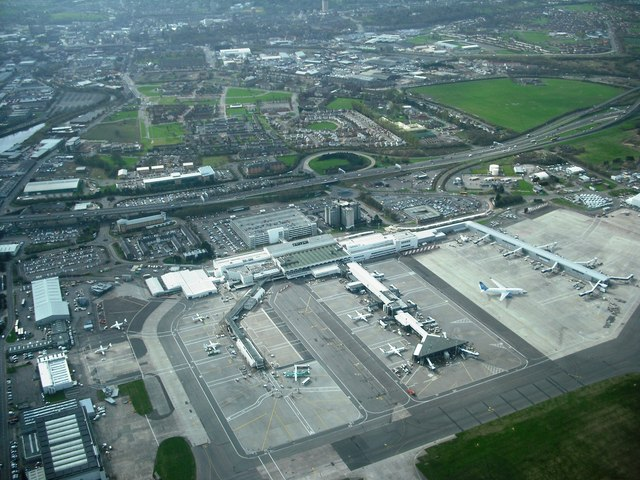
Glasgow International Airport

Renfrewshire is home to Scotland's second busiest airport, Glasgow International Airport, at Abbotsinch between Paisley and Renfrew. The presence of the airport and the proximity to Glasgow means that Renfrewshire supports one of the busiest transport infrastructures in Scotland.

The airport is served by the M8 motorway, which terminates in the area, just east of Langbank, and is a major artery between northwest and southwest Scotland, via the Erskine Bridge.

Developments to ease traffic flow have included a lifting of tolls on the Erskine Bridge, original plans to extend the rail network to connect to the airport have been cancelled and the latest suggestion in 2019 is a metro line connecting Paisley to the airport then on to Glasgow via Braehead. Also the M74 extension was completed to handle traffic from Renfrewshire heading south, diverting it away from Glasgow city centre. Renfrewshire also has bus links provided by FirstGroup, McGill's Bus Services and other smaller operators.

== Places of interest ==
- Auchenbathie Tower
- Barr Castle
- Barshaw Park
- Belltrees Peel
- Castle Semple Church
- Castle Semple Loch Peel Tower
- Climbzone
- Clyde Muirshiel Regional Park
- Coats Observatory
- Coats Paisley
- Craigends Yew
- Craigie Linn waterfall
- Erskine Bridge
- Fountain Gardens, Paisley
- Gleniffer Braes
- Johnstone Castle
- Kenmure Hill Temple
- Lagoon Leisure Centre
- Meikle Millbank Mill
- Paisley Abbey
- Paisley Museum and Art Galleries
- Paisley Thread Mill Museum
- Paisley Town Hall
- Ranfurly Castle
- Renfrew Museum
- Robertson Park
- Sma' Shot Cottages
- St Fillan's Kirk, Seat and Well
- St Matthew's Church, Paisley
- St Patrick's Rock
- St Peter's Well, Houston
- Windy Hill
- Weaver's Cottage
