= Coats Paisley =

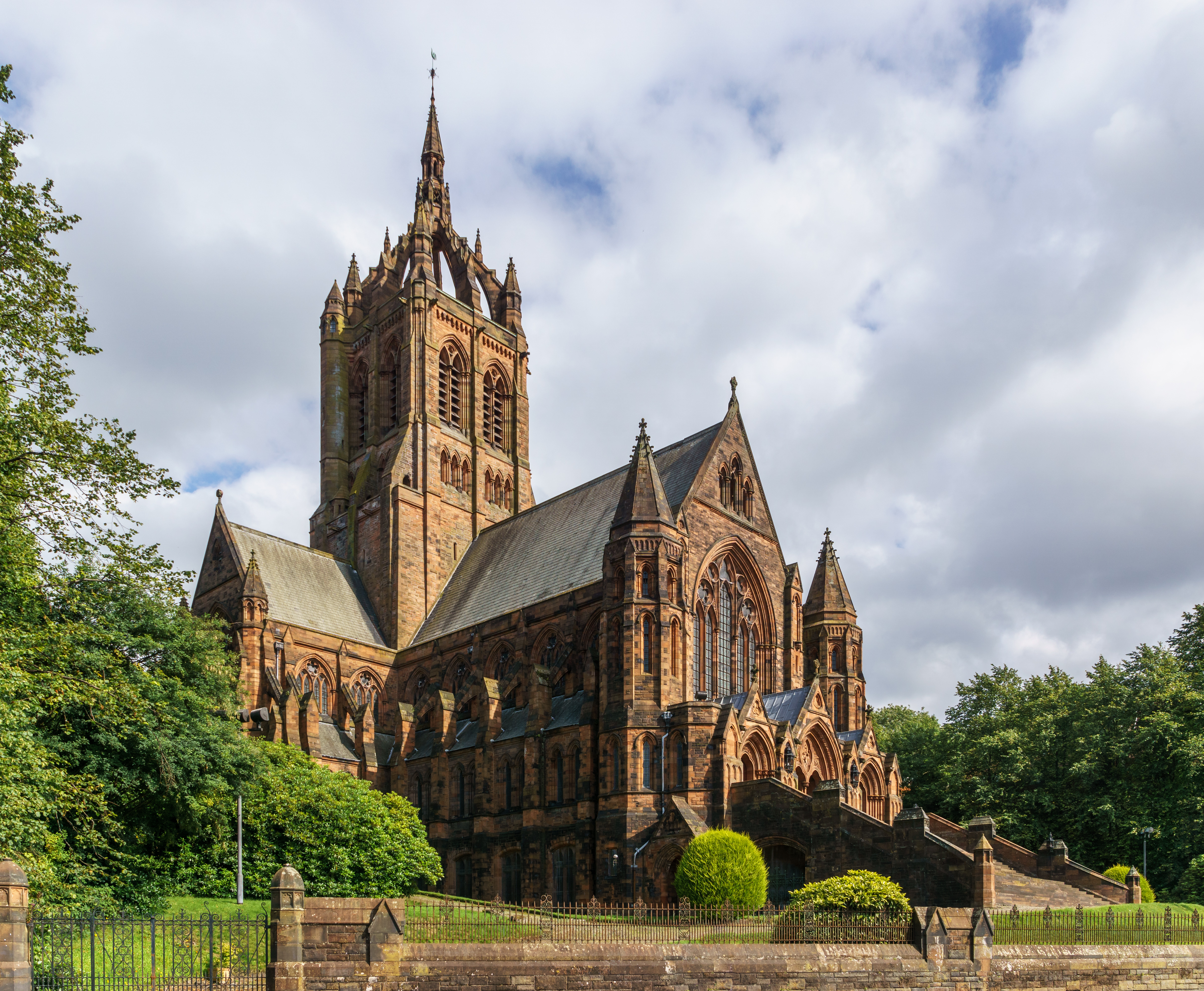

- Location within Renfrewshire
- 55.8448°N 4.4324°W
- Location: High Street; Paisley, Renfrewshire
- Country: Scotland

History
- Founded: May 1894

Architecture
- Functional status: Deconsecrated, now public use
- Heritage designation: Category A
- Architect: Hippolyte Blanc
- Style: Gothic Revival

Coats Paisley is a reception hall which stands at the west end of the High Street in Paisley, Scotland.

The building was the home of Thomas Coats Memorial Baptist Church, colloquially known as the Baptist Cathedral of Europe, until 2018. It has been a dominant feature of the Paisley skyline for over 100 years with its striking crown steeple rising to 60 metres (200 ft) above the ground. The church is a category A listed building.

== Thomas Coats ==
Thomas Coats (1809-1883) co-founder of the world-famous J.&P Coats company was a philanthropist and devout member of the Baptist Church. He was committed to the well-being of his town, involved in the restoration of Paisley Abbey, and in funding projects such as the construction of the Coats Observatory and Paisley Fountain Gardens. After his death in 1883 his close family funded the construction of a Baptist church in his memory.

== History ==
A competition was held in 1885 for the design of the church with the selection of six pre-qualified architects. Construction commenced in late 1885 and was completed by May 1894. Hippolyte Jean Blanc was successful in securing his design.

In light of a dwindling congregation and significant ongoing maintenance costs, the final church service took place in August 2018. A campaign was launched to raise the necessary funds to renovate and re-purpose the building as an arts and culture venue.

== Architecture ==
The church is built in the Gothic Revival style in red sandstone, cruciform in shape with flying buttresses along the nave and transepts. The central tower rises to an open crown steeple. At the front a set of stairs lead to four doorways, occupied by oak doors. There is seating inside for almost 1,000 people under the vaulted ceiling. Other features include mosaics, stencilled decoration, gargoyles, carved marble and alabaster. Above the chancel is a vaulted ceiling decorated with paintings of angels. On either side of the chancel the organ with some 3,040 pipes can be seen. Built by William Hill & Sons, the organ is one of only a few of its kind in Britain which has not been modified.

== Current Use ==
The building is managed by the Coats Memorial Preservation Trust, and hosts weddings, proms and graduations, and corporate events. It is used as a location for television and film. Most recently, the former church and its grounds were used for scenes from Season 5 of the historical drama Outlander.

== See also ==
- Paisley, Renfrewshire
- List of Category A listed buildings in Renfrewshire
- List of listed buildings in Paisley, Renfrewshire

== Bibliography ==
- "Coats Memorial Church". Royal Commission on the Ancient and Historical Monuments of Scotland.
