= David Waterston =

David Waterston may refer to:

- David Waterston (rugby union), New Zealand rugby union coach
- David Waterston (anatomist), Scottish surgeon and anatomist
- Whisky David, born David Waterston, Scottish-born, Spain-based musician
