= Paisley, Renfrewshire =

Town in the west central Lowlands of Scotland

Coordinates: 55°50′44″N 04°25′26″W

Paisley: Scottish Gaelic: Pàislig; Scots: Paisley
- Town
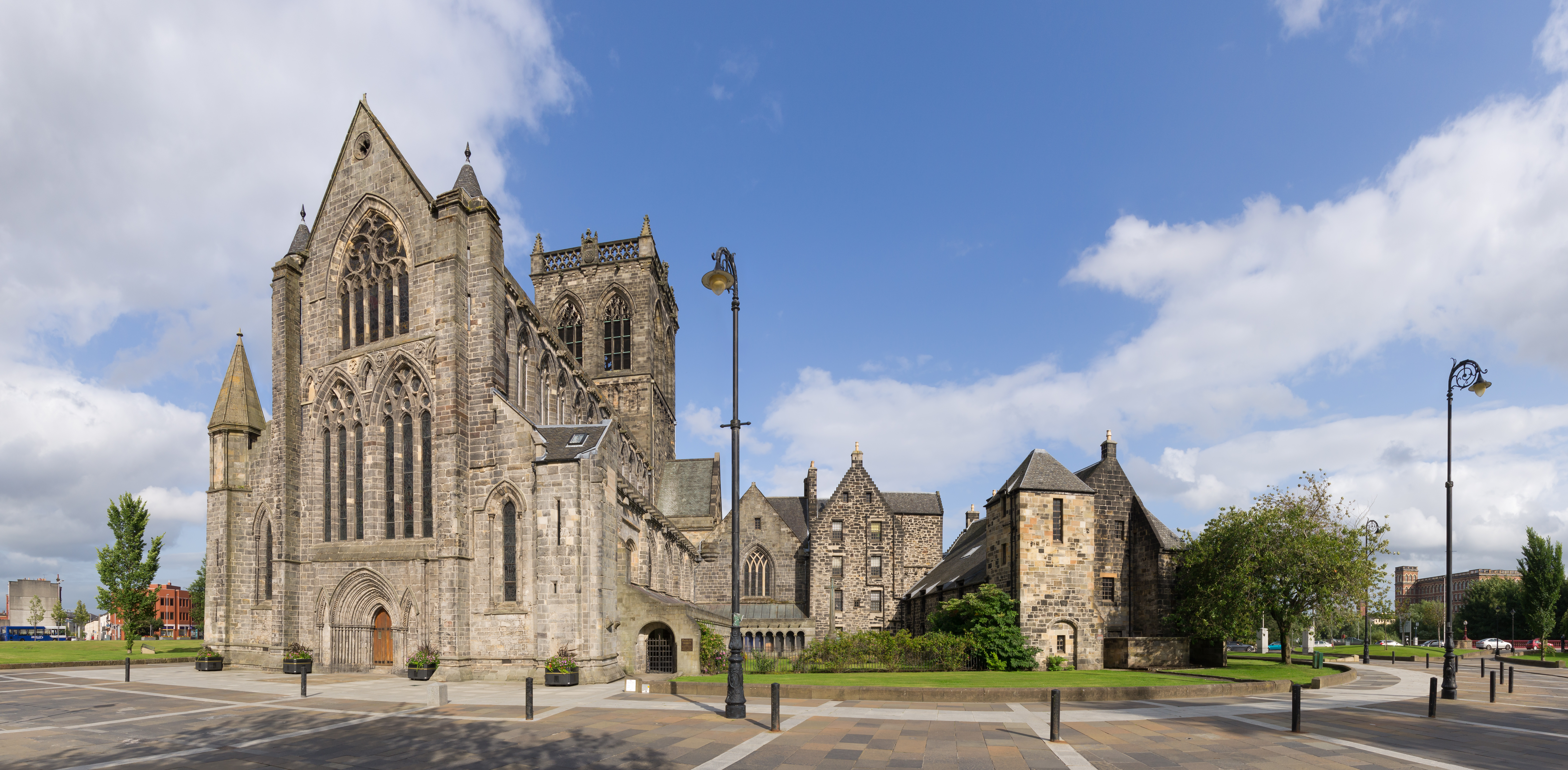
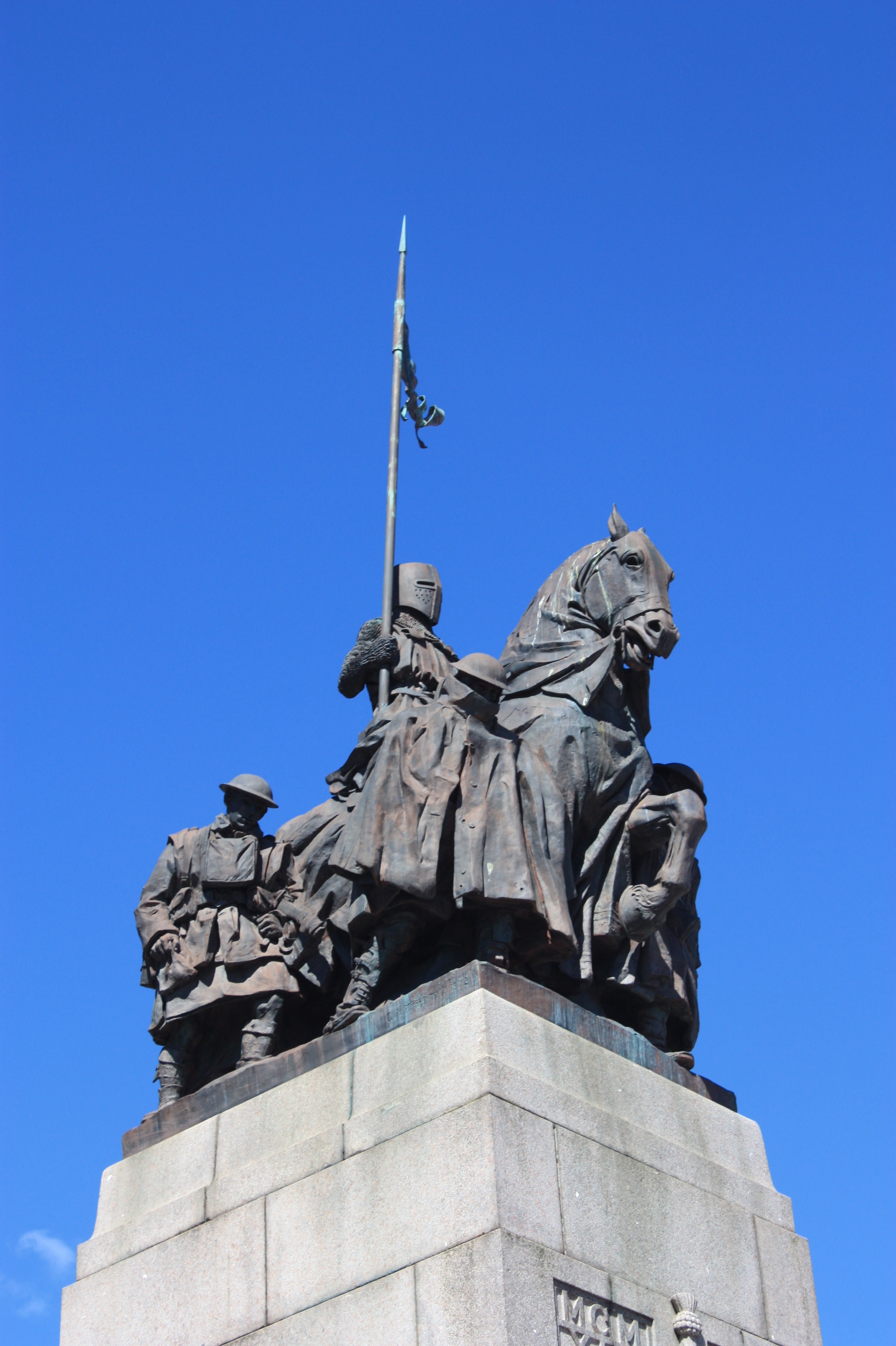
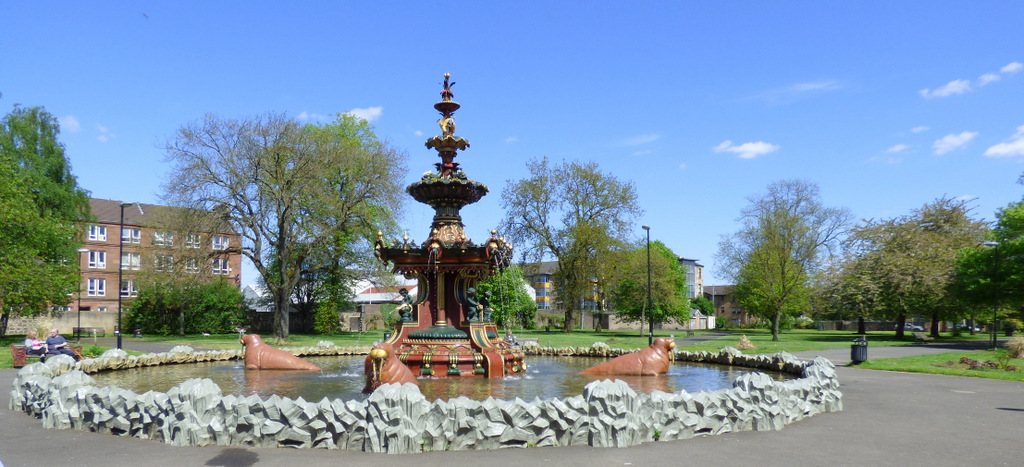
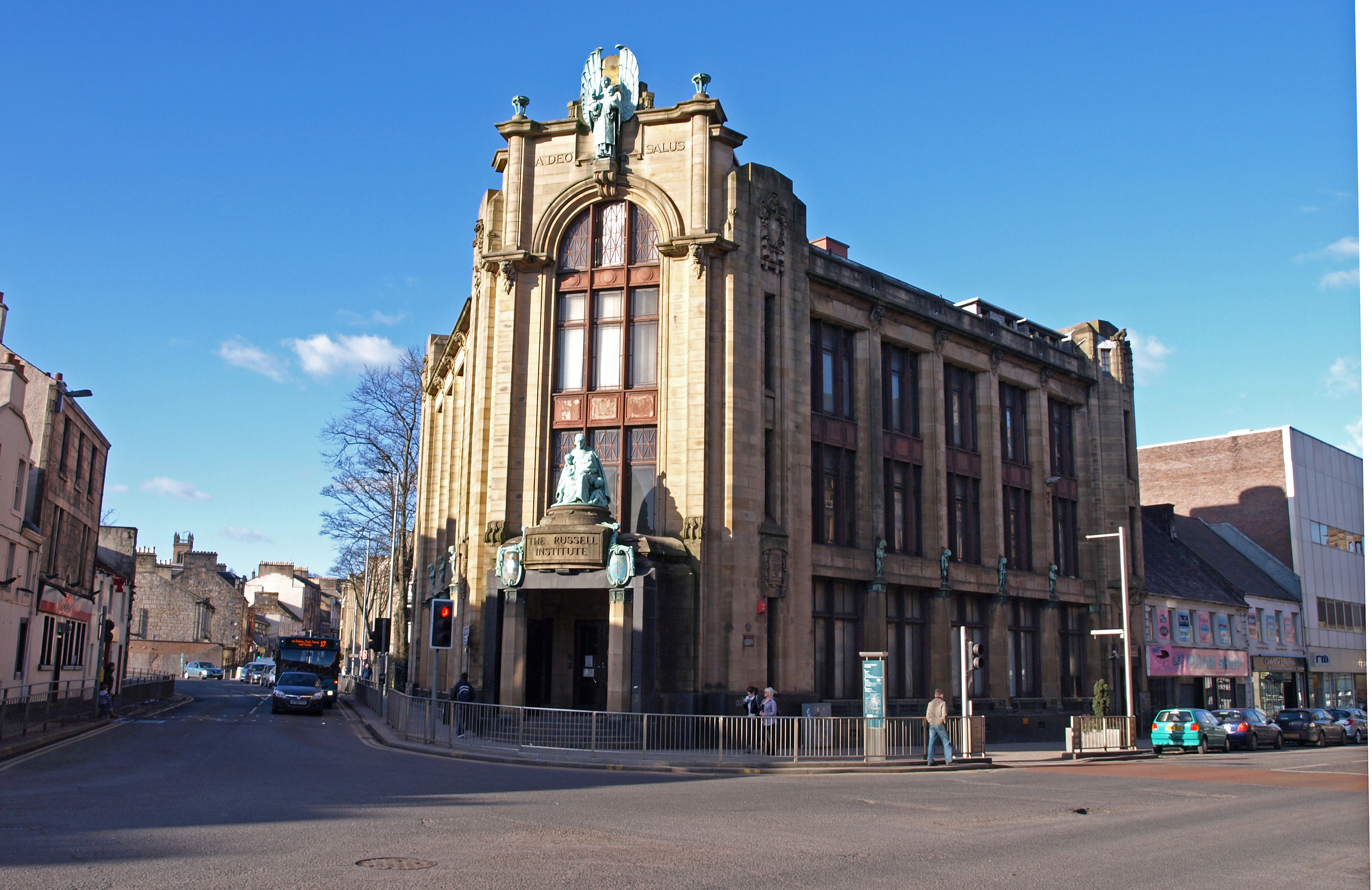
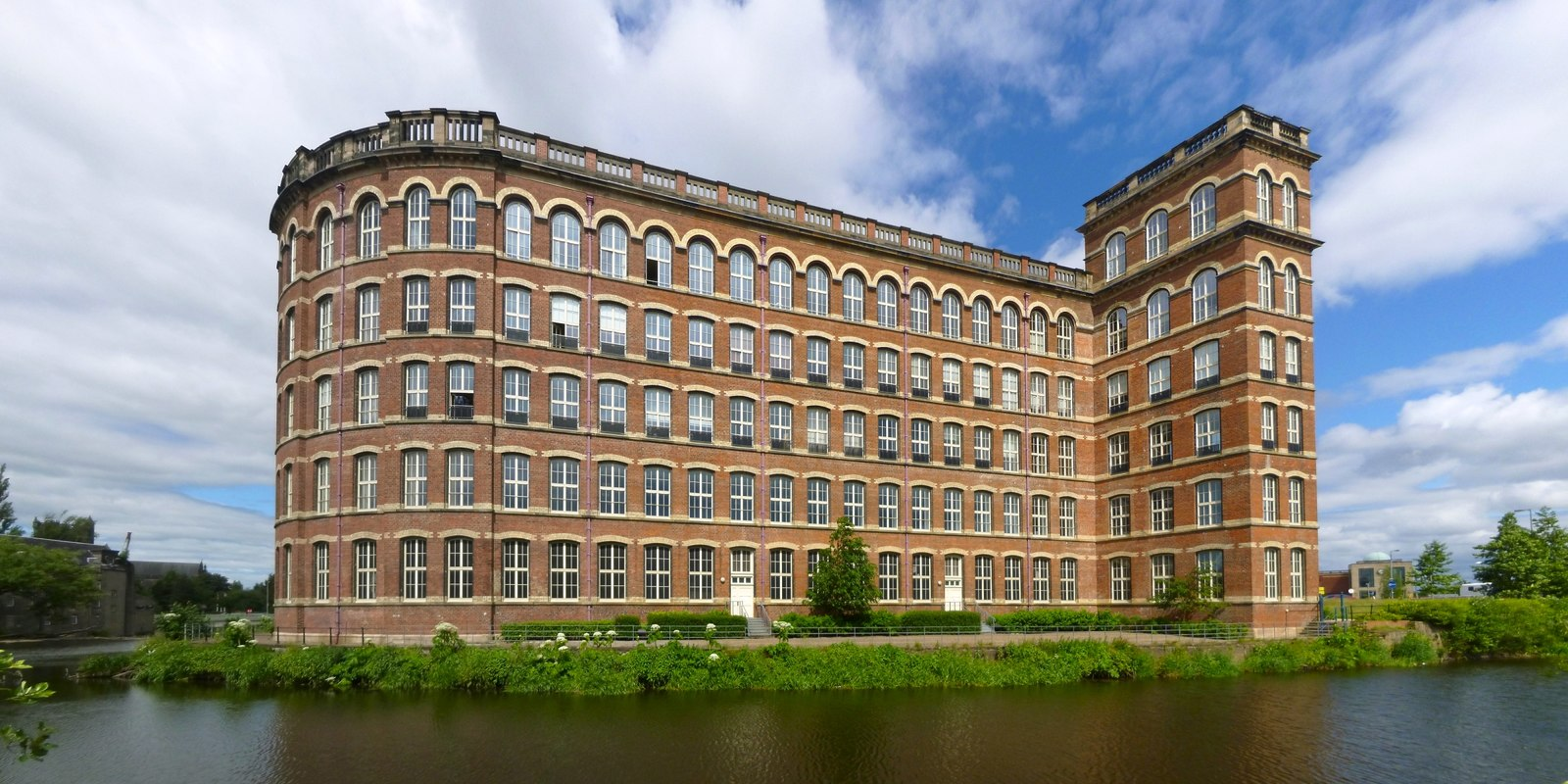
- Paisley Abbey from the west, including St Mirin's chapel and the Place of Paisley War Memorial Fountain Gardens Russell Institute Anchor Mills

- Location within Renfrewshire
- Population: 79,369 (2022)
- OS grid reference: NS485635
  - Edinburgh: 49 mi (79 km) E
- Council area: Renfrewshire
- Lieutenancy area: Renfrewshire
- Country: Scotland
- Sovereign state: United Kingdom
- Post town: PAISLEY
- Postcode district: PA1 – PA3
- Dialling code: 0141 & 01505
- Police: Scotland
- Fire: Scottish
- Ambulance: Scottish
- UK Parliament: Paisley and Renfrewshire North; Paisley and Renfrewshire South
- Scottish Parliament: Paisley West Scotland
- Website: paisley.org.uk

Paisley (/ˈpeɪzli/ PAYZ-lee; Scottish Gaelic: Pàislig [ˈpʰaːʃlɪkʲ]) is a town in Renfrewshire, Scotland. Located north of the Gleniffer Braes and immediately west of Glasgow, it straddles the banks of the White Cart Water, a tributary of the River Clyde. It serves as the administrative centre for the Renfrewshire council area, and is the largest town in the historic county of Renfrewshire, with a population of 79,369 in 2022. As the fifth-largest settlement in Scotland, behind the cities of Glasgow, Edinburgh, Aberdeen and Dundee, it is often cited as Scotland's largest town.

The town became prominent in the 12th century with the establishment of Paisley Abbey, an important religious hub which formerly had control over other local churches. Paisley expanded significantly during the Industrial Revolution as a result of its location beside White Cart Water, with access to the Clyde and nearby ore, mineral and agricultural resources. Factories and mills developed leading to an increase in the town's population. The town's associations with political radicalism were highlighted by its involvement in the Radical War of 1820, with striking weavers being instrumental in the protests.

By the late 19th century Paisley was a global centre of the weaving industry, giving its name to the Paisley shawl and the Paisley pattern. However, industrial decline followed in the 20th century. By 1993, all of Paisley's mills had closed, although they are memorialised in the town's museums and civic history. The town now functions as a regional centre for local governance and services as well as a residential commuting area within the Greater Glasgow urban region.

== History ==
=== Early history ===
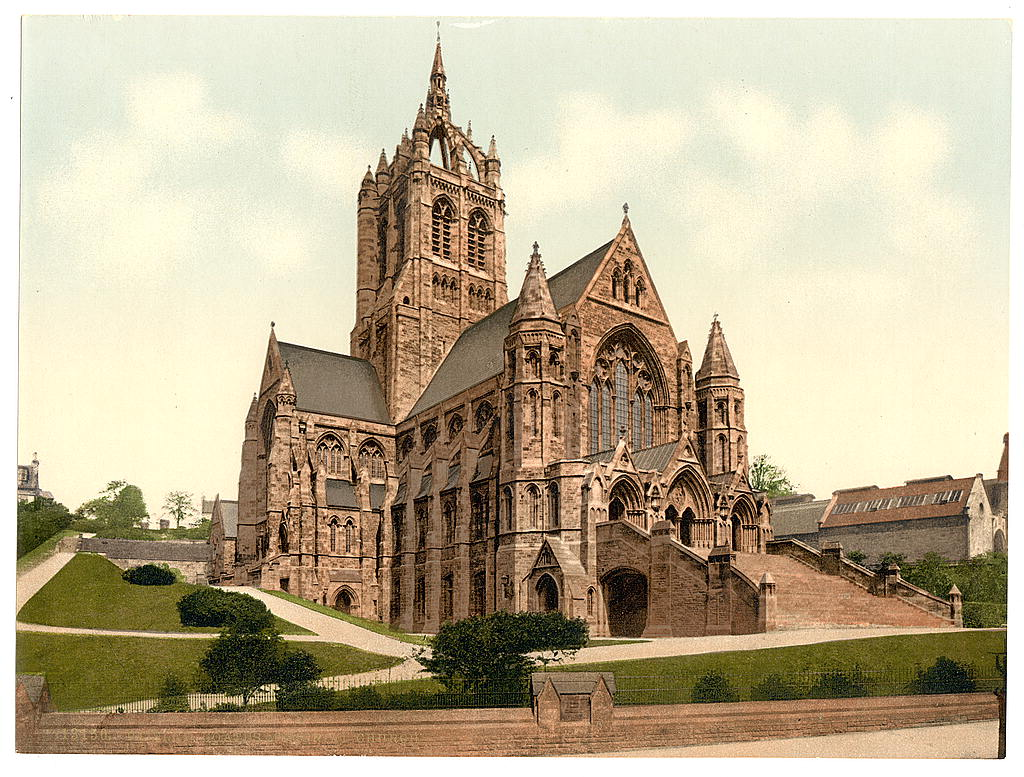
Thomas Coats Memorial Baptist Church, Paisley, Scotland, ca. 1890–1900.

Formerly and variously known as Paislay, Passelet, Passeleth, and Passelay the burgh's name is of uncertain origin; some sources favour the name of the town as having its roots in the Gaelic word Baisleac, which is, like the Cumbric basaleg, derived from basilika. As Paisley was part of the Cumbric speaking Kingdom of Strathclyde, before being absorbed into the Gaelic speaking Kingdom of Alba in the 11th century, and with Cumbric being considered extinct by the 12th century, it is uncertain whether the name of Paisley is of Cumbric or Gaelic origin, due to the linguistic shift that occurred around this time.

The Roman name for Paisley was Vanduara.

Paisley has monastic origins. A chapel is said to have been established by the 6th / 7th-century Irish monk, Saint Mirin, at a site near a waterfall on the White Cart Water known as the Hammils. Though Paisley lacks contemporary documentation it may have been, along with Glasgow and Govan, a major religious centre of the Kingdom of Strathclyde. A priory was established in 1163 from the Cluniac priory at Wenlock in Shropshire, England at the behest of Walter fitz Alan, Steward of Scotland (died 1177). In 1245 this was raised to the status of an abbey. The restored Abbey and adjacent 'Place' (palace), constructed out of part of the medieval claustral buildings, survive as a Church of Scotland parish church. One of Scotland's major religious houses, Paisley Abbey was much favoured by the Bruce and Stewart royal families. King Robert III (1390–1406) was buried in the Abbey. His tomb has not survived, but that of Princess Marjorie Bruce (1296–1316), ancestor of the Stewarts, is one of Scotland's few royal monuments to survive the Reformation.

Paisley coalesced under James II's wish that the lands should become a single regality and, as a result, markets, trading and commerce began to flourish. In 1488 the town's status was raised by James IV to Burgh of barony. Many trades sprang up and the first school was established in 1577 by the Town Council.

==== Witch trials ====
The Paisley witches, also known as the Bargarran witches or the Renfrewshire witches, were tried in Paisley in 1697. Seven were convicted and five were hanged and then burnt on the Gallow Green. Their remains were buried at Maxwelton Cross in the west end of the town. This was the last mass execution for witchcraft in western Europe. A horseshoe was placed on top of the site to lock in the evil. A horseshoe is still visible in the middle of this busy road junction today—though not the original. The modern shoe is made of bronze and bears the inscription, "Pain Inflicted, Suffering Endured, Injustice Done".

=== 18th and 19th centuries ===
==== Industrial Revolution ====
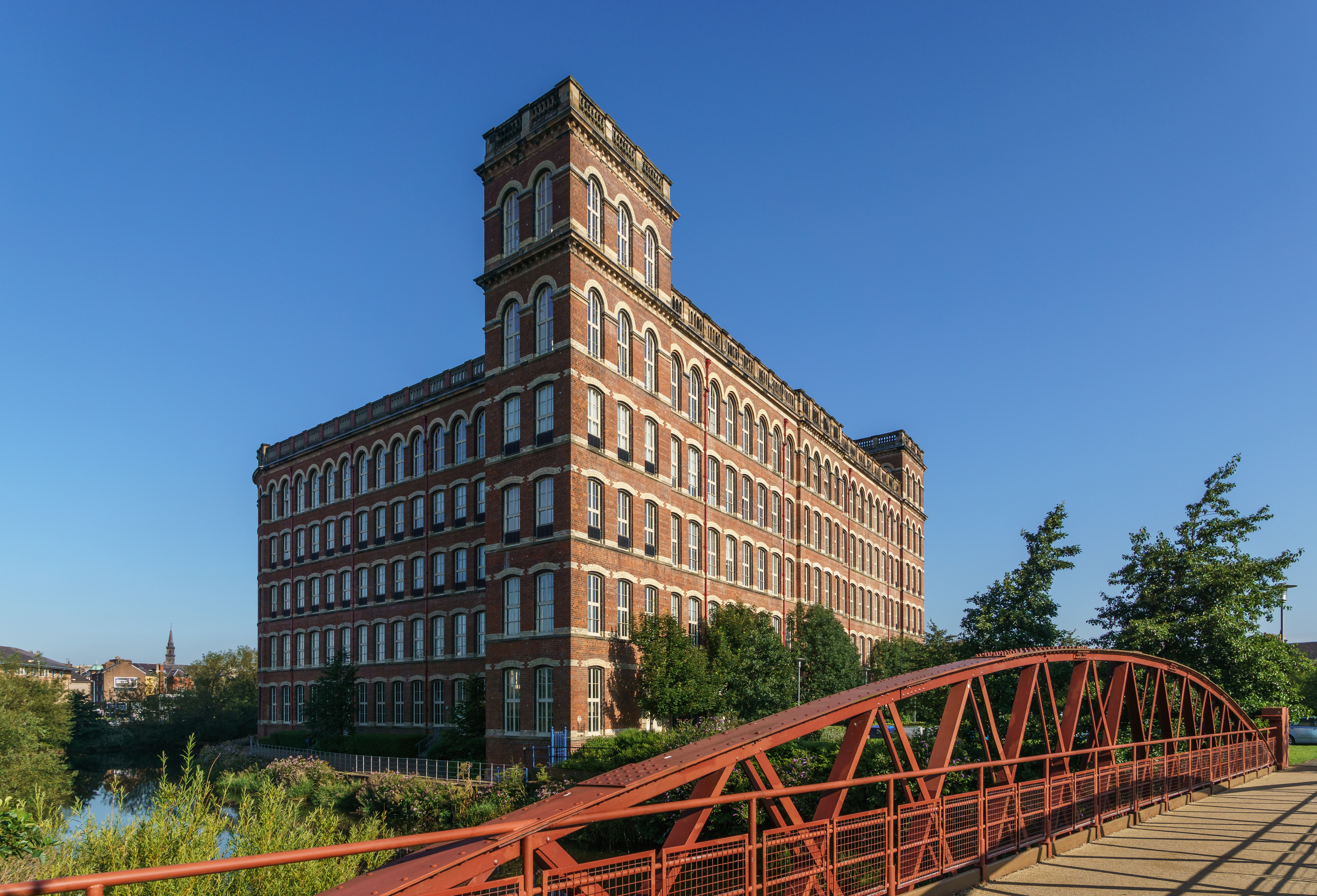
The Anchor Mills (1886) – a remnant of Paisley's Victorian industrial heritage.

The Industrial Revolution, based on the textile industry, turned Paisley from a small market town to an important industrial town in the late 18th century. Initially beginning with small scale weaving (as took place at the Sma’ Shot cottages located in Shuttle Street), Paisley's location and workforce attracted English mill owners; migrants from Ayrshire and the Highlands poured into a town that offered jobs to women and children until silk fell out of fashion in 1790.

The mills switched to the imitation Kashmir (cashmere) shawls called "Paisley". Under the leadership of Thomas Coats (1809–1893), Paisley became the world centre for thread making. Mills and textile factories grew from the late 18th century, coming to dominate the town in the late Victorian era. These include the Anchor and Seedhill mills, as well as the adjacent Atlantic, Pacific and Mile End mills. Another example was Underwood Mill, a cotton mill founded in the 1780s which was later rebuilt as a thread mill in the 1860s (it fell into disuse in the 1970s). Other thread mills include Oakshaw thread works (later used by Arrol-Johnston car manufacturers) and the Burnside thread works.

==== Origins of Paisley Shawls ====
By the mid-19th century weaving had become the town's principal industry. The Paisley weavers' most famous products were the shawls, which bore the Paisley Pattern made fashionable after being worn by a young Queen Victoria. Despite being of a Kashmiri design and manufactured in other parts of Europe, the teardrop-like pattern soon became known by Paisley's name across the western world. Although the shawls dropped out of fashion in the 1870s, the Paisley pattern remains an important symbol of the town: the Paisley Museum maintains a significant collection of the original shawls in this design, and it has been used, for example, in the modern logo of Renfrewshire Council, the local authority.

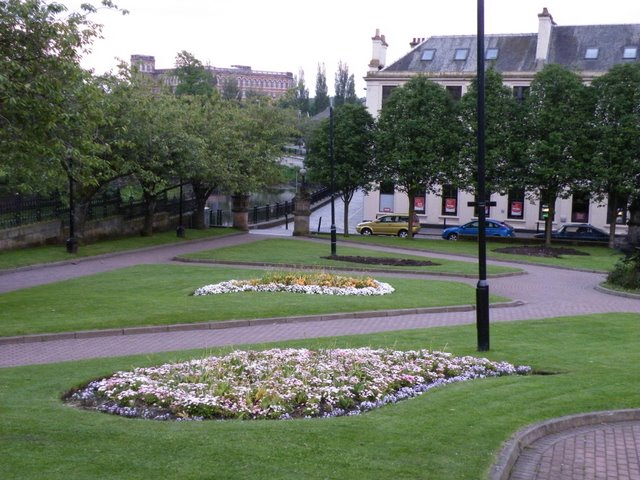
Paisley Pattern flowerbed display in Dunn Square

According to Monique Lévi-Strauss, information on the history of Kashmir shawls' weaving techniques had been described in books, but in a very unintelligible language. John Irwin published a book named Shawls, a Study in Indo-European Influences, in 1955, in which he relates the Kashmir shawl's history and how these shawls spread on the European market during the 19th century. The book showed images of shawls woven in India and also fifteen images of shawls woven in United Kingdom, amongst which is one assigned to a Paisley manufacture, circa 1850. But according to Monique Lévi-Strauss, it resembles by many details a shawl designed by a French designer named Antony Berrus, who was born in 1815 at Nîmes-France and died in 1883.

Berrus studied at the drawing School of Nîmes, before settling in Paris and opening in the French capital his own successful design studio, which employed 200 designers. His textile drawings were sold to Lyon in France, in Scotland, in England, in Austria and also in Kashmir. The fact that shawl patterns drawings were made in Europe, sold there and also to India, made the research work extremely difficult, in order to give a precise location of manufacture. Therefore, in 1973, John Irwin published an update of his book, named as The Kashmir Shawl, in which he removed all the images of the shawls related to a European manufacturing. Monique Lévi-Strauss states that her research led her to focus on the shawls creative industries in France in the 19th century, for the reason that the shawl industries in the United Kingdom (Paisley), Austria (Vienna), Germany (Elberfeld) were inspired by France (Paris) and never the opposite. The author then invited textile specialists from these countries to conduct research on their own field. Monique Lévi-Strauss notes the large influence that Kashmir had on the French shawl creative industries, narrowly linking the French history of Kashmir shawls to the Indian ones.

==== Political radicalism ====
The high-status skilled weavers mobilised themselves in radical protests after 1790, culminating in the failed Radical War between 1816 and 1820. Through its weaving fraternity, Paisley gained notoriety as being a literate and somewhat radical town. Political intrigue, early trades unionism and reforming zeal came together to produce mass demonstrations, cavalry charges down the high street, public riots and trials for treason. Documentation from the period indicates that overthrow of the government was even contemplated by some. The weavers of Paisley were certainly active in the 'Radical War'. The perceived radical nature of the inhabitants prompted the Tory Prime Minister Benjamin Disraeli to comment "Keep your eye on Paisley". The poet Robert Tannahill lived in this setting, working as a weaver. Paisley's annual Sma' Shot Day celebrations held on the first Saturday of July were initiated in 1856 to commemorate a 19th-century dispute between weavers and employers over payment for "sma' shot" – a small cotton thread which, although unseen, was necessary in holding garments together.

A permanent military presence was established in the town with the completion of Paisley Barracks in 1822.

==== Economic change ====
The economic crisis of 1841–43 hit Paisley hard as most of the mills shut down. Among the mill owners, 67 of 112 went bankrupt. A quarter of the population was on poor relief. The Prime Minister, Sir Robert Peel decided to act. He secured additional funds for relief and sent his own representative to the town to supervise its distribution. He convinced Queen Victoria to wear Paisley products in order to popularise the products and stimulate demand. Overproduction, the collapse of the shawl market and a general depression in the textile industry led to technical changes that reduced the importance of weavers. Politically the mill owners remained in control of the town. However, other industrial development continued in and around Paisley outside of textiles, including the development of ironstone and oil shale extraction at Inkerman. The town also had numerous other industries, examples include numerous engineering works, as well as a distillery, ironwork, dye works and tanneries.

The American Civil War of 1861–1865 cut off cotton supplies to the textile mills of Paisley. The mills in 1861 had a stock of cotton in reserve, but by 1862 there were large-scale shortages and shutdowns. There were no alternative jobs for the workers, and local authorities refused to provide relief. Voluntary relief efforts were inadequate, and the unemployed workers refused to go to workhouses. Workers blamed not the United States, but rather the officials in London for their hardship and did not support the idea of war with the United States. Many of the cotton mills either closed or were converted to thread manufacture which became the main focus of the textile industry in Paisley until the 20th century.

=== 20th century ===
==== First World War ====
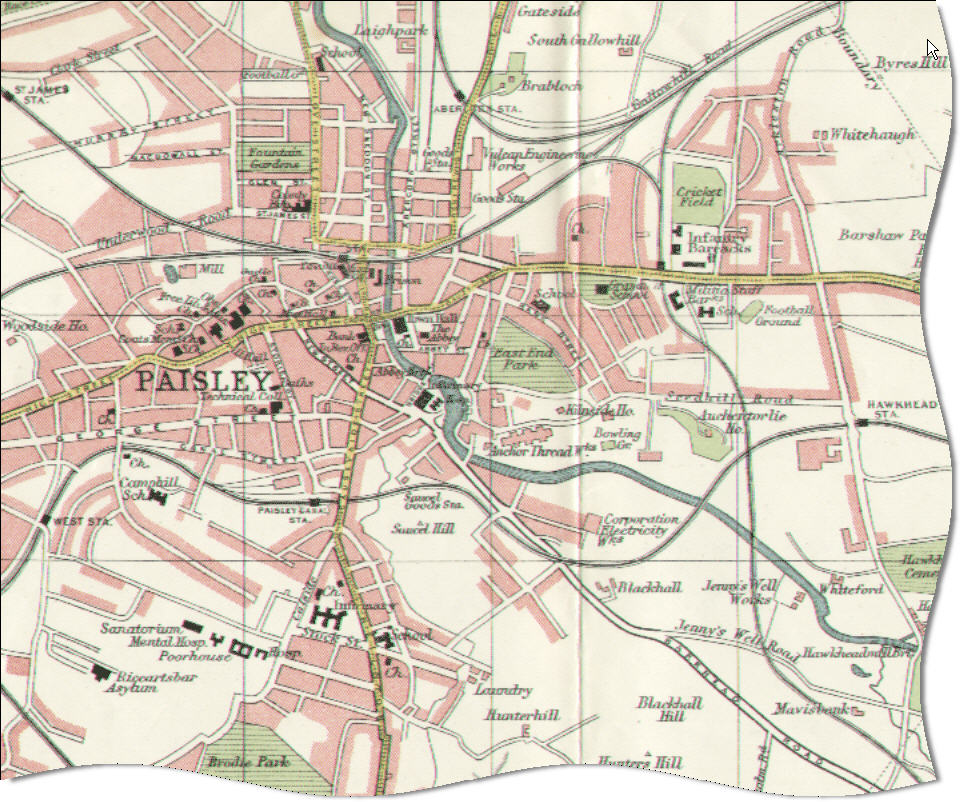
Map of Paisley in the early 1900s

Paisley suffered heavy losses in the First World War. Paisley War Memorial was designed by Sir Robert Lorimer (other sources say Harold Tarbolton) in 1922 and depicts Robert the Bruce going into battle on horseback escorted by footsoldiers dressed as First World War infantry soldiers. It was sculpted by Alice Meredith Williams.

==== Bottled snail incident ====
Paisley was also the site of an incident that gave rise to a major legal precedent. In a Paisley cafe in 1928, a woman claimed to find a dead snail in a bottle of ginger beer, and became ill. She sued the manufacturer for negligence. At the time a manufacturer was considered liable only if there was a contract in place with the harmed party. After Donoghue v Stevenson, a precedent was established that manufacturers (and other "neighbours" or fellow citizens) owe a duty not to do foreseeable harm to others by negligence, regardless of contractual obligations, which paved the way for modern tort law. The case is often called the "Paisley snail".

==== Second World War ====
Owing to its industrial roots, Paisley, like many industrial towns in Renfrewshire, became a target for German Luftwaffe bombers during World War II. Although it was not bombed as heavily as nearby Glasgow (see Clydebank Blitz), air raids still occurred periodically during the early years of the war, killing nearly a hundred people in several separate incidents; on 6 May 1941, a parachute mine was dropped in the early hours of the morning claiming 92 victims; this is billed the worst disaster in Paisley's history. The Gleniffer Braes, on the southern outskirts of Paisley, are home to a number of "decoy ponds" (mock airfields) used by the RAF after the Battle of Britain as part of a project code-named "Starfish Decoy" designed to confuse German spies.

==== Industrial decline ====
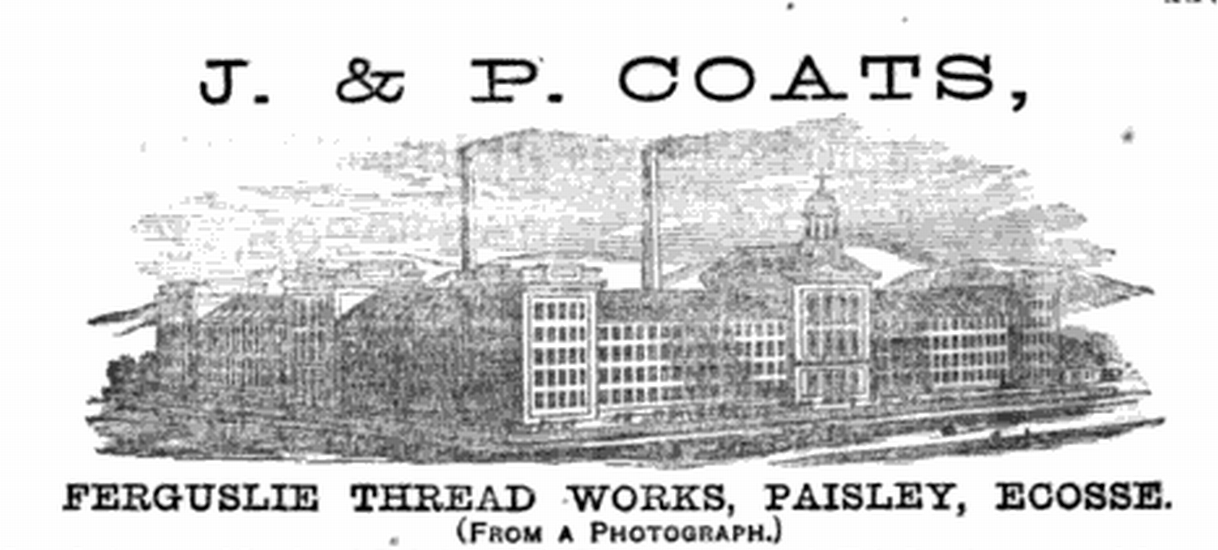
Advertisement for the Ferguslie Thread Works in the 1867 Paris World Fair catalogue

Paisley, as with other areas in Renfrewshire, was at one time famous for its weaving and textile industries. As a consequence, the Paisley pattern has long symbolic associations with the town. Until the Jacquard loom was introduced in the 1820s, weaving was a cottage industry. This innovation led to the industrialisation of the process and many larger mills were created in the town. Also as a consequence of greater mechanisation, many weavers lost their livelihoods and left for Canada and Australia. Paisley was for many years a centre for the manufacture of cotton sewing thread. At the heyday of Paisley thread manufacture in the 1930s, there were 28,000 people employed in the huge Anchor and Ferguslie mills of J & P Coats Ltd, said to be the largest of their kind in the world at that time. In the 1950s, the mills diversified into the production of synthetic threads but production diminished rapidly as a result of less expensive imports from overseas and the establishment of mills in India and Brazil by J & P Coats. By the end of the 1993, there was no thread being produced in Paisley.

The town also supported a number of engineering works some of which relied on the textile industry, others on shipbuilding. Paisley once had five shipyards including John Fullerton and Company (1866–1928), Bow, McLachlan and Company (1872–1932) and Fleming and Ferguson (1877–1969).

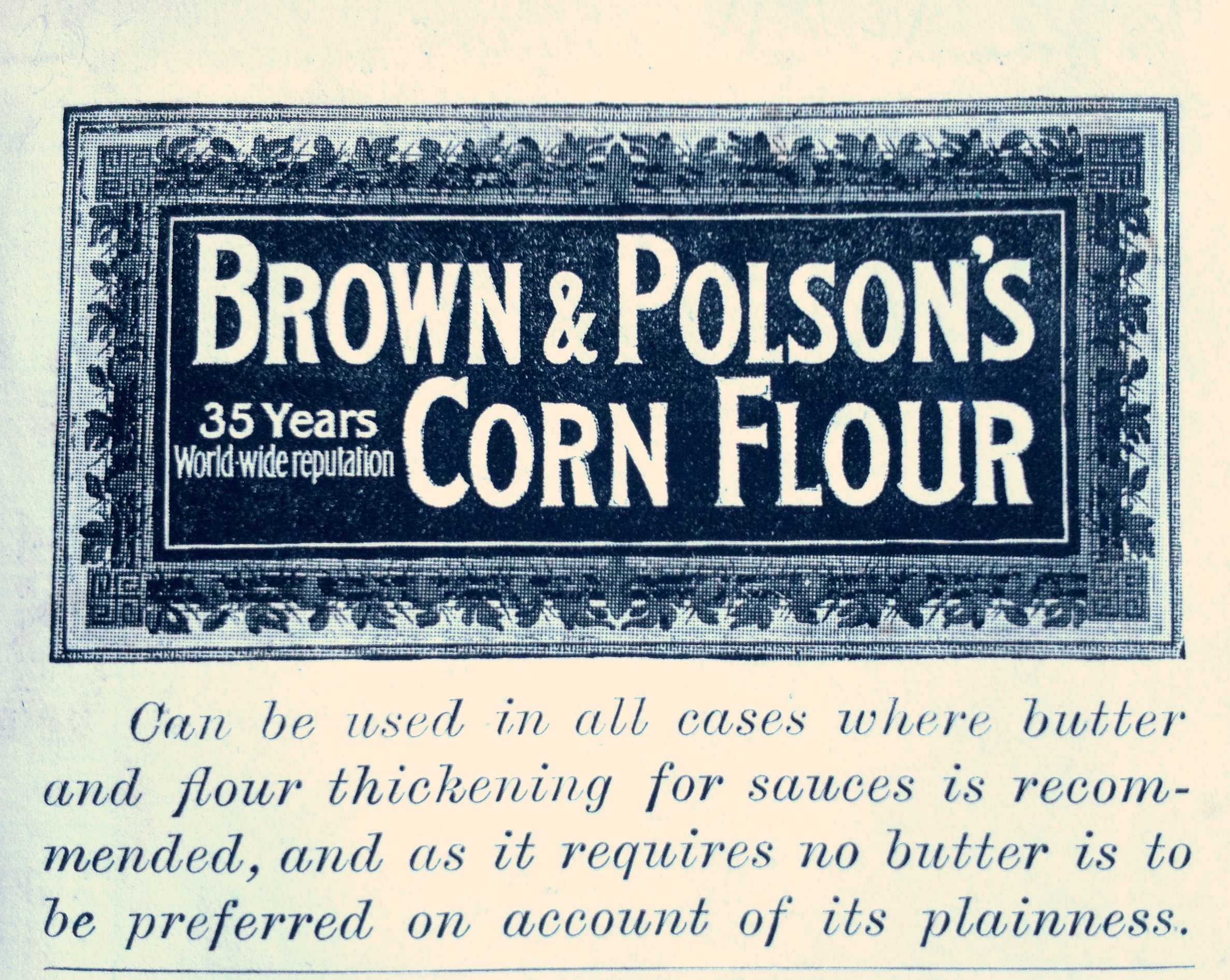
Advertisement for Brown & Polson's, 1894

A number of food manufacture companies existed in Paisley. The preserve manufacturer Robertsons began in Paisley as a grocer whose wife started making marmalade from oranges in 1860. This product was successful and a factory was opened in Storie Street, Paisley, to produce it in 1866 and additional factories were later opened in Manchester, London and Bristol. The company was taken over by Rank Hovis McDougall who closed its Stevenson Street factory and transferred production to England in the 1970s. Brown and Polson was formed in Paisley in 1840 and two years later started producing starch for the weaving trades, by 1860 it was making food products including its patent cornflour. It later became CPC Foods Ltd, a subsidiary of Unilever, which produced Hellmann's mayonnaise, Gerber baby foods and Knorr soups. The company ceased production in Paisley in 2002. The Piazza shopping centre was opened by Sean Connery in 1970 and has since been modernised several times.

In 1981 Peugeot Talbot, formerly Chrysler and before that Rootes, announced that its Linwood factory just outside Paisley would cease production. This led to the loss of almost 5,000 jobs. At one time M&Co. (Mackays) had its head office in Caledonia House in Paisley. Paisley had several cinemas in the town, all of which have since closed, including the Palladium (closed 1960s), the Regal, the La Scala Picture House (the B listed art deco 1912 facade of the cinema is now the entrance to the Paisley Centre) and the Kelburne.

=== 21st century ===
==== Regeneration ====
In 2015, the town launched its bid to become UK City of Culture in 2021. On 15 July 2017 Paisley was announced as one of five shortlisted candidates, On 7 December 2017 it lost to Coventry. Following the announcement, Renfrewshire Council and the Paisley 2021 Board stated that Paisley's "journey will continue" and that the bid process was "just the beginning" for regeneration processes in the town.

Funding acquired during the City of Culture bid has led to multi-million pound regenerations for many of the town's key attractions. This includes a £22million refurbishment to the Town Hall which reopened in October 2023, a new £7million Central Library and Learning Hub on the High Street which opened November 2023, and a £45million transformation of Paisley Museum due to be completed in late 2024. Renfrewshire Council also maintains its Townscape Heritage Initiative and Conservation Area Regeneration Scheme to provide grants to property owners in Paisley and the surrounding areas to carry out historic building repair and traditional shopfront reinstatement.

== Governance and public services ==
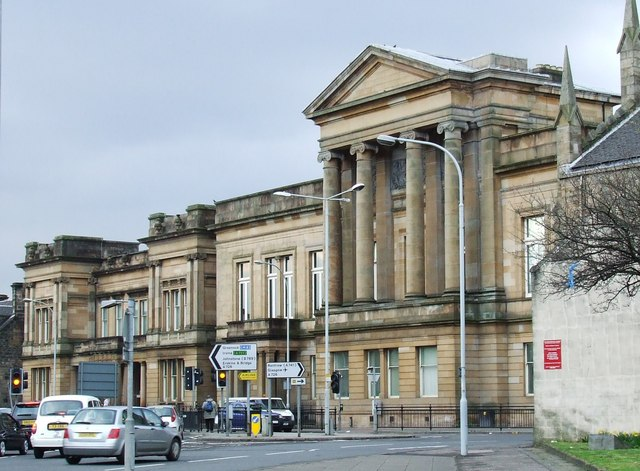
Paisley Sheriff Court and former County Buildings

Paisley is the administrative centre for the council area of Renfrewshire Council, and also lies within the registration county of the same name. The town is divided into Community Councils for representation at the most local level.

Paisley in represented in the Scottish Parliament by George Adam of the Scottish National Party (SNP), who holds the Paisley seat. For the House of Commons the town is divided between two constituencies covering the whole of Renfrewshire, both of which are held by MPs representing the Labour Party: Paisley and Renfrewshire North is represented by Alison Taylor and Paisley and Renfrewshire South is represented by Johanna Baxter.

Paisley lies within the Renfrewshire and Inverclyde Division of the Scottish police service and is one of three Area Commands in that division. Paisley is divided into five community policing areas: Paisley North-west (incorporating Glasgow Airport); Paisley South-west; Paisley East and Ralston; Paisley South; Gallowhill (as part of Renfrew and Gallowhill). Gallowhill is covered by the Renfrew Area Command. For judicial purposes, the area forms part of the sheriffdom of North Strathclyde and public prosecutions are directed by the Procurator Fiscal for Argyll and Clyde.

NHS Greater Glasgow and Clyde is the National Health Service Board serving Paisley and the town's main hospital with accident and emergency facilities is the Royal Alexandra Hospital. Strathclyde Fire and Rescue is the statutory fire and rescue service covering Paisley, with one community fire station on the town's Canal Street.

Water and sewerage is provided in Paisley by Scottish Water, a public body, and water and sewerage charges are collected alongside council tax by Renfrewshire Council, the local authority, on its behalf. Renfrewshire Council is also responsible for the provision of waste management in the area. Paisley's distribution network operator, the organisation licensed to transmit electricity from the National Grid to consumers, is Scottish Power.

== Geography ==
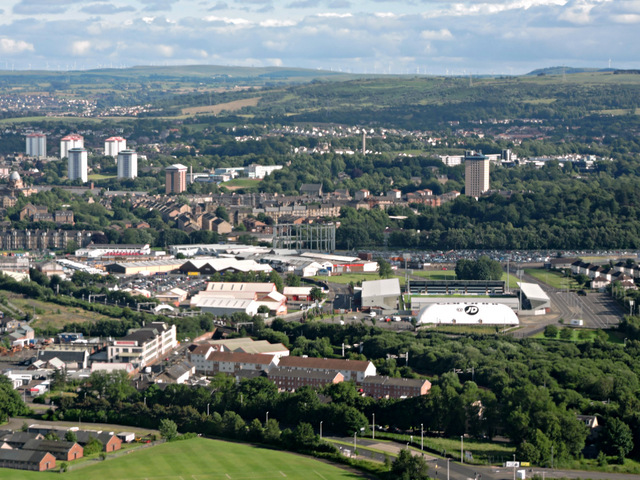
Ferguslie Park, a large residential area situated in Paisley

Paisley sits primarily on an expanse of low ground around 12 metres (40 ft) above sea level surrounding the White Cart Water, which runs through the town centre. There are some hills and ridges which have been absorbed as the town has expanded. The settlement is historically centred on Oakshaw, an area surrounding a hill to the north of the current High Street. Oakshaw is a conservation area, and on the high ground many of Paisley's significant buildings can be found, such as the High Kirk, the Coats Observatory and the former John Neilson Institution, which was once a school and is now converted into residential flats.

Paisley expanded steadily, particularly in the Victorian and Edwardian eras, creating many suburbs. Castlehead is a wooded conservation area primarily made up of Victorian villas where many of the town's leading industrialists made their homes in the late 19th century. Thornly Park is another conservation area, to the south of the town, just off Neilston Road toward Barrhead. It contains a variety of architecture ranging from mock Tudor to Art Deco. Many of the houses were designed by W. D. McLennan, a contemporary of Charles Rennie MacIntosh. McLennan also designed several local churches such as St Matthew's Church.

Particularly following the Housing Act 1946, modern Paisley grew into the surrounding countryside, and several large residential areas were created in the post-war period. These include portions of Glenburn (south), Foxbar (south west), Ferguslie Park (north west), Gallowhill (North East) and Hunterhill (South East). Gockston in the far north of the town has many terraced houses, and after regeneration has many detached and semi-detached houses as well as several blocks of flats. Dykebar, to the south east of the town centre, is a residential area which is also the site of Dykebar Hospital, a secure psychiatric hospital. Local parks include Fountain Gardens and Barshaw Park.

On the outskirts of the town are a number of settlements such as Ralston, a residential area in the far east bordering the city of Glasgow. Ralston was outside the Paisley burgh boundary when constructed in the 1930s, but as a result of local authority reorganisation in the 1990s, it is now a suburb of Paisley.

=== Climate ===
Climate data for Paisley (Note: Weather station is located 7 miles (11 km) from the Glasgow city centre.), elevation: 16 m (52 ft) 1991–2020 normals, extremes 1959–present
Month	Jan	Feb	Mar	Apr	May	Jun	Jul	Aug	Sep	Oct	Nov	Dec	Year
Record high °C (°F)	13.5 (56.3)	14.4 (57.9)	17.2 (63.0)	24.4 (75.9)	26.5 (79.7)	29.6 (85.3)	30.0 (86.0)	31.0 (87.8)	26.7 (80.1)	22.8 (73.0)	17.7 (63.9)	14.1 (57.4)	31.0 (87.8)
Mean daily maximum °C (°F)	7.2 (45.0)	7.8 (46.0)	9.8 (49.6)	13.0 (55.4)	16.1 (61.0)	18.4 (65.1)	19.8 (67.6)	19.3 (66.7)	16.7 (62.1)	13.0 (55.4)	9.6 (49.3)	7.4 (45.3)	13.2 (55.8)
Daily mean °C (°F)	4.6 (40.3)	5.0 (41.0)	6.5 (43.7)	9.0 (48.2)	11.8 (53.2)	14.3 (57.7)	15.9 (60.6)	15.6 (60.1)	13.3 (55.9)	9.9 (49.8)	6.9 (44.4)	4.7 (40.5)	9.8 (49.6)
Mean daily minimum °C (°F)	2.1 (35.8)	2.2 (36.0)	3.2 (37.8)	5.1 (41.2)	7.4 (45.3)	10.3 (50.5)	12.1 (53.8)	11.9 (53.4)	9.9 (49.8)	6.8 (44.2)	4.2 (39.6)	2.1 (35.8)	6.5 (43.7)
Record low °C (°F)	−14.8 (5.4)	−7.5 (18.5)	−8.3 (17.1)	−4.4 (24.1)	−1.1 (30.0)	1.5 (34.7)	3.9 (39.0)	2.2 (36.0)	−0.2 (31.6)	−3.5 (25.7)	−6.8 (19.8)	−14.5 (5.9)	−14.8 (5.4)
Average precipitation mm (inches)	146.4 (5.76)	115.2 (4.54)	97.4 (3.83)	66.1 (2.60)	68.8 (2.71)	67.8 (2.67)	82.9 (3.26)	94.8 (3.73)	98.4 (3.87)	131.8 (5.19)	131.8 (5.19)	161.4 (6.35)	1,262.8 (49.72)
Average precipitation days (≥ 1.0 mm)	17.7	14.7	13.8	12.3	12.1	12.1	13.3	13.9	13.9	16.2	17.3	16.9	174.3
Mean monthly sunshine hours	38.6	67.3	104.3	141.4	186.8	155.6	151.5	145.5	114.6	86.3	53.9	33.7	1,279.6
Source 1: Met Office
Source 2: Starlings Roost Weather

== Economy ==
Public sector organisations in Paisley include the headquarters of Renfrewshire Council, the largest campus of the University of the West of Scotland, the Paisley campus of West College Scotland and the Royal Alexandra Hospital.

Glasgow Airport, located on the northern edge of Paisley, is also a significant employer and part of the area's transport infrastructure. The airline Loganair's registered office is located within the airport complex.

Scotch whisky blenders and bottlers Chivas Brothers, now a subsidiary of Pernod Ricard, are also located in the town.

The site of the former Rootes/Chrysler/Talbot on the western outskirts of the town is now home to Phoenix Retail Park. Numerous private developers have invested, creating various retail outlets, vehicle showrooms, restaurants, a cinema complex, hotel and a business centre.

== Landmarks ==
=== Civic buildings ===
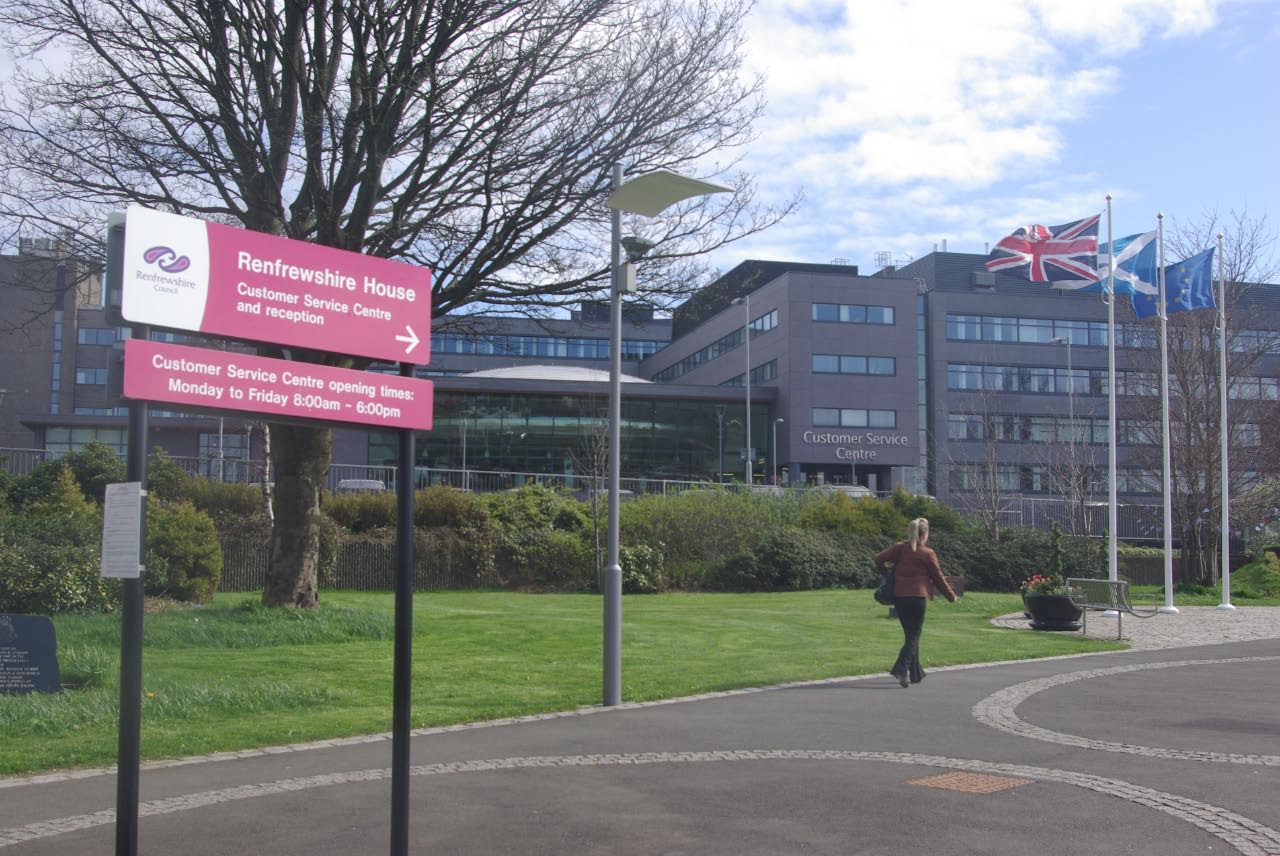
Renfrewshire House, headquarters of Renfrewshire Council

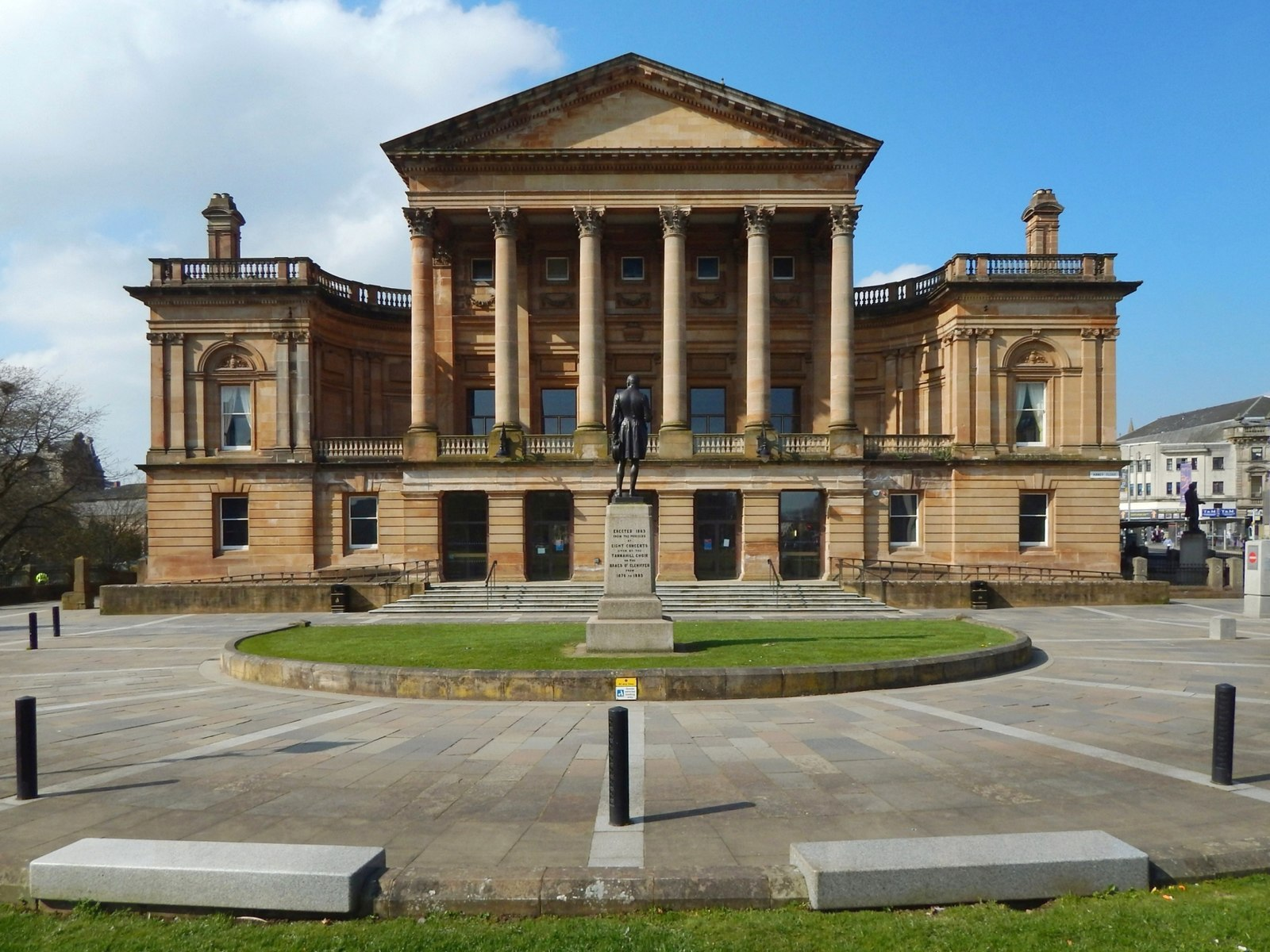
Paisley Town Hall, which has been converted into a centre for performing arts

As the administrative centre of the county of Renfrewshire, Renfrew District and, currently, Renfrewshire council area, Paisley is home to many significant civic buildings. Paisley Town Hall, adjacent to the Abbey, was funded by the will of George Aitken Clark, one of the Clark family, owners of the Anchor Mills. In competition, Sir Peter Coats funded the construction of the modern Paisley Museum and Central Library (1871), also in a neo-Classical style. The Clarks and Coats families dominated Paisley industry until their companies merged in 1896. Renfrewshire's former County Buildings, Police Station and Jail on County Square were demolished in 1821, and the County Council then met in a newer neo-classical building, completed in 1890, which now houses Paisley Sheriff Court.

Renfrewshire House, the modern headquarters of Renfrewshire Council, was constructed as Paisley Civic Centre. Designed by Hutchison, Locke and Monk following a competition, the building was designed to house offices of both the county and town councils. It was intended to become a civic hub for Paisley but the absence of any shops and non-council premises prevented this from happening. It became the home of the Renfrew sub-region of Strathclyde Regional Council in 1975 and of Renfrewshire Council in 1996. It is listed by the conservation organisation DoCoMoMo as one of the sixty key Scottish monuments of the post-war period.

Other civic buildings of interest include the Russell Institute, an art deco building constructed in 1926.

=== Religious sites ===
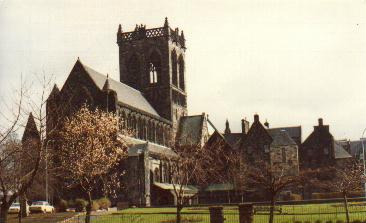
Paisley Abbey was the burial place of many Scottish kings of the House of Stewart during the 13th, 14th and 15th centuries

Most noticeable among the buildings of Paisley is its medieval Abbey in the centre of the town dating from the 12th century. The earliest surviving architecture is the south-east doorway in the nave from the cloister, which has a round arched doorway typical of Romanesque architecture which was the prevalent architectural style before the adoption of Gothic. The choir (east end) and tower date from the late 19th and early 20th centuries and are examples of Gothic Revival architecture. They were reconstructed in three main phases of restorations with the tower and choir conforming to the designs of Dr Peter MacGregor Chalmers. The roof in the nave is the most recent of restorations with the plaster ceiling by Rev Dr Boog which was added in the 1790s being replaced by a timber roof in 1981.

Former Thomas Coats Memorial Baptist Church, named for the industrialist Thomas Coats (1809–1883), is an example of Gothic Revival architecture. It dominates the town's skyline with its crown spire more than 60 m (197 ft) high. Opened in 1894 and designed by Hippolyte Jean Blanc it was the largest Baptist church in Europe. The exterior is made of old red sandstone. Inside, the church is decorated with wood carvings, mosaic floors and marble fonts. The church also contains a 3040 pipe Hill Organ.

The St Mirin's Cathedral in Incle Street is the seat of the Catholic Bishop of Paisley. The church was completed in 1931 to replace an earlier building, in nearby East Buchanan Street, which dated from 1808. The original St Mirin's church was the first Catholic church to be built in Scotland since the Reformation. With the erection of the Diocese of Paisley in 1947 the church was raised to cathedral status.

St Matthew's Church (Church of the Nazarene) at the junction of Gordon Street and Johnston Street is Art Nouveau in style. Designed by local architect William Daniel McLennan, a contemporary of Charles Rennie Mackintosh, it was built in 1905–07.

=== Other ===
Dating from circa 1160 Blackhall Manor is the oldest building in Paisley. It was given to the Burgh of Paisley by the Shaw-Stewart family in 1940, but was threatened with demolition in 1978. It was privately purchased in 1982 and fully restored as a private dwelling.

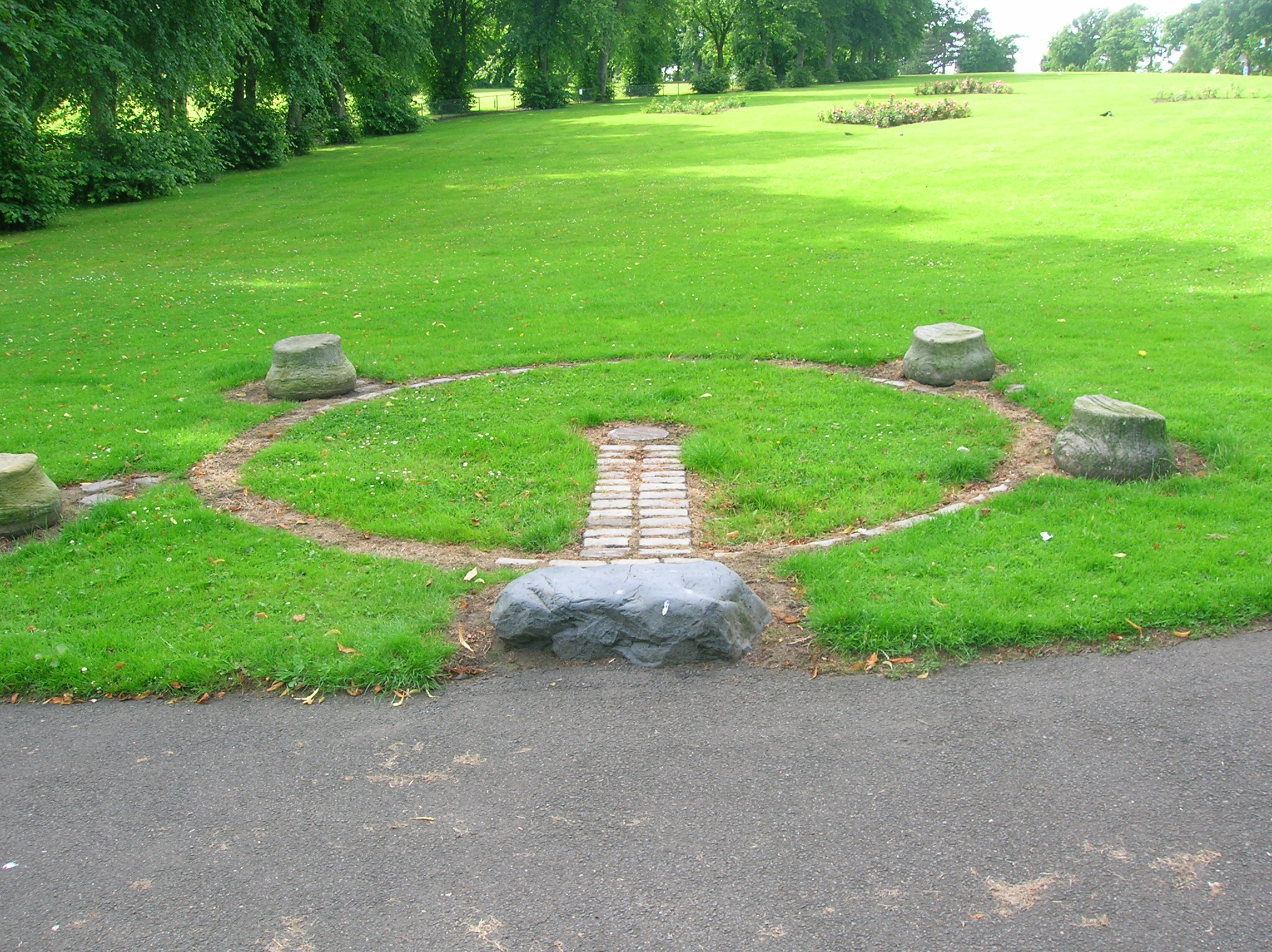
The Dooslan stane and the tolbooth bases in Brodie Park

As a result of its historic textile industry, Paisley has many examples of Victorian industrial architecture. Most notable is the Category A listed Anchor Mills, built in 1886. The building was converted in 2005 into residential flats. Textiles have a longer history in Paisley, represented by the Sma' Shot cottages complex on Shuttle Street: a small public museum of weaving from its 18th-century origins as a cottage industry.

Another landmark connected with the textile industry is the Dooslan Stane or Stone. The stone was a meeting place of the Weavers Union in the south of Paisley; it was also used as a "soapbox" and was originally inscribed with its history (now largely faded). It was moved from its original site at the corner of Neilston Road and Rowan Street to its present location in Brodie Park. Also present, arranged around the Dooslan Stane, are the four original Paisley Tolbooth stones. The Dooslan Stane is still used today as the congregating point for the annual Sma' Shot parade which takes place on the first Saturday in July.

The High Street drill hall was completed in about 1896.

The composer Thomas Wilson's 1988 work Passeleth Tapestry (later his Fourth Symphony) commemorates the history of Paisley in a single 30-minute movement. Commissioned by Renfrew District Council to mark Paisley's 500th anniversary as a burgh of barony, it was premiered on 6 August 1988 in Paisley Abbey with the Royal Scottish National Orchestra under Bryden Thomson. It was subsequently recorded by the Royal Scottish National Orchestra with conductor Rory Macdonald on the Linn Record Label, and received critical acclaim by the Gramophone, which considered its orchestration as "beguiling", but the string glissandos as "kitsch".

== Transport ==
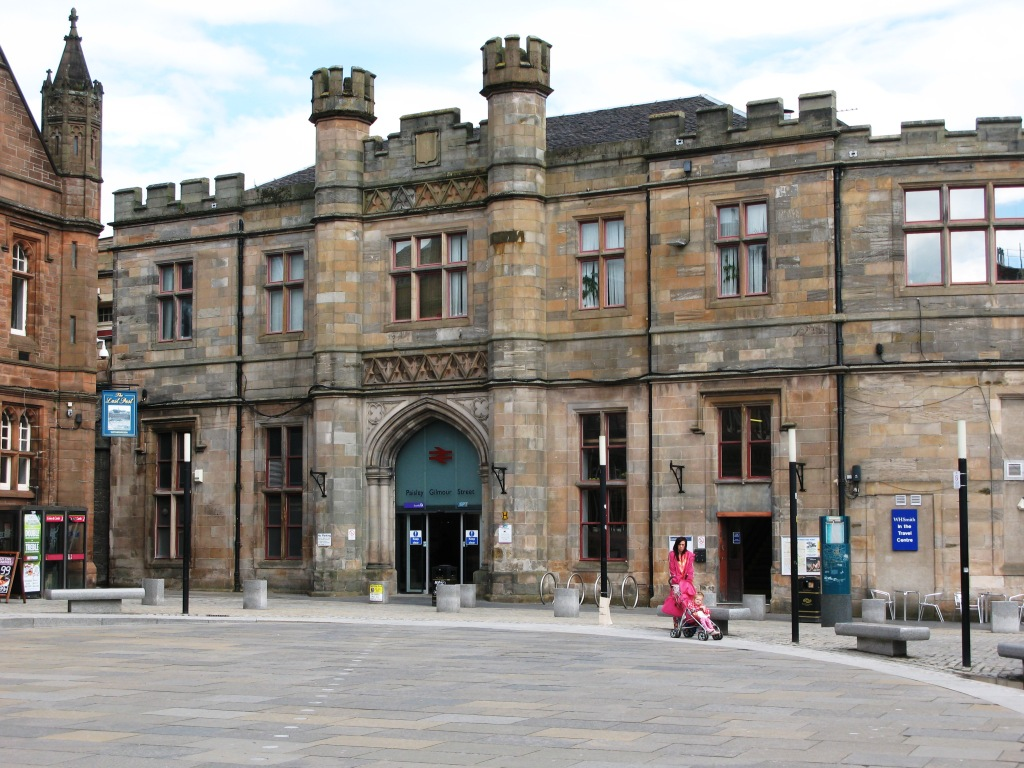
Paisley Gilmour Street railway station.

Paisley is connected to the motorway network and the National Rail network, and contains Glasgow Airport within its boundaries.

=== Road ===
Paisley is connected by road to the UK motorway network, with the M8 running along the northern edge of the town, Junctions 27, 28 and 29 providing access to Greenock to the west and Glasgow to the east. This forms part of the unsigned E05 Euroroute from Greenock to Gibraltar. Many major A roads converge through the town, including the A726, A737 and A761.

=== Public transport partnership ===
The Strathclyde Partnership for Transport, a public body, has direct operational responsibilities covering the area, such as supporting (and in some cases running) local bus services in Paisley (Graham's Bus Service) and across Strathclyde.

=== Railways ===
The town has four railway stations and is linked by rail to Glasgow city centre as well as Inverclyde and the Ayrshire coast. Paisley Gilmour Street is the largest of the stations and is also the fourth busiest train station in Scotland. There are also smaller stations at Paisley St James, Paisley Canal and Hawkhead. The rail links also connect to Glasgow Prestwick International Airport and ferry routes to Dunoon, the Isle of Arran, Isle of Bute and Northern Ireland. Over the years there have been thirteen railway stations in Paisley and three rail lines that are now closed (The Paisley and Barrhead District Railway, the Barrhead Branch of the GSWR, and the Paisley and Renfrew Railway). Paisley Canal station and the Paisley Canal Line owe their names to the Glasgow, Paisley and Johnstone Canal which occupied the route of the line until 1885, when it was filled in. The line reusues part of the Paisley Canal, which was the site of the Paisley canal disaster in 1810.

=== Air ===
Glasgow Airport, operated by AGS Airports, is Scotland's largest airport, located to the north of Paisley at Abbotsinch. It is adjacent to the M8 motorway and served by buses from Paisley Gilmour Street railway station. The planned Glasgow Airport Rail Link project, which was to run through Paisley, was abandoned in 2009. As mentioned above, Glasgow Prestwick Airport in Ayrshire is directly accessible by rail from Paisley Gilmour Street station.

== Education ==
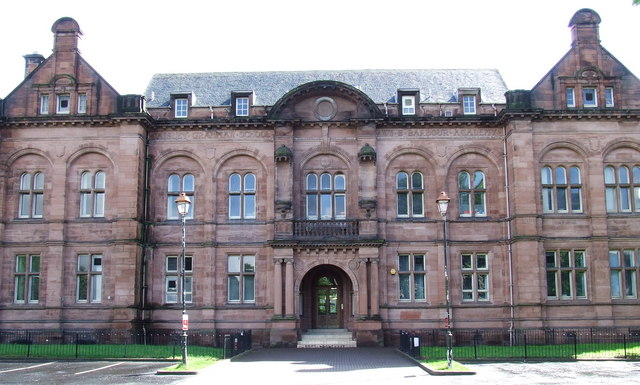
Paisley Grammar School, now a state comprehensive

Paisley is the main site for the modern University of the West of Scotland, which was created from a merger between the University of Paisley and Bell College in Hamilton, South Lanarkshire. The University of Paisley was granted university status in 1992, having existed previously as a central institution known as Paisley College of Technology. The further education college West College Scotland has a campus in the town; this institution was previously known as Reid Kerr College.

There are currently four comprehensive state secondary schools in Paisley: Paisley Grammar School, Castlehead High School, St Andrew's Academy, Paisley and Gleniffer High School. The oldest of these is Paisley Grammar which was founded in 1576 and was one of two former grammar schools in the town – alongside the former John Neilson Institution (latterly John Neilson High School) founded in 1852. Other former secondary schools in the area include Merksworth High School (to the north west of the town), St Mirin's Academy or High School (on the west side of the town), St Aelred's High School and Stanely Green High School (both on the south side of the town). Of the current secondary schools in the town, all are non-denominational save for St Andrew's Academy which is a Roman Catholic school.

== Culture ==
=== Religion ===
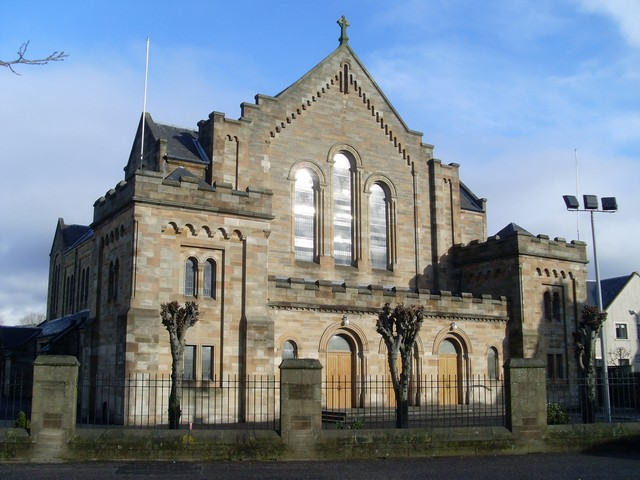
The Roman Catholic Cathedral of Saint Mirin

Religion	2011		2021	
Religion	Number	%	Number	%
Christian	43,359	56.4	33,747	42.5
–Church of Scotland	21,992	28.5	14,068	17.7
–Catholic	18,356	23.9	16,138	20.3
–Other Christian	3,011	3.9	3,541	4.5
Muslim	653	0.8	1,404	1.8
Jewish	37	<0.1	40	0.1
Hindu	133	0.2	295	0.4
Sikh	245	0.3	281	0.4
Buddhism	104	0.1	138	0.2
Pagan	—N/a	—N/a	262	0.3
Other religion	204	0.3	189	0.2
No religion	26,719	34.8	38,333	48.3
Religion not stated	5,378	7.0	4,674	5.9
Total	76,834	100.00%	79,369	100.00%

Paisley is home to a number of religious denominations and is an important historical centre for the Christian faith in Scotland. The town's historic patron saint is Saint Mirin (or Mirren); according to legendary accounts, Mirin settled in Paisley as a missionary sent from Ireland in the 6th century and was instrumental in bringing the relics of St Andrew to Scotland. Paisley Abbey, one of the town's most significant landmarks, was constructed as a priory in the 12th century and raised to abbey status in the 13th. It served as an ecclesiastical centre for a wide area surrounding the county of Renfrewshire for centuries until the Reformation when such religious centres were reduced to the status of parish churches. For the Church of Scotland, Paisley forms part of the Presbytery of Clyde. (see: Church of Scotland synods and presbyteries).

Other Christian communities have a number of churches in Paisley, many of which were the result of the Industrial Revolution where people from around the British Isles came to Paisley for work. The Roman Catholic Diocese of Paisley, created in 1947, is centred upon the town's St Mirin's Cathedral, the seat of the Bishop of Paisley. Paisley also forms part of the Episcopalian (Anglican) Diocese of Glasgow and Galloway with its main facilities being contained at the Holy Trinity and St Barnabas Church in the town centre, a congregation which united in 2004. There are currently two Baptist congregations in Paisley: in addition to Thomas Coats Memorial Baptist Church (see under "Landmarks – religious sites") is Central Baptist Church, which meets in nearby Lady Lane. Paisley is home to a meetinghouse of the Church of Jesus Christ of Latter-day Saints located on Glenburn Road.

Other smaller religious groups exist in the town. The Methodist Church of Great Britain has a church and central hall opposite Paisley Abbey which forms part of the Ayrshire and Renfrewshire Circuit. The Christadelphians meet in a hall on Alice Street.

=== Media ===
Paisley has one local daily newspaper, the Paisley Daily Express, which is owned by the Trinity Mirror Group. Various local radio stations have operated at times, including Q96 from 1992 to 2007 – serving the Renfrewshire area, although for a considerable period based in neighbouring Glasgow. Its replacement, Glasgow-based Guardian Media Group station 96.3 Rock Radio carries Renfrewshire focused material. In October 2011 Rock Radio, faced with falling advertising revenue, was rebranded by Guardian Media Group as Real Radio XS after a proposed management buyout failed to materialise.

Paisley has two local radio stations. Paisleyradio.com broadcasts from the centre of Paisley with a large online audience. Paisley FM broadcasts from the Grammar School, it covers Paisley, Renfrew and Johnstone.

=== Sport ===
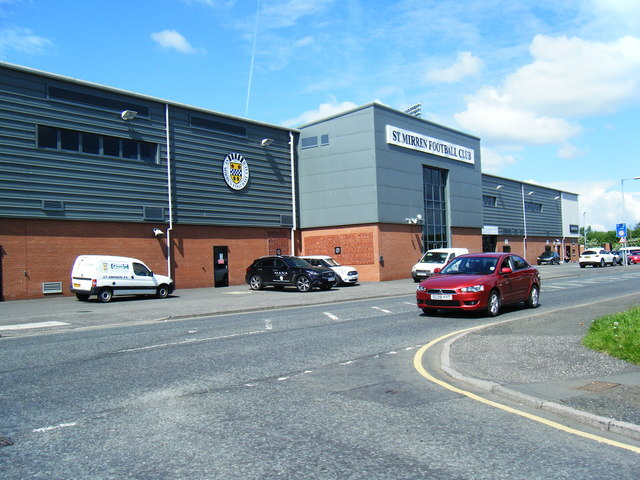
St Mirren Park, home stadium of St Mirren F.C.

St Mirren F.C. is Paisley's sole professional association football team. As of 2018, it plays in the Scottish Premiership. In 2009, the team moved from their Love Street stadium to a new 8,029 capacity stadium, known formally as St Mirren Park, on Greenhill Road. The stadium was later renamed as The Paisley 2021 Stadium to mark the town's bid to be UK City of Culture in 2021. St Mirren last won the Scottish Cup on 16 May 1987. The club won the Scottish League Cup for the first time in its history on 17 March 2013, a feat they repeated on 14 December 2025. Another professional football team, Abercorn F.C., was based in Paisley until its decline and liquidation in 1920.

St Mirren Basketball Club was formed in 1997: they have won the National League title once, in 2000, and have won the Scottish Cup three times (1999, 2002 and 2012).

Paisley RFC is an amateur rugby union club based at the Anchor Recreation Grounds in Paisley.

Kelburne Hockey Club is a local club which was founded in 1969.

=== Notable people ===
Historically, Paisley was notable as the religious home of the Stewart family who descended from Walter FitzAlan, the first High Steward of Scotland and founder of Paisley Abbey, eventually becoming the Scottish and British Royal Family. The Stewarts once resided at a castle in nearby Renfrew. All six of the High Stewards are buried in the Abbey, as is Marjorie Bruce – the eldest daughter of Robert I of Scotland (Robert the Bruce) – who married the 6th High Steward, thus founding the Stewart dynasty. The first Stewart King of Scotland and son of Marjorie Bruce and Walter Stewart, Robert II, is believed to have been born in the Abbey. His son Robert III is buried there.

Ronald Reagan's maternal great-great-grandparents, Claude Wilson and Margaret Downey, were married at Paisley High Church on 23 May 1807.

Other notable people associated with Paisley include:

==== Arts and media ====
- John Amabile (interior designer)
- Claire Barclay (artist)
- Seán Batty (STV weatherman)
- John Bell (actor)
- Gerard Butler (actor and producer)
- John Byrne (artist and playwright)
- Tom Conti (actor)
- Kari Corbett (actress)
- Nick Currie (singer/songwriter, journalist)
- Whisky David (1947–2011) (musician and singer/songwriter)
- Jim Dewar (musician and singer/songwriter)
- Joe Egan (musician and songwriter)
- Anya Gallaccio (artist)
- Alexander Gardner (photographer)
- Alexander Goudie (artist)
- Fergus Hall (painter, illustrator, educator)
- William Hart (artist)
- Thomas Kibble Hervey (poet and critic)
- John Hutchison, (architect)
- Thomas S. Tait (architect)
- Kenny Ireland (director and actor)
- Vince Jones (Australian jazz singer, songwriter, and trumpet, flugelhorn and flumpet player)
- Graeme Kelling (1957–2004) (musician from pop group Deacon Blue)
- Patricia Leitch (children's author)
- Phyllis Logan (actor)
- Paul McGillion (actor)
- Neve McIntosh (actress)
- Fulton Mackay (actor)
- Kenneth McKellar (tenor)
- James McMillan (author and historian)
- Ron McMillan (photojournalist and novelist)
- Denzil Meyrick (writer/businessman)
- Kelly Marie (singer)
- Steven Moffat (screenwriter)
- Brendan Mullen (author/nightclub owner)
- Andrew Neil (journalist and television presenter)
- Hector Nicol (singer, comedian and actor)
- Paolo Nutini (singer/songwriter)
- Alan Orr (actor/musician)
- Ebenezer Picken (poet and songwriter)
- Gerry Rafferty (musician and singer/songwriter)
- John Reid (impresario)
- Albert Rossi (musician/drummer)
- David Sneddon (singer/songwriter)
- Alexander Stoddart, Her Majesty's Sculptor in Ordinary in Scotland
- Robert Tannahill (1774–1810) (poet)
- Paul Telfer (actor)
- David Tennant (actor)
- Tom Urie (actor/musician)
- Alexander Wilson (poet, ornithologist)
- Mark Rowley (actor)

==== Business ====
- David Eccles (businessman)
- John Glassford (tobacco lord)
- Fred Goodwin, (banker)
- Tirath Khemlani, (banker)
- Andrew Millar (18th-century bookseller)
- Nora Senior (businesswoman)
- Trevor Sorbie (hairdresser)

==== Politics and religion ====
- George Adam (politician, current MSP for Paisley)
- Douglas Alexander (politician, ex Member of Parliament for Paisley and Renfrewshire South)
- Wendy Alexander (politician)
- H. H. Asquith (MP from 1920–4)
- John Barr, (member of the New Zealand Legislative Council)
- Mhairi Black (politician, MP for Paisley and Renfrewshire South)
- Sir William Dunn, 1st Baronet, of Lakenheath (politician)
- Willie Gallacher (politician)
- Patrick Gilday (United Mine Workers official, USA)
- Ian Hamilton (lawyer and nationalist)
- Hugh Henry (politician)
- Patrick Hutchison (Presbyterian minister)
- Eleanor Laing (politician)
- James MacGregor (Free Church minister there, 1861-1868)
- George Murdoch (politician, first mayor of Calgary, Canada)
- Sandra Osborne (politician, ex MP for Ayr, Carrick and Cumnock)
- Robert II of Scotland (king)
- Andrew Sinclair (surgeon, botanist, public servant, and politician in New Zealand)
- Liz Truss (politician, Prime Minister (2022))

==== Science and education ====
- Agnes Barr Auchencloss (medical officer)
- Archibald Barr (scientific engineer)
- Robert Broom (palaeontologist)
- Iain Boyd (aerospace engineer)
- Ronald Ian Currie (oceanographer)
- James Goodfellow (Inventor; ATM and PIN)
- Jimmy Kinnon (founder of Narcotics Anonymous)
- David Stow (educationalist)
- Alan C Surgenor (Merchant Navy Marine Engineer)
- James Finlay Weir Johnston (scientist and educationalist)

==== Sport ====
- Robert Archibald (basketball player)
- Archie Scott Brown (racing driver)
- Jack Carlin (cyclist)
- Owen Coyle (footballer)
- Gordon Durie (footballer)
- Tom Forsyth (footballer)
- Paul Gallacher (footballer)
- Archie Gemmill (footballer)
- James Grady (footballer)
- Dale Greig (holder of the women's world record for the marathon in 1964)
- Majid Haq (Scottish international cricketer, all time leading Scottish wicket taker as of 2015)
- Omer Hussain (cricketer)
- Hamza Tahir (cricketer)
- Callum Hawkins (athlete)
- David Hay (footballer)
- Paul Lambert (footballer)
- Barry Lavety (footballer)
- Jamie Langfield (footballer)
- Hugh Lorimer (footballer)
- Marc McAusland (footballer)
- Derek McInnes (footballer)
- Micky Mellon (footballer and Oldham Athletic manager)
- Charlie Mitchell (footballer)
- Campbell Money (footballer)
- Robbie Neilson (footballer)
- Brian O'Neil (footballer)
- Lee Peacock (footballer)
- Mark Ralph (Scottish international hockey player)
- Kay Lee Ray (professional wrestler)
- Bernie Slaven (footballer)
- Brian Smith (Olympic cyclist)
- Alasdair Strokosch (Scottish international rugby player)
- Angela Taylor (Great Britain international ice hockey player)
- Elaine Vassie (rugby coach)

==== Military ====
- John James Snodgrass (Battle of Waterloo)
- Samuel Evans recipient of the Victoria Cross (Crimean war hero)
- John Hannah recipient of the Victoria Cross (RAF sergeant)
- Arthur HendersonC recipient of the Victoria Cross (army captain)
- Hugh McIver recipient of the Victoria Cross (Army private)
- James McKechnie recipient of the Victoria Cross (army sergeant)
- Archie McKellar (Battle of Britain ace)

== Twin towns and cities ==
Paisley is twinned with:

- Fürth, Germany, since 1969
- Gladsaxe, Denmark, since 1990
