= Gallowhill =

Human Settlement in Glasgow, Scotland

Coordinates: 55°51′22″N 4°24′33″W

Gallowhill is a housing estate in the north east of Paisley, a town in Renfrewshire, Scotland. Its approximate boundaries are formed by the M8 motorway to the north, the A741 Renfrew Rd to the west, to the south the Inverclyde railway line with Arkleston Farm making up the estate's eastern border. The most common types of housing are cottage flats and two storey tenements, although there are some three storey units and terraced housing in addition to two tower blocks (Gallowhill Court and Glencairn Court).

== Education ==
There are two primary schools in the area: St Catherine's Primary School and Gallowhill Primary School.

The estate falls within the catchment areas of four secondary schools: Castlehead High, Paisley Grammar School, St Andrew's Academy in Paisley and Trinity High School in Renfrew.

== History ==
Before the current housing estate was built, there was a large neo-Gothic mansion called Gallowhill House on the land where Priory Avenue stands today. The first phase of modern building around Netherhill Rd and Gallowhill Rd was completed in the 1930s. The second phase around Dundonald Rd, Glencairn Rd and Montgomery Rd was constructed in the late 1940s and early 1950s, the third phase of tower blocks in the mid-1960s with the fourth and final phase around Knock Way and Kilwynet Way being completed in the early 1970s. The second phase has seen a depletion of its housing stock with the demolition of the tenement blocks in Dundonald Rd. Otherwise the housing stock remains much as it was at the time of construction.

== Famous people ==
Notable former residents of Gallowhill include the actor Gerard Butler, painter Francis Convery, music manager John Reid, folk singer and music manager Danny Kyle, footballer James Grady, actor and musician Tom Urie, and musician Jim Dewar.
