= Paisley Barracks =

- Paisley, Renfrewshire
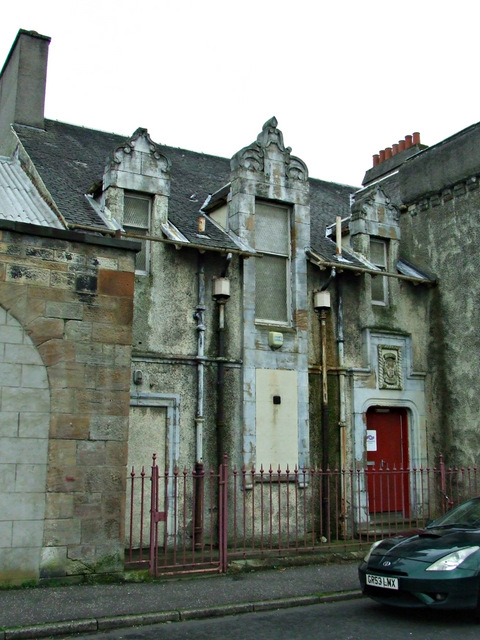
- A building on the eastern boundary of the site currently used by Renfrewshire Council to store museum exhibits

Site information
- Type: Barracks
- Owner: War Office
- Operator: British Army

Location
- Location within Renfrewshire
- Coordinates: 55.8477°N 4.4068°W

Site history
- Built: 1822
- Built for: War Office
- In use: 1822-c.1880

Paisley Barracks was a military installation in Paisley, Renfrewshire.

== History ==
The infantry barracks, which were built on the south side of the Glasgow Road in the Williamsburgh district of Paisley as part of the response to the Radical War, were completed in 1822. The Earl of Glasgow used the infantry barracks to raise a regiment of yeomanry and a volunteer rifle corps. Units subsequently based at the infantry barracks in the 1820s included the 10th Hussars and the 13th Regiment of Foot. As part of the Cardwell Reforms of the 1870s, where single-battalion regiments were linked together to share a single depot and recruiting district in the United Kingdom, the 26th (Cameronian) Regiment of Foot was linked with the 74th (Highland) Regiment, and both were temporarily based at the barracks. These regiments moved out to Hamilton Barracks in Hamilton a few years later and the infantry barracks were disused and empty by 1882.

The militia barracks, which were built on the north side of the Glasgow Road in the Whitehaugh district of Paisley, were also completed in the 1820s. The 4th (Extra Reserve) Battalion, the 1/6th (Renfrewshire) Battalion and the 2/6th (Renfrewshire) Battalion of the Argyll and Sutherland Highlanders were all raised at the barracks at the start of the First World War. Part of the site formerly occupied by the militia barracks was redeveloped for the Kelburne Cinema in 1933. A building on the eastern boundary of the site, which still displays the "Ubique" crest of the Royal Engineers above the lintel, is currently used by Renfrewshire Council to store museum exhibits.

== Sources ==
- Johnston, S. H. F. (1957). The history of the Cameronians (Scottish Rifles) : 26th and 90th : vol. I, 1689–1910. Aldershot: Gale & Polden.
