= Nora Senior =

Nora Margaret Senior CBE DL
- Occupation: Businesswoman
- Known for: British Chambers of Commerce, Weber Shandwick

Nora Margaret Senior CBE DL is a Scottish businesswoman. She has received awards including the First Women UK Media Award (2013), and the global ‘Stevie’ for Best Woman in Business (in Europe, Middle East and Asia), In 2013 she was appointed president of the British Chambers of Commerce. She is also a regional chair at Weber Shandwick.

== Career ==
Nora Senior started working at Saatchi and Saatchi's consultancy in Scotland. In 1988, she became the company's managing director. In 1990 she formed a start-up called PR Centre, eventually merging the company into Weber Shandwick in 1998. In 2009, Senior became Weber Shandwick's executive chair of UK regions and Ireland.

In 2013, Senior became President of the British Chambers of Commerce. In the same year, she became president of the Scottish Chambers of Commerce. In 2013, Senior was awarded Businesswoman of the Year, as well as being appointed a Commander of the Order of the British Empire (CBE) in the 2017 Birthday Honours for services to British and Scottish businesses.

Senior joined the council of the University of Nottingham in 2016. As of March 2020, she is vice chair of the council. She stepped down from Council in January 2025.

She is also, again as of March 2020, a board Member of the International Chambers of Commerce, a Regional Adviser to London Stock Exchange, and the non-executive chair of the Scottish Government's Strategic Board. In March 2023, he was appointed a Deputy lieutenant of Nottinghamshire.

== Awards ==
- Global Women in Business Award (2007)
- Global Award for Best Communications Executive (2008)
- UK Outstanding Business Achieve (2010)
- First Woman of Media UK Award (2013)
- MBA Award Lifetime Achievement for Contribution to Business (2015)
- CIPR Outstanding Consultancy of the Year (2017)
- Awarded Commander of the Order of the British Empire for Services to British Business (2017)
