= Whisky David =

Scottish-born Spain-based blues rock musician

Whisky David (1944 – 2011), born David Waterston in Paisley, Scotland, was a Scottish-born, Spain-based blues rock musician. He released one album, Rusty Rock (1975) and a number of singles.

Waterston came to Spain in 1966 on a tour bus with English group the Sabres and decided to stay. While living in Madrid, he joined a Spanish group called the Shakers and then went on to join the Spanish rock outfit Los Brincos. Fernando Arbex, drummer of Los Brincos, produced Rusty Rock.

From the album, Rusty Rock, the single "Charlie", about a late-lamented pet dog, became a hit in Brazil.
