= Barshaw Park =

Public park in Paisley, Scotland

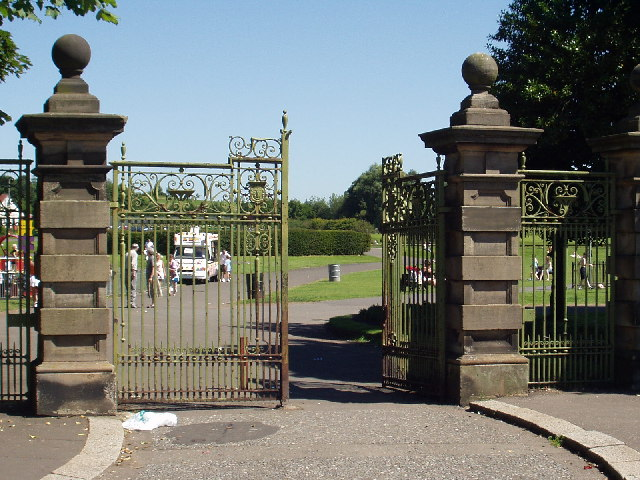
- Southwest entrance (2005)
- Interactive map of Barshaw Park
- Location: Paisley
- Nearest city: Glasgow
- Coordinates: 55.848°N 4.395°W
- Area: 55 acres (22 ha)
- Operator: Renfrewshire Council
- Open: 15 June 1912
- Status: Open

Barshaw Park is public park in Paisley, Scotland. It has 55 acres (22 hectares) of recreational parkland and garden areas which are open to the public.

== History ==
In the early 20th century, the local council of Paisley was looking to create a public recreation area. A wealthy local family, the Arthurs, sold 55 acres (22 hectares) of land to Paisley Burgh Council (now Renfrewshire Council) in 1911. Ground works were carried out at the site and the park opened on 15 June 1912.

Barshaw House was included with the sale of the land. It is a mansion situated within the park and was the home of the Arthurs. The building over the years has been a private house, military hospital, care home and now luxury flats.

== Amenities ==
The park offers various amenities and activities for the general public. These include a boating pond, walled garden, bmx track, miniature railway, swing park and a municipal golf course.

A small zoo was located within the park, with its final animals (a pair of donkeys) being rehomed in 2020. The zoo had kept animals such as pigs, peacocks and a rhea.

Special events like funfair day and open gala days are hosted at the park.

== Gallery ==
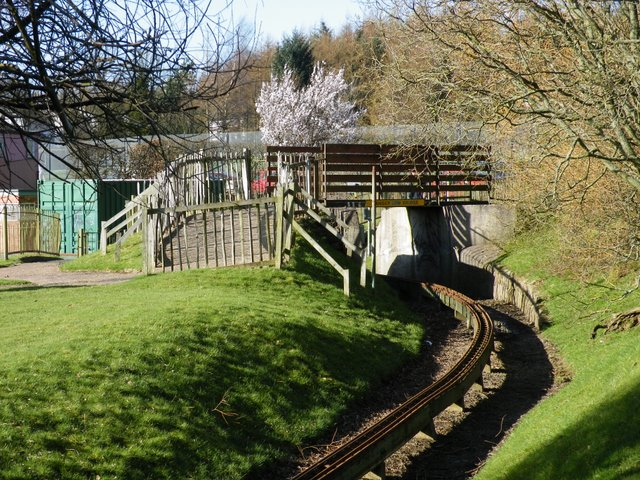
Miniature Railway

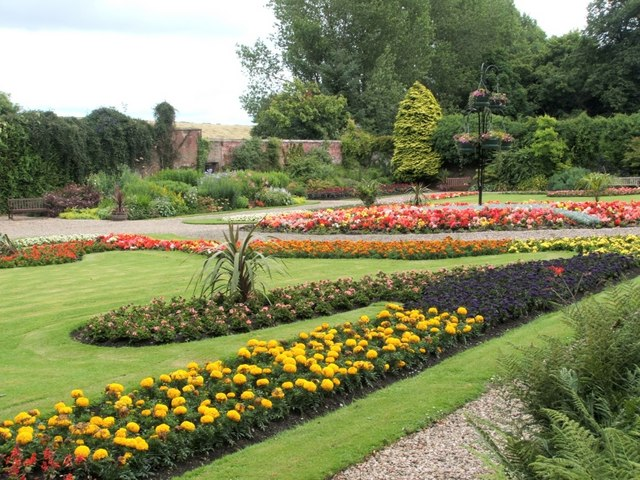
Peace Garden

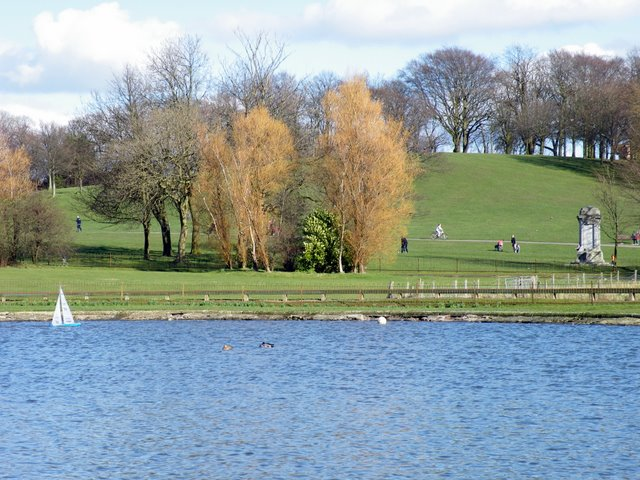
Boating Pond

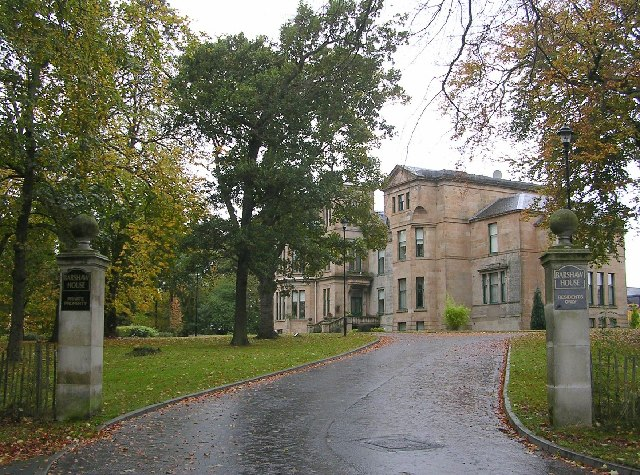
Barshaw House
