= Thomas Coats =

Scottish thread manufacturer (1809–1883)

Thomas Coats (1809–1883) was a Scottish thread manufacturer and philanthropist.

== Life ==
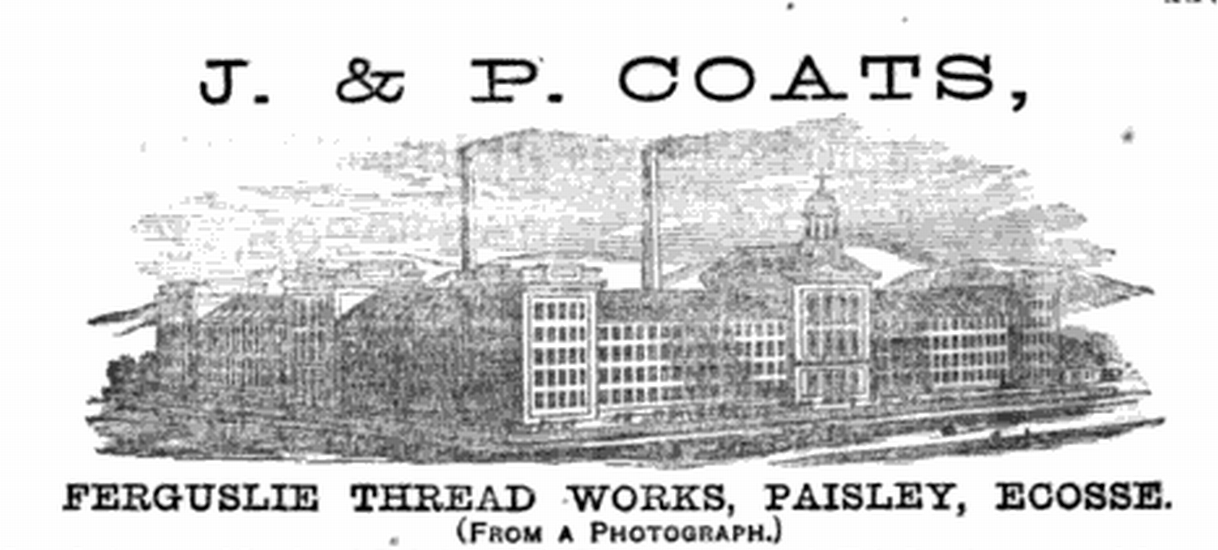
Ferguslie Thread Works, advertisement in the catalogue of the Paris World Fair 1867.

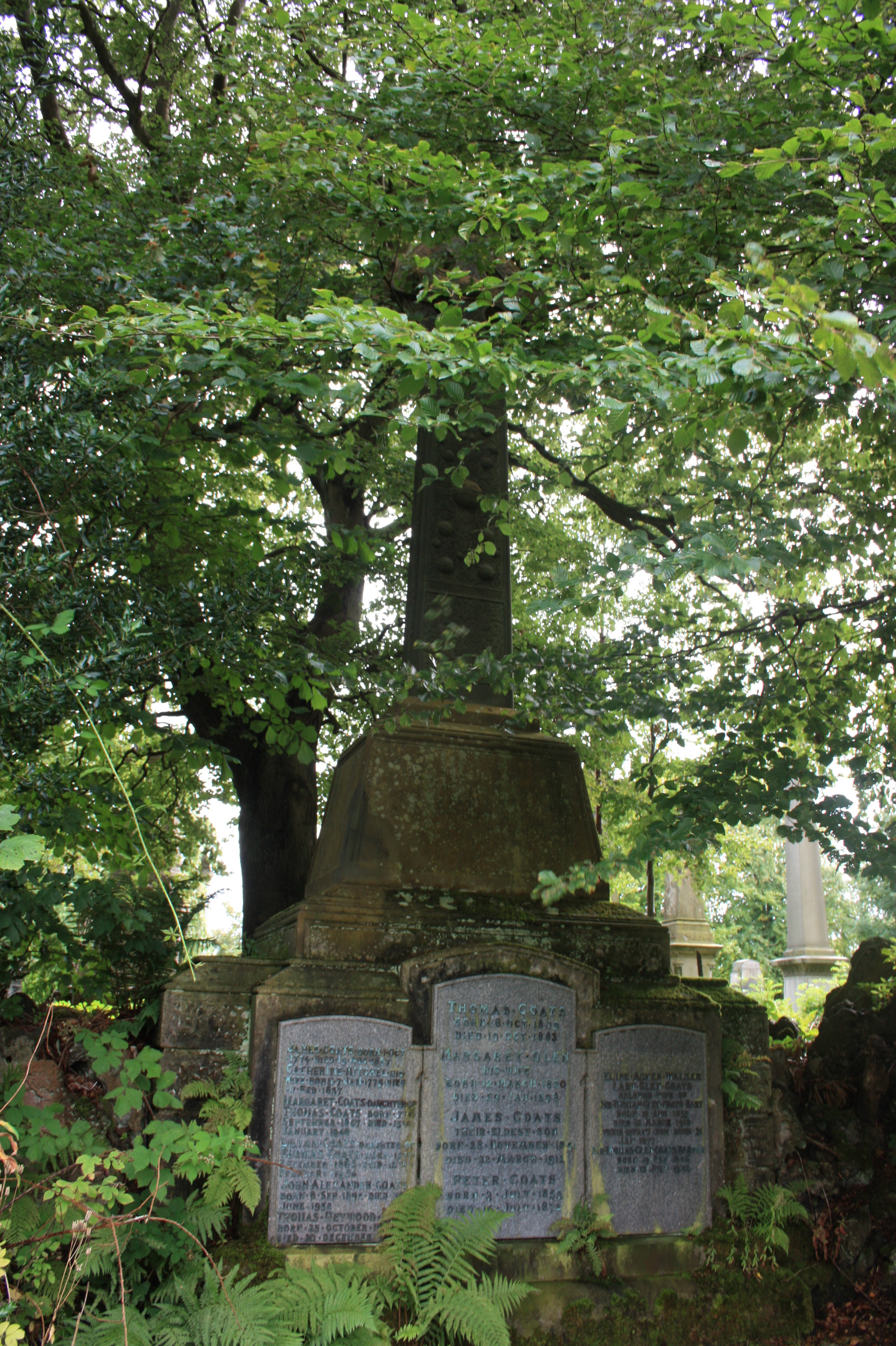
The grave of Thomas Coats, Woodside Cemetery, Paisley

Coats was born at Paisley 18 October 1809. He was the fourth of a family of ten sons. His father, James Coats, was one of the founders of the Coats Group of Paisley. In the hands of Thomas and his surviving brother, Sir Peter Coats, the Ferguslie Thread Works became substantial.

Coats in 1868 presented to the town of Paisley a public park, called the 'Fountains Gardens,' as a place of recreation. He took an interest in education, and in 1873 was elected chairman of the school board, an office he continued to hold until his death. He gave large sums to improve the school accommodation, and provided a playground. From 1862 to 1864 he was president of the Paisley Philosophical Institution, and in 1882 he presented to the society the Coats Observatory; he furnished it with an equatorial telescope and other instruments, and provided a residence and endowment for the curator.

Coats was a collector of Scottish coins, and his collection became the largest and most valuable of its kind. He wanted a catalogue of the specimens, and entrusted the work to Edward Burns, a Scottish numismatist. But in Burns's hands the catalogue swelled into an elaborate Coinage of Scotland (1887). It was unfinished at the time of Coats's death. Burns himself died suddenly, and the task of completion was entrusted to George Sim.

In November 1881 Coats and his brother Sir Peter were entertained at a banquet at Paisley, and presented with their portraits, painted by Sir Daniel Macnee, P.R.S.A.

Coats died of an affliction of the heart on 15 October 1883. He is buried in Woodside Cemetery in the West End of Paisley. The grave stands at the summit immediately west of the statue to James Fillans and paired with the grave of Peter Coats, east of the statue.

== Memorials ==
A statue was erected at Paisley to his memory. In religion Coats was a Baptist, and in politics a Liberal. The Thomas Coats Memorial Baptist Church in Paisley is named in his honour.

== Family ==
He was married to Margaret Glen (1820-1898). He and his wife brought up his 11 children in Ferguslie House in 1845.

His daughter Janet Coats, set up one of the first literary prizes in Scotland, the James Tait Black Memorial Prize, in memory of her late husband.

Other children included James Coats (1841-1912), Peter Coats (1855-1872), and Thomas Glen Coats (1846-1922).
