= Fountain Gardens, Paisley =

Park in Paisley, Renfrewshire, Scotland

Fountain Gardens
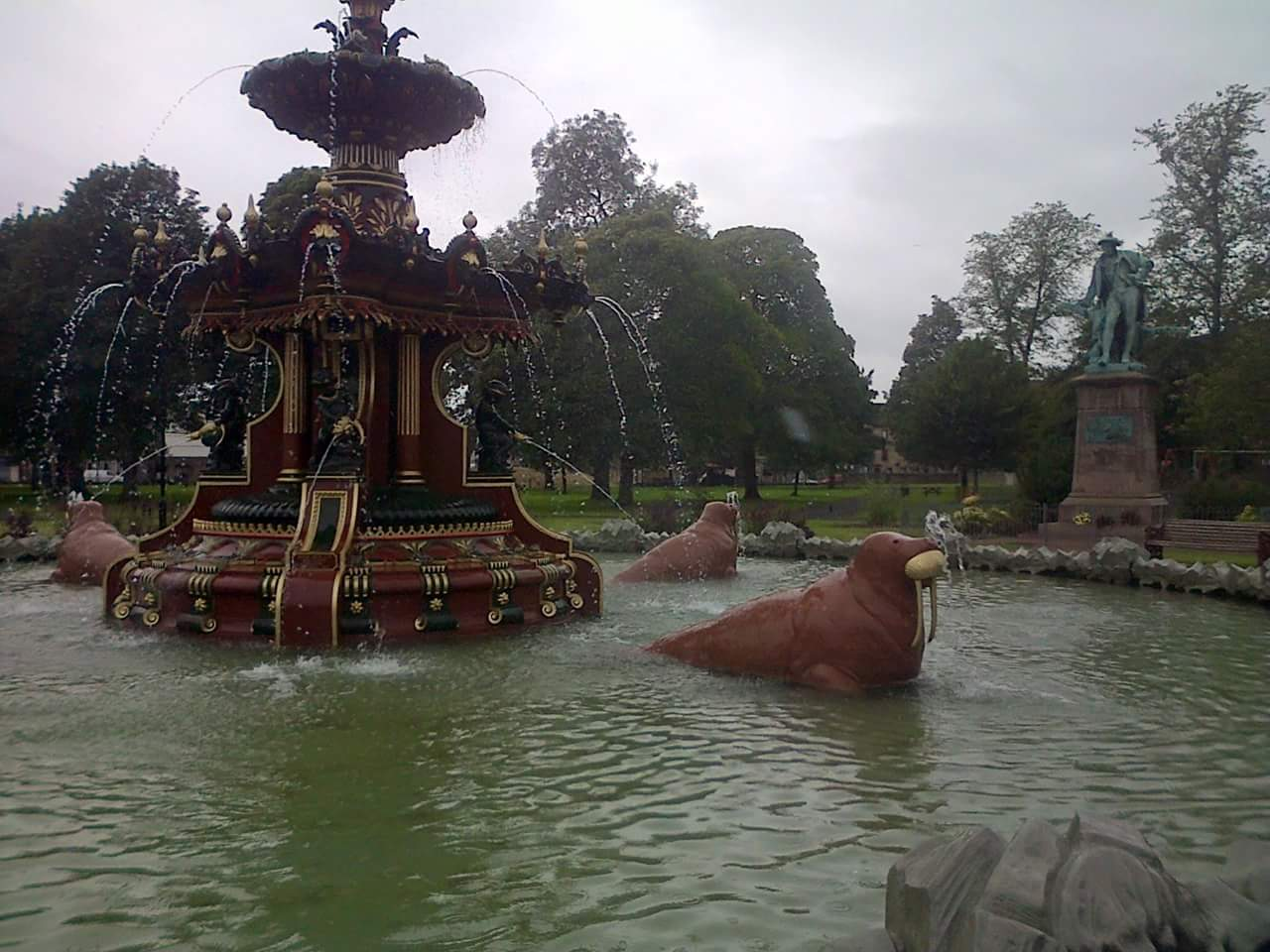
- Grand Central Fountain
- Interactive map of Fountain Gardens
- Location: Paisley
- Nearest city: Glasgow
- Coordinates: 55°51′01″N 4°25′42″W
- Operator: Renfrewshire Council
- Open: 26 May 1868
- Status: Open

Fountain Gardens is in Paisley, Scotland. It has recreational parkland and garden areas which are open to the public. The park is Paisley's oldest public gardens. Within the park is Grand Central Fountain, one of only three Category A listed fountains in Scotland.

== History ==
Fountain Gardens was originally laid out on grounds called Hope Temple Gardens, which were created by prominent business man John Love in 1797. The Hope Temple Museum and a bowling green were sited within the original park. Love became bankrupt after a disastrous American business venture and the park grounds were sold to the famous industrialist Thomas Coats in 1866. He enlisted the help of James Craig Niven, a landscape architect, to redesign the park and gardens. A new layout was approved and constructed. It featured a geometric layout, broader walkways, drinking fountains, rock garden and alpine beds. Coats then gifted the park to the people of Paisley. The park was renamed and opened officially on 26 May 1868. Nearby Love Street was named in homage to the original park owner. Renfrewshire Council are now responsible for the upkeep of the park.

== Grand Central Fountain ==
In the centre of the park an ornate fountain was constructed. The A listed fountain consists of dolphins, herons, cherubs and walruses. George Smith and Company of the Sun Foundry in Glasgow constructed the fountain. Stained-glass artist and designer Daniel Cottier was enlisted to paint and colour the monument.

A £650,000 restoration project took place between 2013–14 to restore the fountain, which had deteriorated. Renfrewshire Council, Historic Scotland and the Heritage Lottery Fund provided the necessary funding required to complete the work. There was a gala day in September 2014 to commemorate the restoration of the fountain. Provost Anne Hall, nearby residents and local youth theatre group Pace were part of the celebrations.

A statue of Robert Burns was erected in the gardens in 1896. It is sited adjacent to the fountain. It was constructed by Frederick William Pomeroy.

== Gallery ==
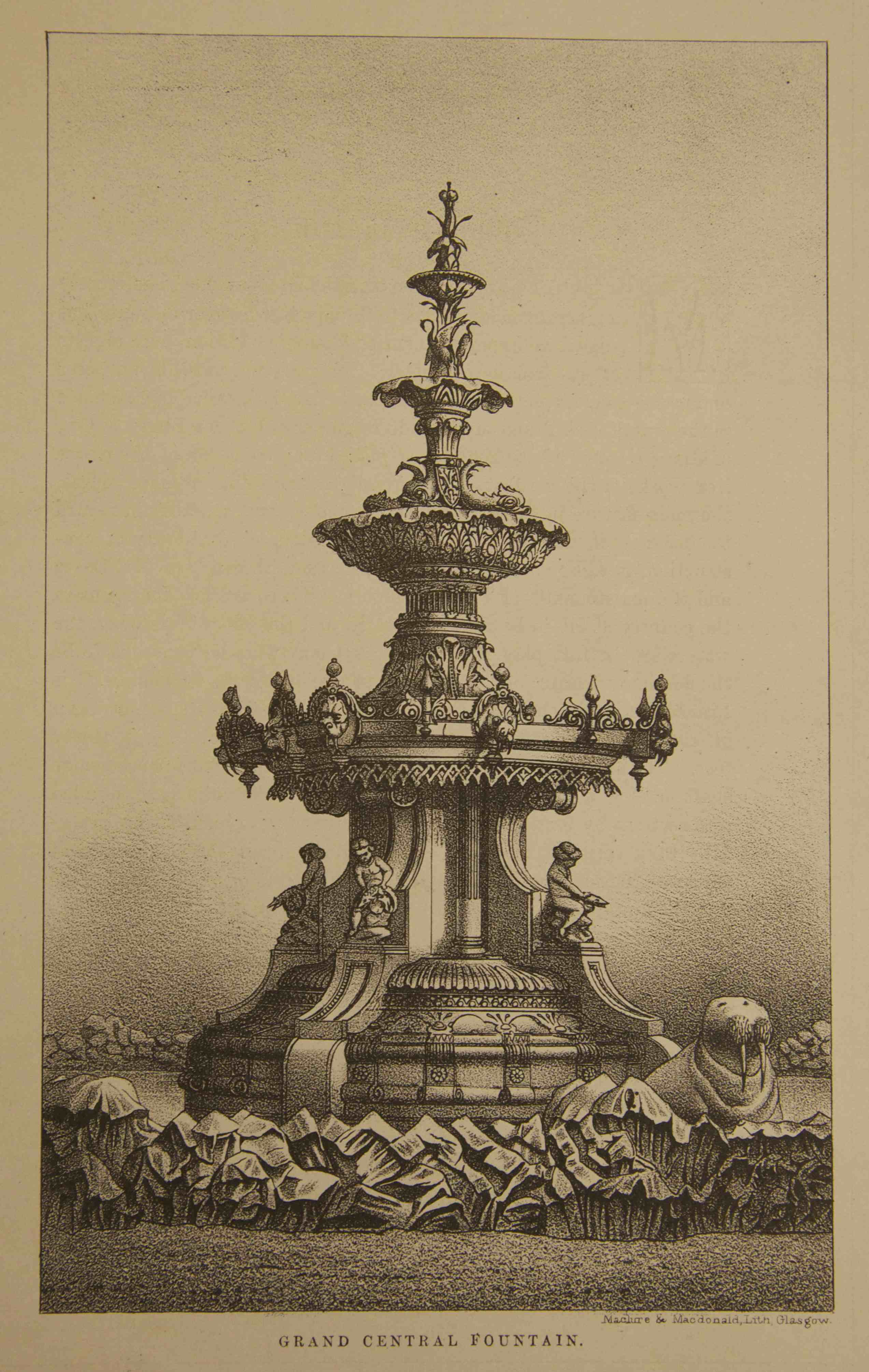
Grand Central Fountain pictured in 1868

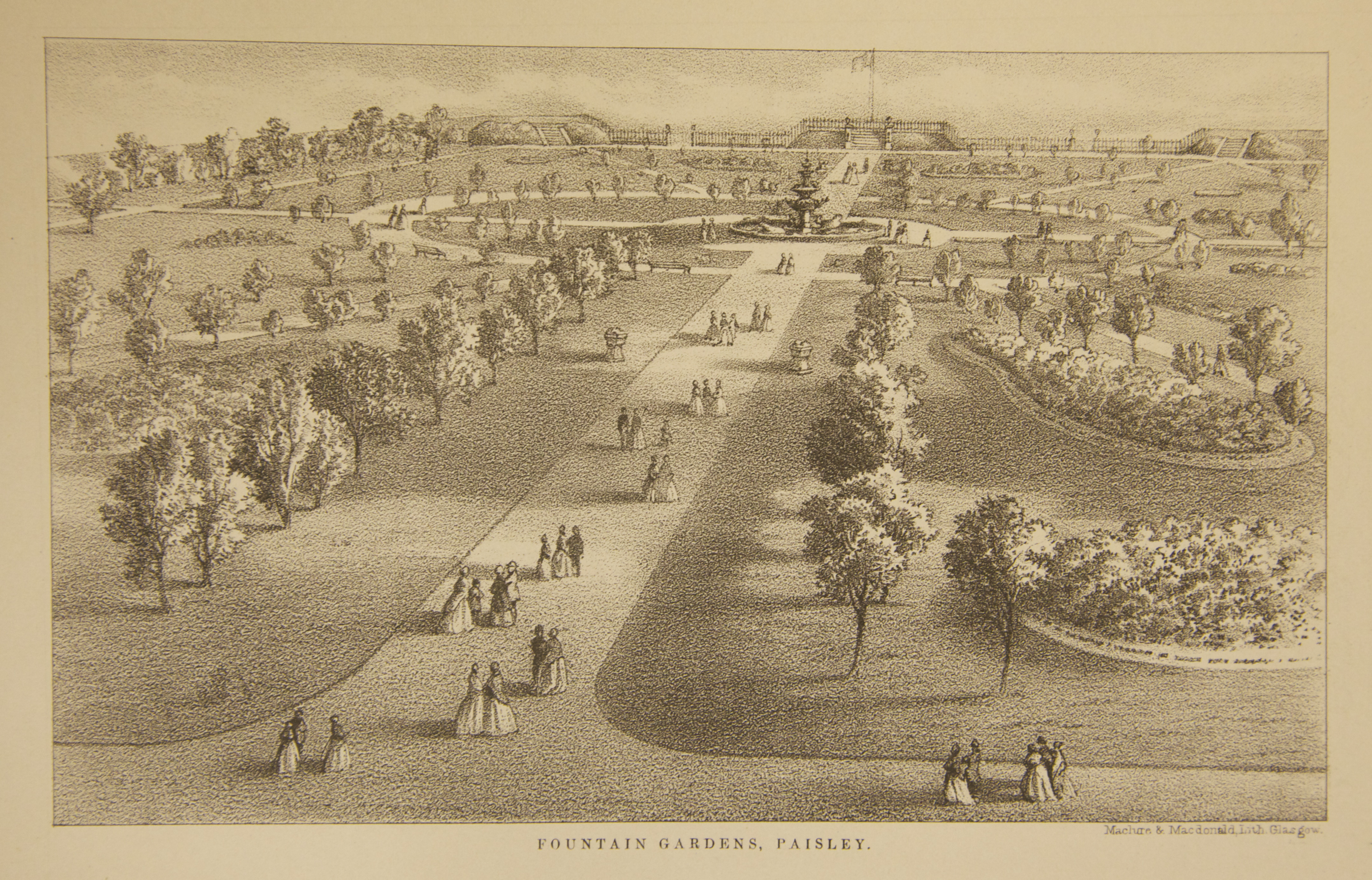
Contemporary lithograph of Fountain Gardens

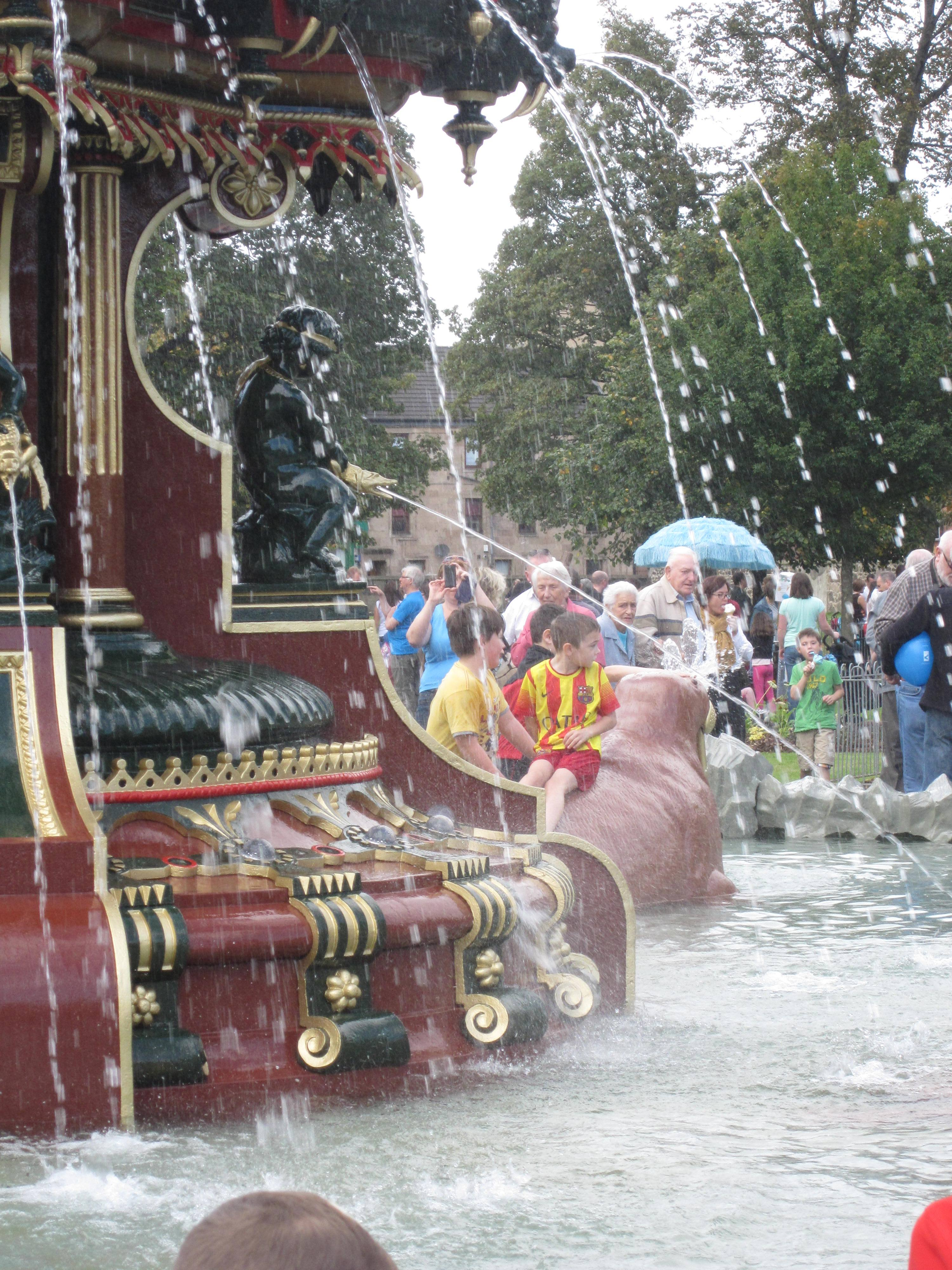
Paisley fountain restored, 2014
