= List of listed buildings in Renfrewshire =

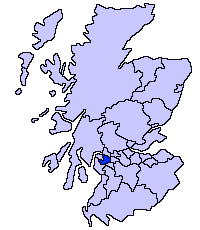
Renfrewshire shown within Scotland

This is a list of listed buildings in Renfrewshire. The list is split out by parish.

- List of listed buildings in Erskine, Renfrewshire
- List of listed buildings in Houston, Renfrewshire
- List of listed buildings in Inchinnan, Renfrewshire
- List of listed buildings in Johnstone, Renfrewshire
- List of listed buildings in Kilbarchan, Renfrewshire
- List of listed buildings in Lochwinnoch, Renfrewshire
- List of listed buildings in Paisley, Renfrewshire
- List of listed buildings in Renfrew, Renfrewshire

== See also ==
- Scheduled monuments in Renfrewshire
