= Renfrew Town Hall =

Municipal building in Renfrew, Scotland

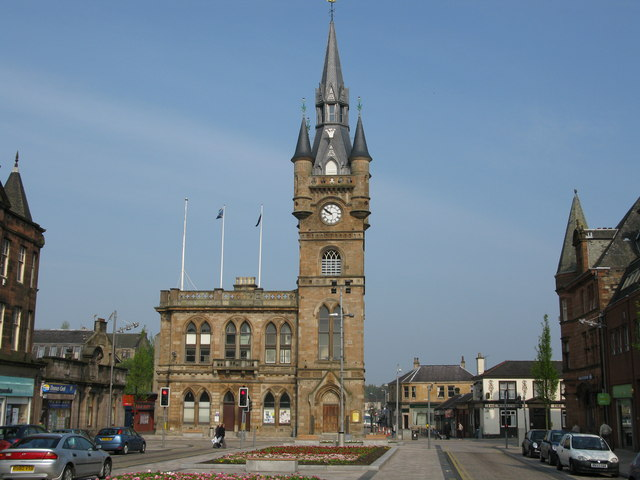
- Renfrew Town Hall

- Shown in Renfrewshire
- 55.8789°N 4.3873°W
- Location: Renfrew

History
- Built: 1873

Site notes
- Architect(s): James Jamieson Lamb and Baillie James Barr Lamb
- Architectural style: French Gothic style

Listed Building – Category A
- Designated: 14 October 1994
- Reference no.: LB40430

Renfrew Town Hall is a municipal facility at The Cross, Renfrew, Renfrewshire, Scotland. The town hall, which was the headquarters of the royal burgh of Renfrew, is a Category A listed building.

== History ==
The original town hall on the site was built in 1670; it was expanded with the construction of a new wing, creating a public hall on the ground floor and council chambers on the first floor, in 1826. However, after civic leaders decided that it was "very inadequate for any large public meeting or entertainment" and that "it was besides uncomfortable", the old town hall was demolished to make way for a new building.

The foundation stone for the new building was laid with full masonic honours by the local member of parliament, Colonel Archibald Campbell, on 13 April 1872. It designed by James Jamieson Lamb and Baillie James Barr Lamb in the French Gothic style, built at a cost of £7,500 and officially opened by Campbell on 17 October 1873. Following a serious fire on 6 March 1878, it was completely rebuilt in a very similar style but with a taller spire. The design involved an asymmetrical frontage with four bays facing Hairst Street; the left hand section of three bays featured a pair of gothic doors flanked by pairs of gothic widows on either side; there was a balcony and row of gothic windows on the first floor; the right hand bay featured a doorway with the burgh coat of arms in the gable head and a prominent 105 feet (32 m) high clock tower with bartizans. Internally, the principal rooms were the council chambers and the town clerk's office on the ground floor and the public hall on the first floor. Plasterwork bosses bearing the coats of arms of the burgh, the Bruce family and the Stewart family were installed in the public hall.

The town hall continued to be used as a public venue and concert performers included the contralto singer, Kathleen Ferrier, who made an appearance on 30 January 1946. The building was the seat of government of the royal burgh of Renfrew until it was replaced by Renfrew District under the wider Strathclyde Regional Council in May 1975. The district council was abolished in 1996, under the Local Government etc. (Scotland) Act 1994, and the building ceased to be a seat of government. Instead the town is represented by a community council, which meets in town hall.

After a programme of restoration works costing £5.2 million supported by the Heritage Lottery Fund, creating modern accommodation for the Renfrew Museum which had previously been based in the Brown Institute in Canal Street, the town hall was officially reopened as a visitor attraction by the Deputy First Minister of Scotland, Nicola Sturgeon, on 18 January 2012.

== See also ==
- List of Category A listed buildings in Renfrewshire
- List of city chambers and town halls in Scotland
- List of listed buildings in Renfrew, Renfrewshire
