= Robert Anning Bell =

English artist and designer (1863–1933)

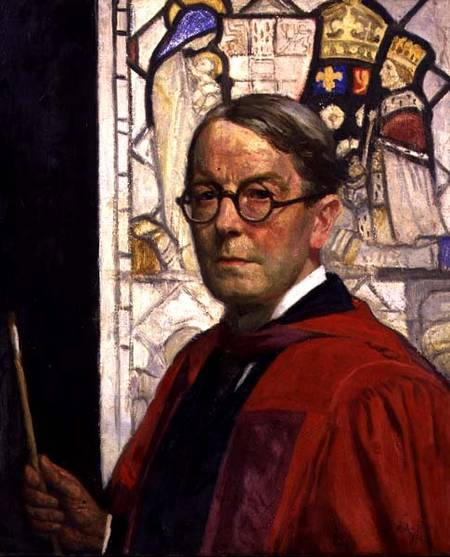
Self-portrait (c. 1910)

Robert Anning Bell RA (14 April 1863 – 27 November 1933) was an English artist and designer.

== Early life ==
Robert Anning Bell was born in London on 14 April 1863, the son of Robert George Bell, a cheesemonger, and Mary Charlotte Knight. He studied at University College School, the Westminster School of Art, and the Royal Academy Schools, followed by a time in Paris.

== Career ==
Bell was articled as an architect to his uncle, Samuel Knight.

On his return he shared a studio with George Frampton. With Frampton he created a series of designs for an altarpiece which was exhibited at the Arts and Crafts Exhibition Society and later installed in the Church of St Clare, Liverpool.

From 1895 to 1899 Bell was an instructor at the Liverpool University school of architecture. During this time he became associated with the Della Robbia Pottery in Birkenhead and also was becoming increasingly successful as a book designer and illustrator.

In 1911 Bell was appointed chief of the design section at the Glasgow School of Art, and from 1918 to 1924 he was professor of design at the Royal College of Art. He continued to paint and exhibited at the Royal Academy, the New English Art Club and the Royal Society of Painters in Water Colours, as well as at the Society of Graphic Art's first exhibition in 1921. In 1921 he was elected as Master of the Art Workers' Guild. He designed the great mosaic in the tympanum at Westminster Cathedral from sketches left by the architect John Francis Bentley; the work was completed in 1916. Bell worked from 1922 on mosaics for the Palace of Westminster. Depictions of Saint Patrick of Ireland and Saint Andrew of Scotland were erected in the Central Lobby; in Saint Stephen's Hall, one panel was erected depicting Saint Stephen, King Stephen and Edward the Confessor and another showing Edward III presenting the design for St Stephen's Chapel to his Master Mason, Michael of Canterbury. The last of these mosaics was unveiled in 1926.

== Personal life ==
In 1900, Bell married Amy Caroline Ditcham. After she died, he married in 1914 fellow artist Laura Richard who exhibited at the Royal Academy of Arts and the Paris Salon and whose work is in the permanent collection of the Tate Gallery. He had no children by either wife; Laura lost her only son (Charles Antoine Richard Troncy) by her previous husband (the artist Emile Troncy) in the First World War. Bell died in London on 27 November 1933, aged 70, and his ashes were interred in St James's Church, Piccadilly. A memorial to him lies above them.

== Gallery ==
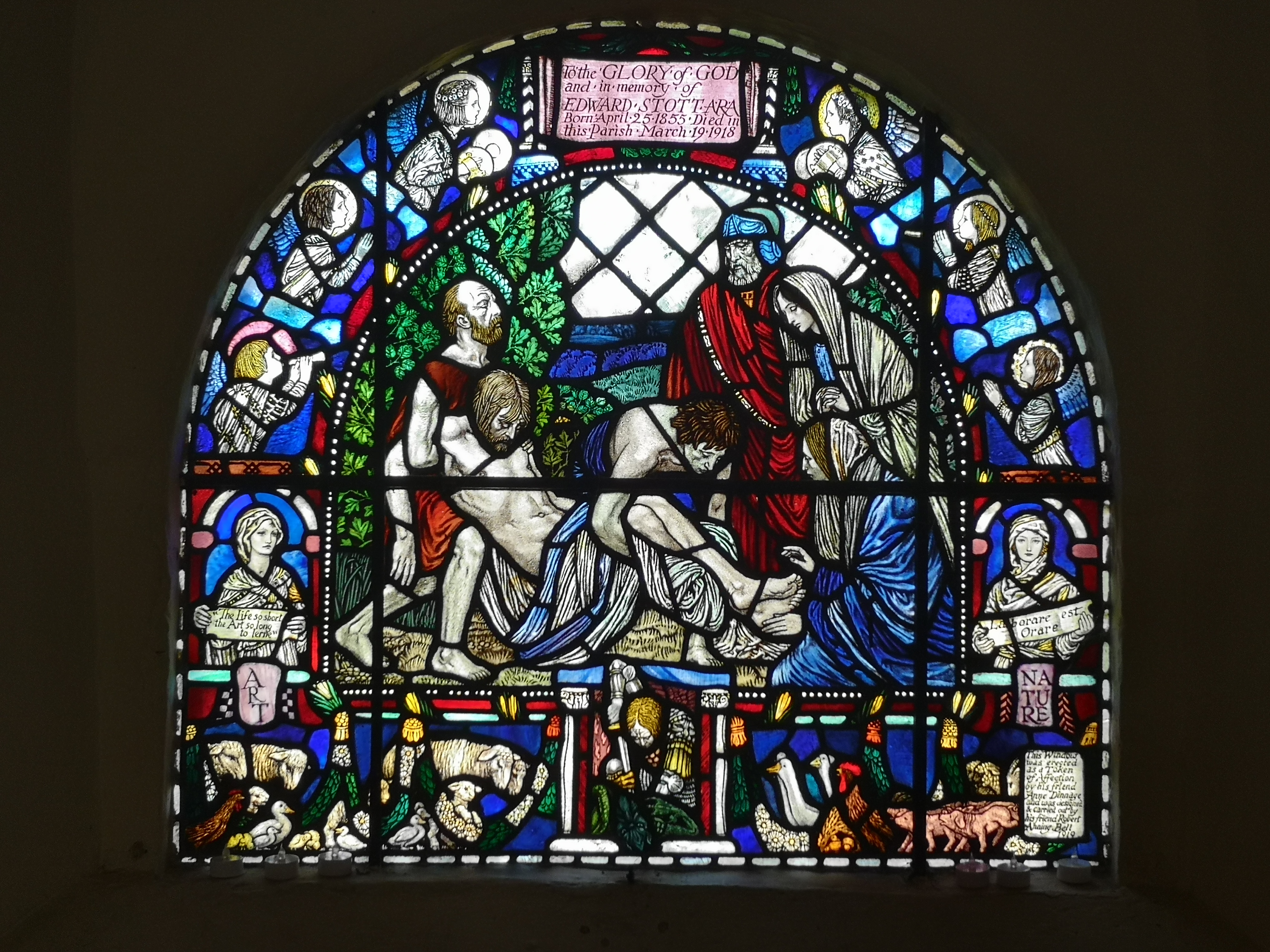
Stained-glass memorial for Edward Stott ARA at St Michael's Church, Amberley, West Sussex

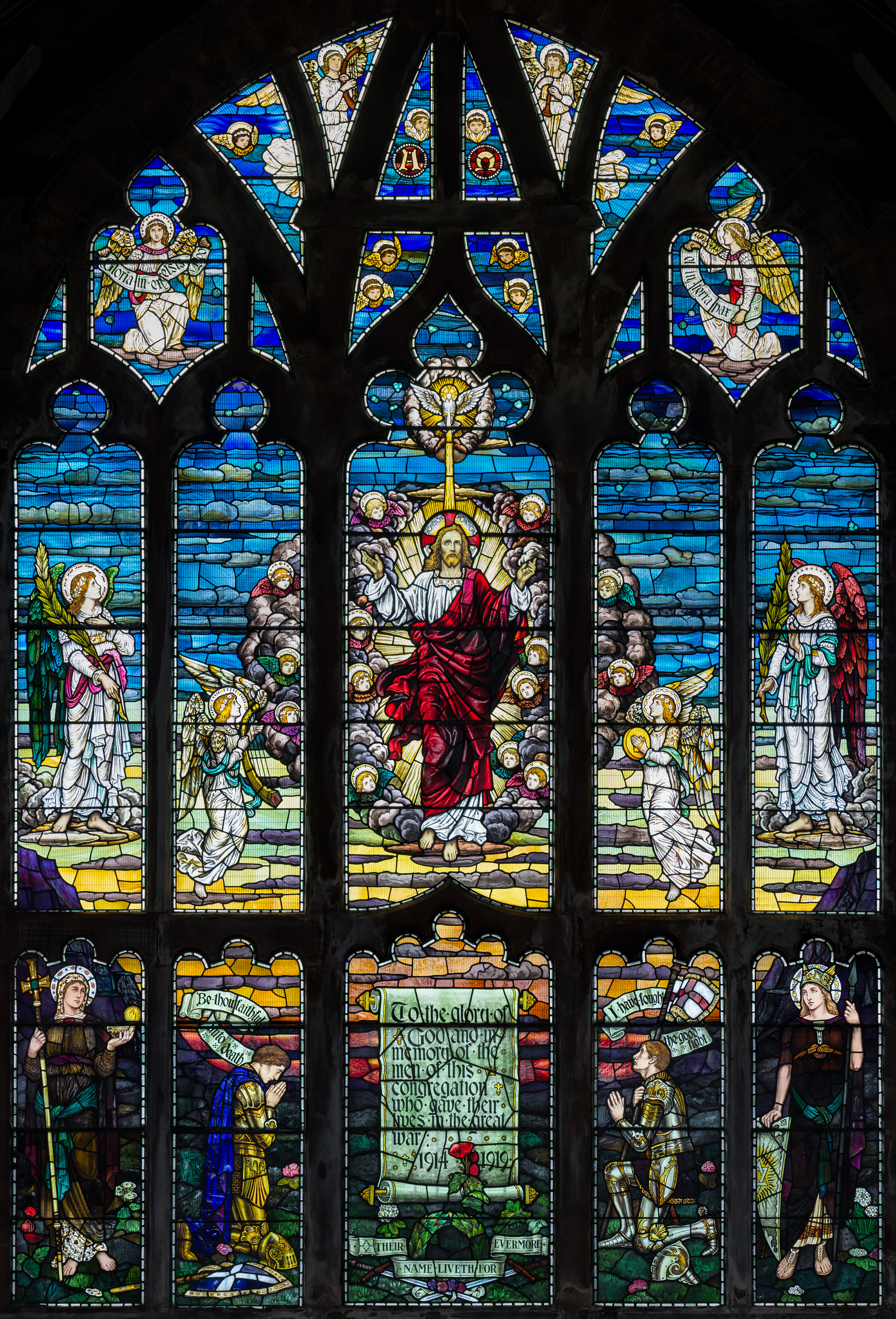
Stained-glass window in St Matthew's Church, Paisley

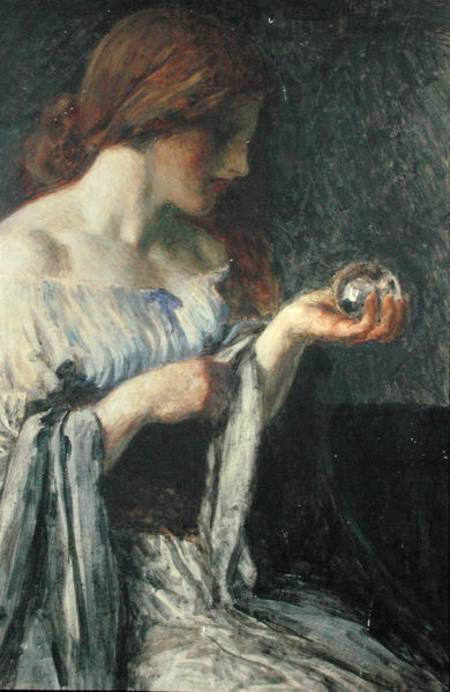
The Chrystal Ball

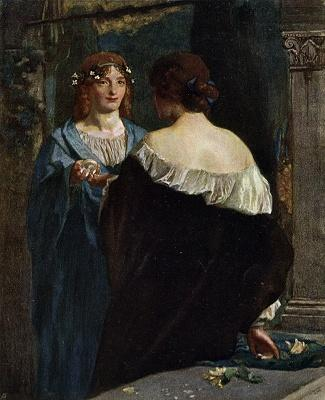
The Magic Chrystal

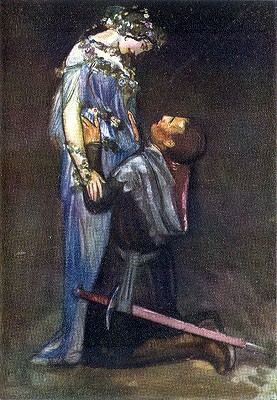
La belle dame sans merci

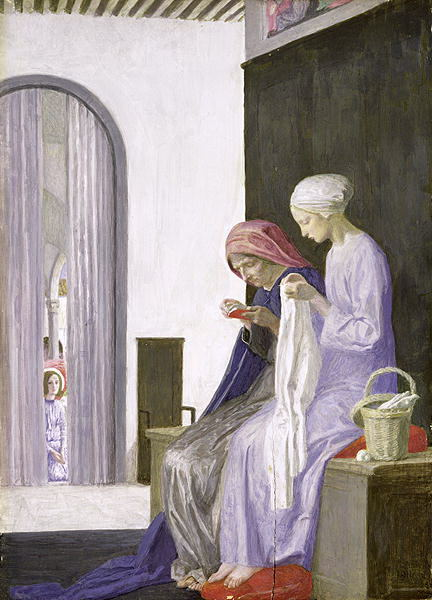
Mary in the House of Elizabeth

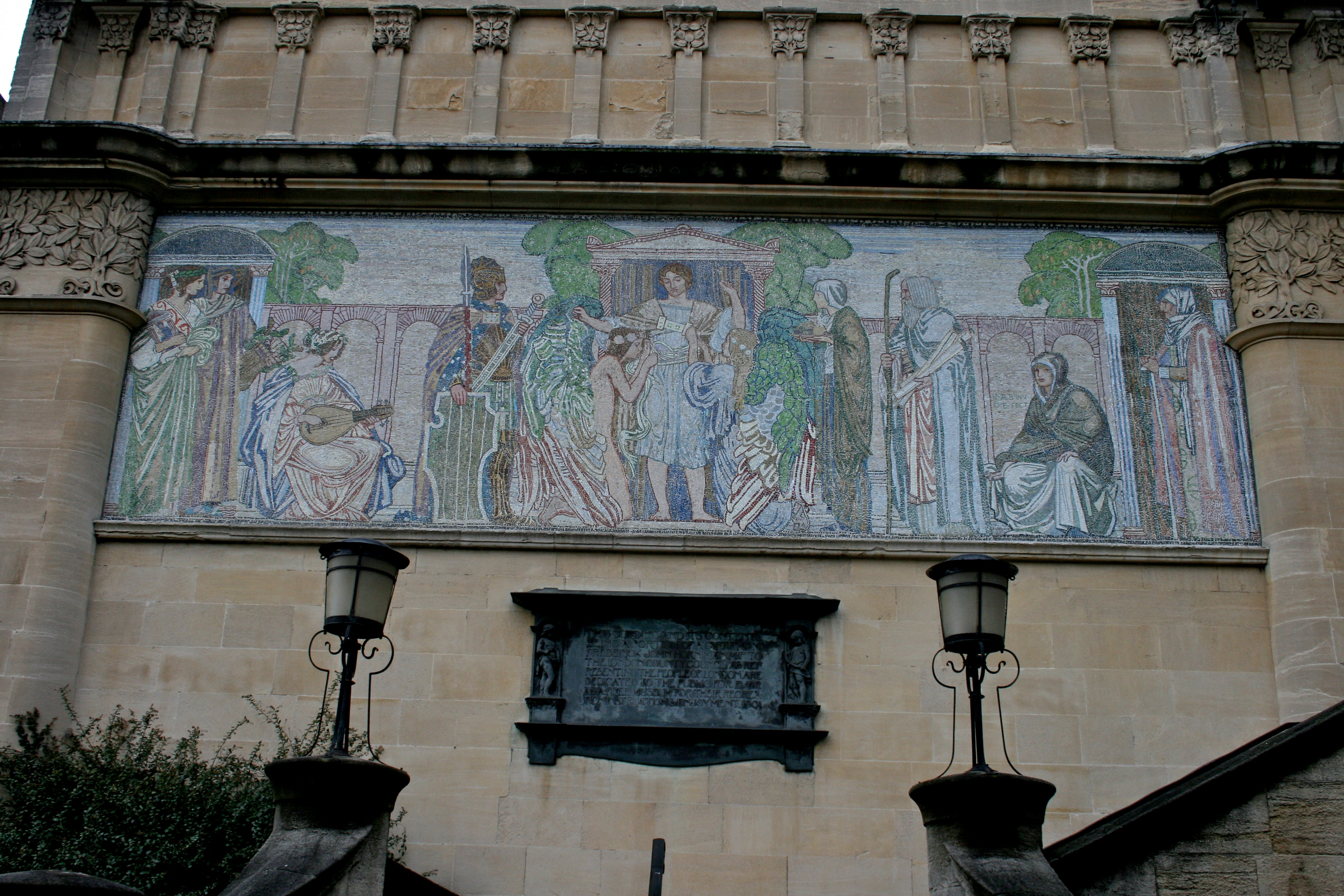
Horniman Museum mosaic

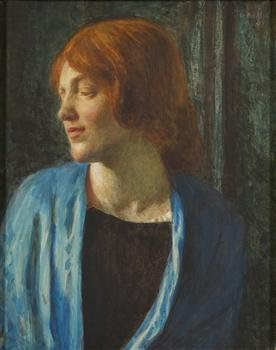
Portrait of a Woman

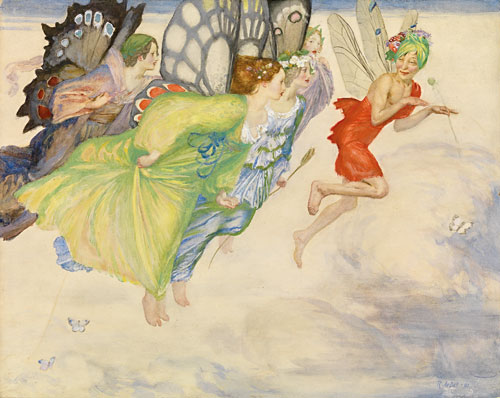
A Flight of Fairies, book illustration in gouache

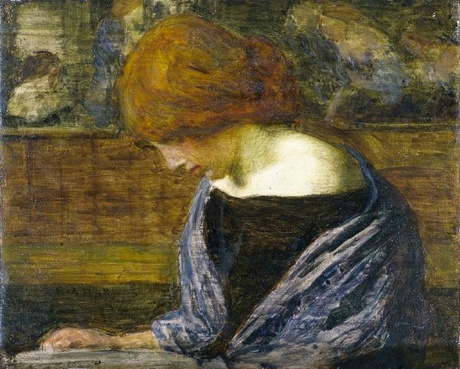
The Romance

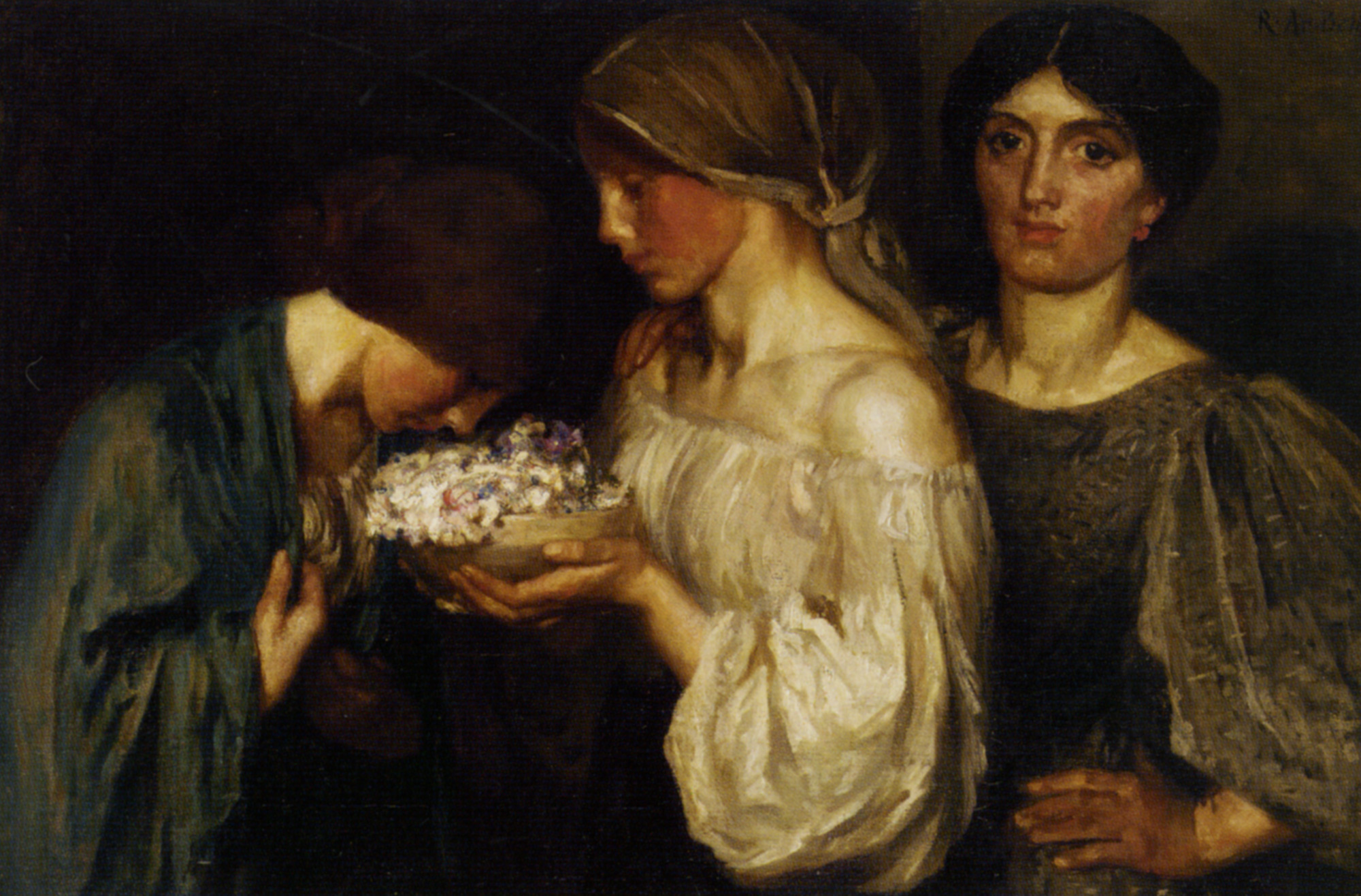
Fragrant Posy

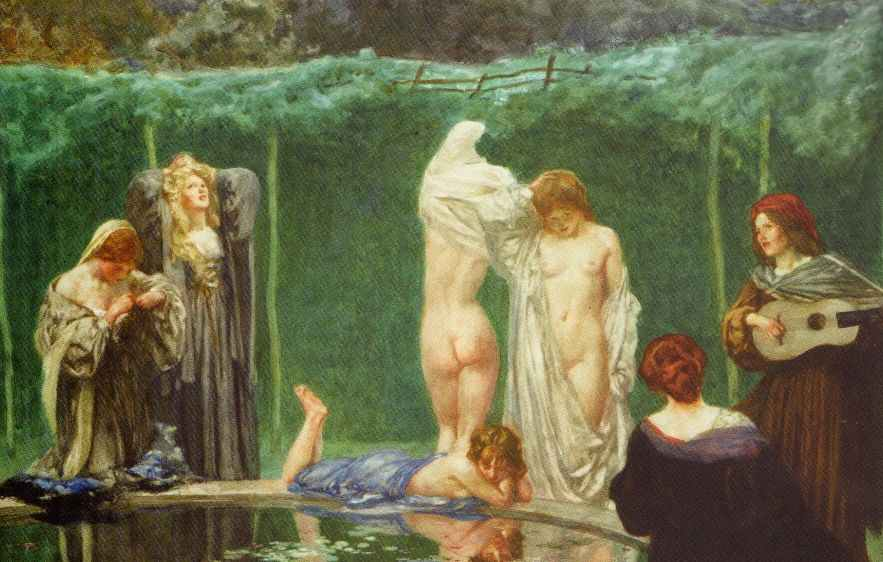
The Pool

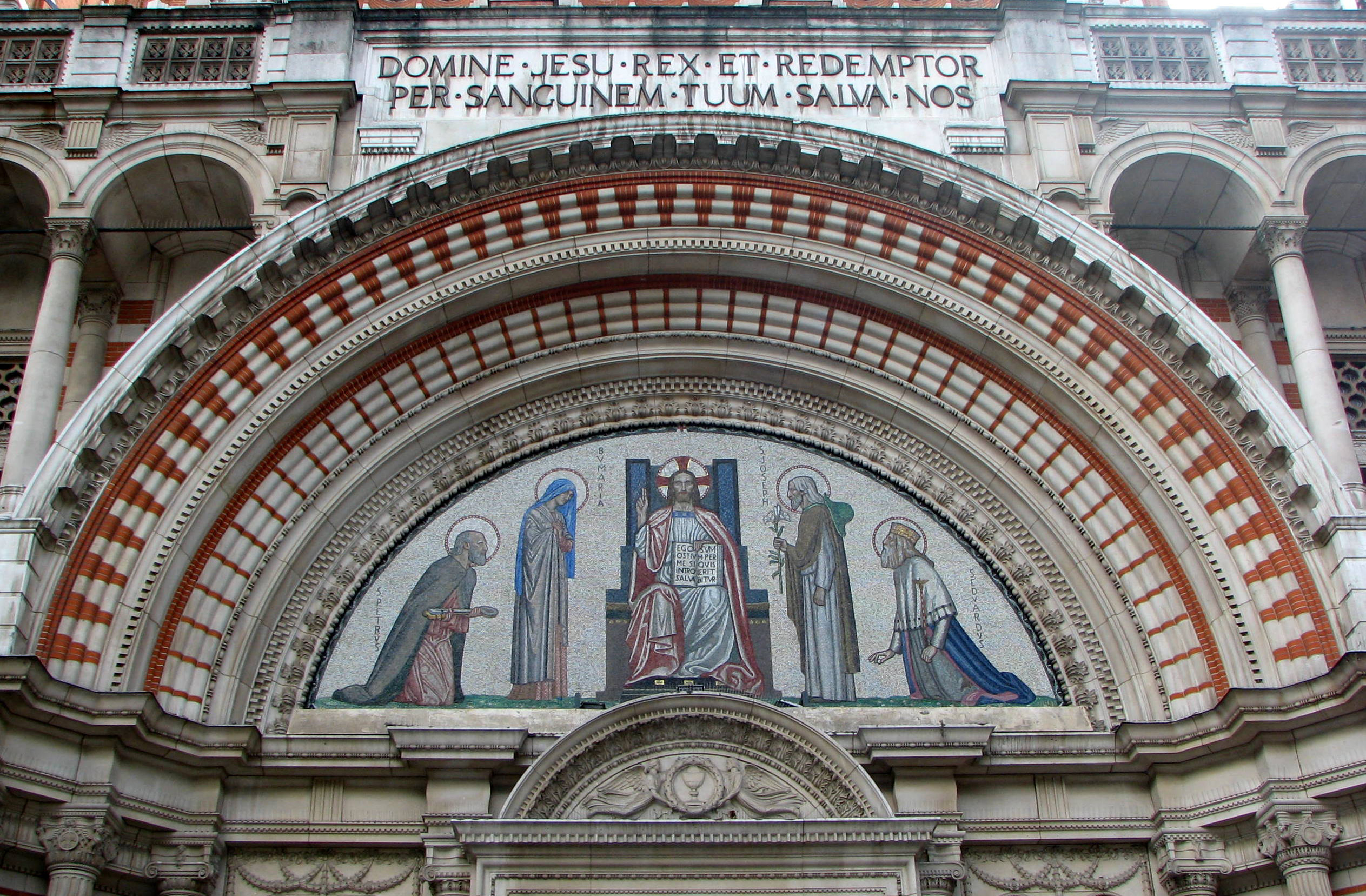
The tympanum at Westminster Cathedral
