= List of Category A listed buildings in Renfrewshire =

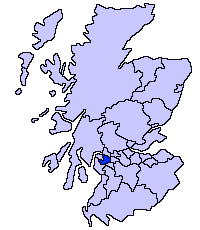
Renfrewshire shown within Scotland

This is a list of Category A listed buildings in the Renfrewshire council area in west-central Scotland.

In Scotland, the term listed building refers to a building or other structure officially designated as being of "special architectural or historic interest". Category A structures are those considered to be "buildings of national or international importance, either architectural or historic, or fine little-altered examples of some particular period, style or building type." Listing was begun by a provision in the Town and Country Planning (Scotland) Act 1947, and the current legislative basis for listing is the Planning (Listed Buildings and Conservation Areas) (Scotland) Act 1997. The authority for listing rests with Historic Environment Scotland, an executive agency of the Scottish Government. Once listed, severe restrictions are imposed on the modifications allowed to a building's structure or its fittings. Listed building consent must be obtained from local authorities prior to any alteration to such a structure. There are approximately 47,400 listed buildings in Scotland, of which around 8% (some 3,800) are Category A.

The council area of Renfrewshire covers 261 square kilometres (101 sq mi), and has a population of around 169,800. There are 39 Category A listed buildings in the area.

== Listed buildings ==
Name	Location	Date listed	Geo-coordinates	Notes	LB number	Image
Formakin House	Bishopton	10 June 1971	55°54′20″N 4°32′43″W		10903	Upload another image See more images
Mar Hall Hotel (Former portion of Erskine Hospital, formerly Erskine House)	Erskine		55°55′15″N 4°28′44″W		10909	Upload another image See more images
Parish Church and Hall, Lochwinnoch	Lochwinnoch, Church Street		55°47′38″N 4°37′43″W		12654	Upload another image See more images
Two monuments within Houston and Kilellan Church	Houston and Killellan		55°52′14″N 4°32′34″W		12695	Upload Photo
Northbar House	Inchinnan		55°53′33″N 4°25′51″W		12730	Upload Photo
Inchinnan Bridge over Black Cart Water	Renfrew, Greenock Road		55°52′50″N 4°24′42″W		12732	Upload another image See more images
Kilbarchan Steeple and Steeple Buildings	Kilbarchan, Steeple Square		55°50′10″N 4°33′06″W		12839	Upload another image
Weaver's Cottage	Kilbarchan, The Cross		55°50′10″N 4°33′14″W		12843	Upload another image See more images
India of Inchinnan office range	Inchinnan, Greenock Road		55°53′11″N 4°26′25″W		13459	Upload another image See more images
Paisley Abbey	Paisley, Abbey Close		55°50′42″N 4°25′13″W		38910	Upload another image See more images
Place of Paisley	Paisley, Abbey Close		55°50′41″N 4°25′14″W		38911	Upload another image
Anchor Mills, former Domestic Finishing Mill	Paisley, Anchor Thread Works		55°50′31″N 4°25′06″W		38915	Upload another image See more images
Anchor Mills, Mile End Mill	Paisley, Anchor Thread Works		55°50′34″N 4°24′39″W		38917	Upload another image See more images
Blackhall Railway Viaduct (previously Blackhall Aqueduct) over the White Cart Water	Paisley		55°50′24″N 4°24′23″W		38923	Upload another image See more images
Russell Institute	Paisley, Causeyside Street		55°50′37″N 4°25′26″W		38944	Upload another image See more images
Paisley High Church	Paisley, Church Hill		55°50′46″N 4°25′41″W		38946	Upload another image See more images
Christian Social Action Centre	Paisley, Church Hill, Middle Church		55°50′45″N 4°25′38″W		38948	Upload another image
War Memorial	Paisley, The Cross		55°50′44″N 4°25′27″W		38953	Upload another image See more images
George A. Clark Town Hall	Paisley, Gauze Street		55°50′42″N 4°25′19″W		38978	Upload another image See more images
7 Gilmour Street, Clydesdale Bank	Paisley, Gilmour Street		55°50′46″N 4°25′26″W		38994	Upload Photo
St Matthew's Church	Paisley, Gordon Street		55°50′33″N 4°25′19″W		39007	Upload another image See more images
Hawkhead Hospital, Wards 7 and 8	Paisley, Hawkhead		55°50′04″N 4°23′29″W		39011	Upload another image
Museum, Art Gallery and Library	Paisley, High Street		55°50′43″N 4°25′49″W		39025	Upload another image See more images
Thomas Coats Memorial Baptist Church	Paisley, High Street		55°50′41″N 4°25′57″W		39027	Upload another image See more images
Love Street Fountain	Paisley, Fountain Gardens		55°51′01″N 4°25′44″W		39035	Upload another image See more images
Crosbie	Paisley, Moredun Road		55°49′42″N 4°26′50″W		39049	Upload Photo
The Bull Inn	Paisley, New Street		55°50′41″N 4°25′34″W		39058	Upload another image
Former John Neilson Institution and Entrance Lodge	Paisley, Oakshaw Road		55°50′43″N 4°26′03″W		39069	Upload another image See more images
Coats Observatory	Paisley, Oakshaw Street		55°50′44″N 4°25′52″W		39072	Upload another image See more images
Sheriff Court House	Paisley, St James Street		55°50′55″N 4°25′37″W		39103	Upload another image See more images
Two monuments within Renfrew Old Parish Church	Renfrew, High Street		55°52′40″N 4°23′11″W		40417	Upload Photo
White Cart Bridge, over part of White Cart Water	Renfrew, Inchinnan Road		55°52′49″N 4°24′38″W		40424	Upload another image See more images
Rolling Lift Bridge over White Cart Water	Renfrew, Inchinnan Road		55°52′48″N 4°24′35″W		40425	Upload another image See more images
Renfrew Town Hall	Renfrew, The Cross		55°52′44″N 4°23′14″W		40430	Upload another image See more images
Paisley Grammar School, Penilee Sports Pavilion	Paisley, Penilee Road		55°50′56″N 4°22′44″W		43679	Upload Photo

== See also ==
- Scheduled monuments in Renfrewshire
