= Russell Institute =

Building in Paisley, Scotland

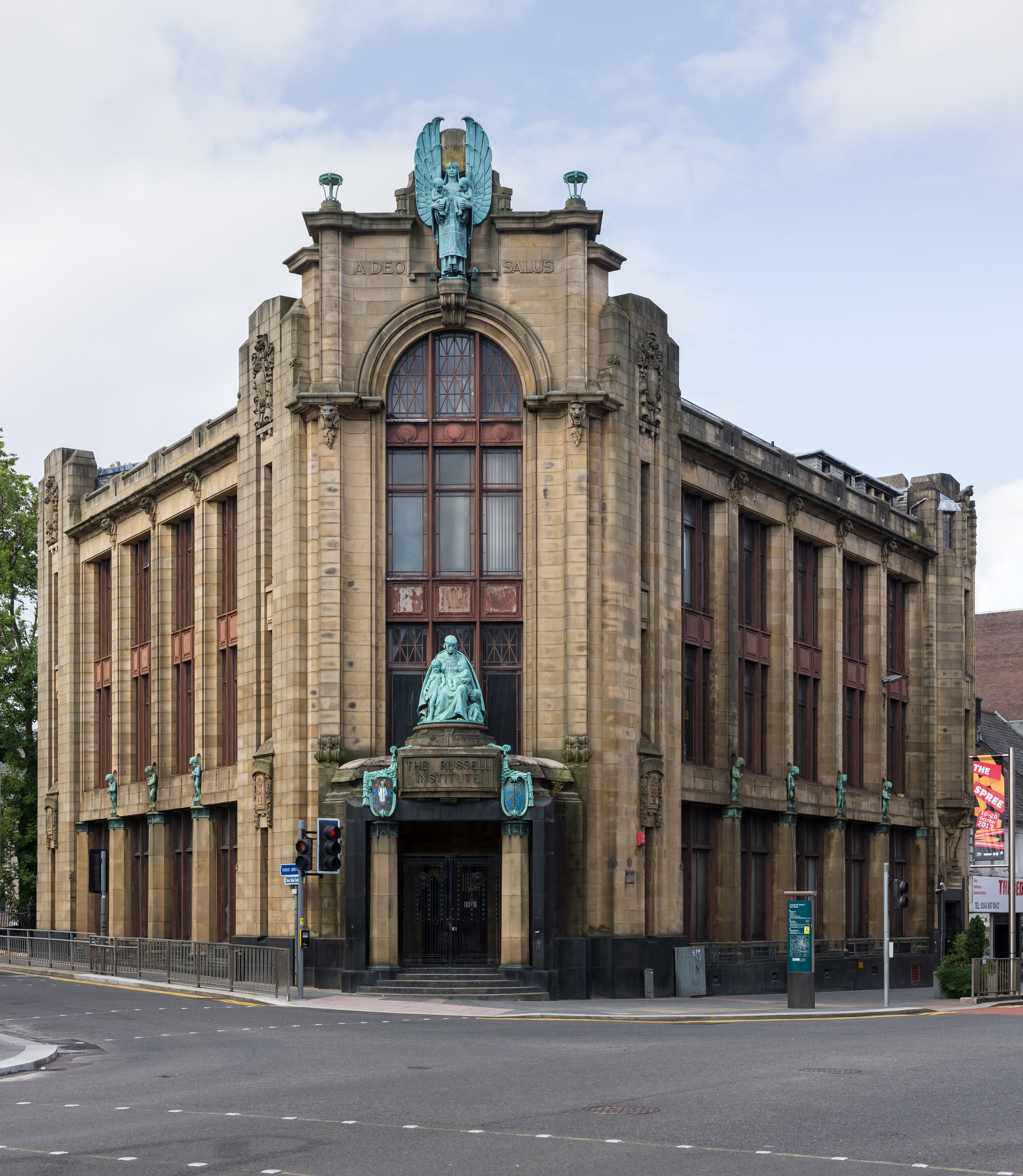
- Interactive map of the Russell Institute area

General information
- Status: Open
- Location: 30 Causeyside Street, Paisley, Scotland
- Inaugurated: 19 March 1927

Technical details
- Floor count: 3

Design and construction
- Architect: J S Maitland
- Architecture firm: Abercrombie and Maitland
- Designations: Category A

The Russell Institute is a building in Paisley, Scotland.

== History ==
The building was generously donated by Agnes Russell to the Burgh of Paisley as a memorial to her two brothers, Thomas and Robert Russell, who died in 1913 and 1920 respectively. Initially, it served as a child welfare clinic, but today, Renfrewshire Council utilizes it as a multi purpose facility. This historic building is protected and listed as Category A listed building.

== See also ==
- List of Category A listed buildings in Renfrewshire
- List of listed buildings in Paisley, Renfrewshire
