= White Cart Bridge =

Bridge in Renfrewshrie, Scotland

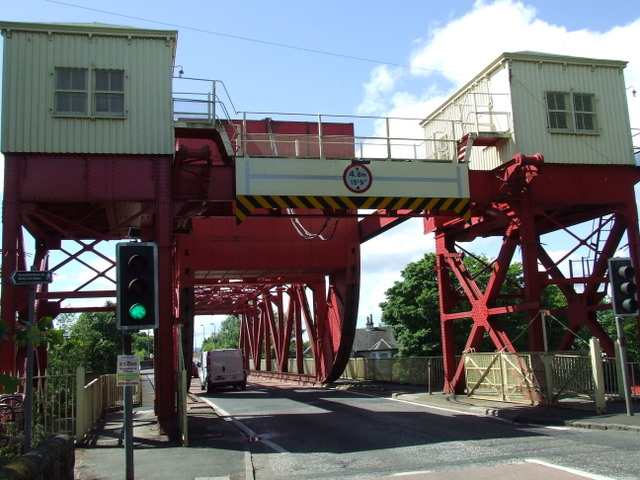
- Coordinates: 55.8800°N 4.4091°W
- Carries: A8
- Crosses: White Cart Water
- Locale: Renfrew
- Owner: Renfrewshire council

Characteristics
- Design: Bascule

History
- Designer: Sir William Arrol; Sir William Arrol & Co
- Opened: 1923
- Replaces: Old White Cart Bridge

Listed Building – Category A
- Official name: Rolling Lift Bridge Over White Cart Water
- Designated: 13 December 1994
- Reference no.: LB40425

Location
- Interactive map of White Cart Bridge

White Cart Bridge is a Scherzer rolling lift bascule bridge situated on the A8 road in Renfrew, Scotland. The bridge crosses White Cart Water at the confluence with the Black Cart River. It is one of only two remaining Scherzer type rolling lift bridges in the country, the other being 'the Queenie' at Peterhead Harbour, and became category A listed on 13 December 1994. The bridge is still capable of opening, as the Doosan Babcock factory in Renfrew requires the capability to move large loads by river.

== History ==
The White Cart and Black Cart Rivers have been an important crossing site for many years. Initially, people forded the rivers and latterly, a ferry was used to make the crossing. A bridge built in 1759 was a seven-arch bridge, crossing both rivers, but was washed away in 1809. Two separate bridges, still in use today, were built in 1812 as a replacement for the crossing. The new bridges could not accommodate large ships sailing into Paisley.

A new section of river bypassing the low bridge was completed by 1838, requiring a new bridge to cross the White Cart. Initially, a swing bridge was used to make the crossing. It was replaced by the lift bridge in 1923. The name "swing bridge" has remained locally, though the bridge lifts, rather than swings. The original channel bypassed by the cut under the new bridge gradually silted up, and the old bridge is now landlocked.

The bridge was designed by Scottish civil engineer William Bertram Hall working for William Arrol & Co, who built some of the most famous bridges in the United Kingdom, including the Forth Bridge and Tower Bridge. They were responsible for the construction of the bridge at Renfrew.

In August 2004, a £1m restoration project in connection with Historic Scotland took place. This involved renewing all the mechanical components and resurfacing the road. The bridge was also painted red and cream and had new lights installed.

A film and poem were commissioned to mark the centenary of the bridge completion in March 2023, and in May 2024 the bridge was awarded a red wheel plaque and listing with the National Transport Trust.

== Gallery ==
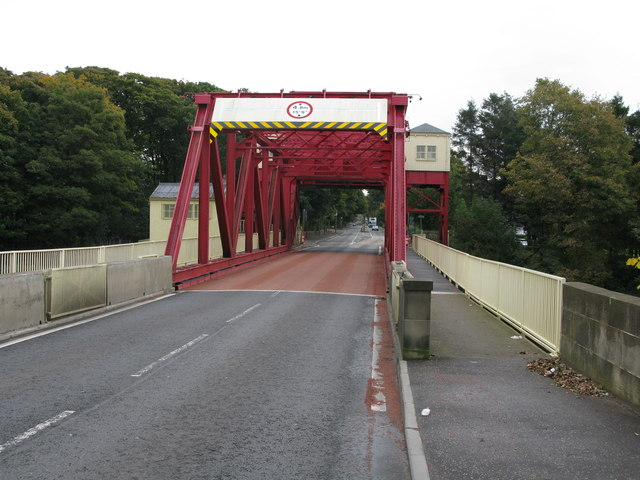
Bridge after restoration project

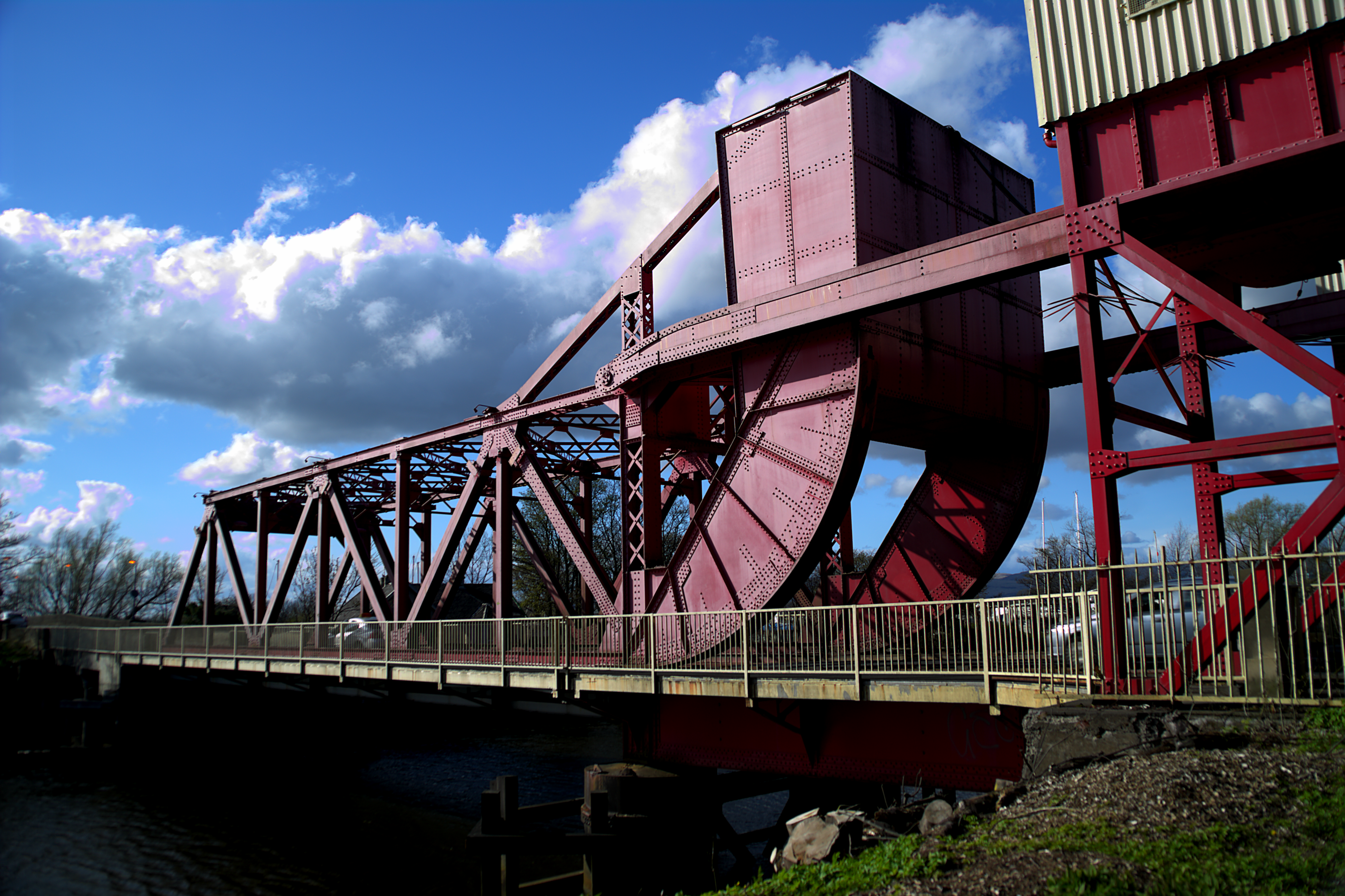
View from river bank

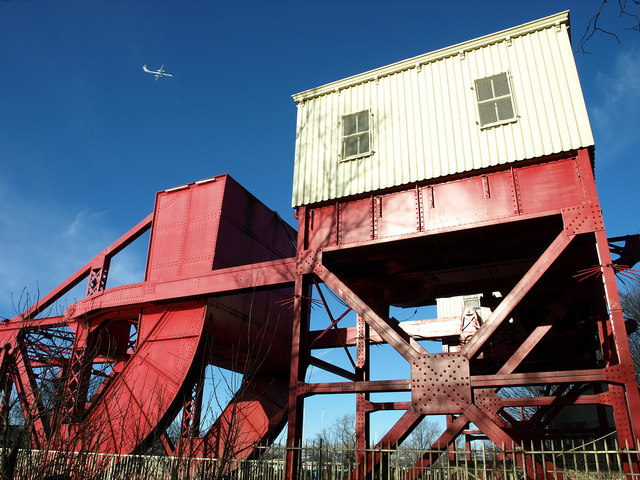
Engine house and counterbalance weight

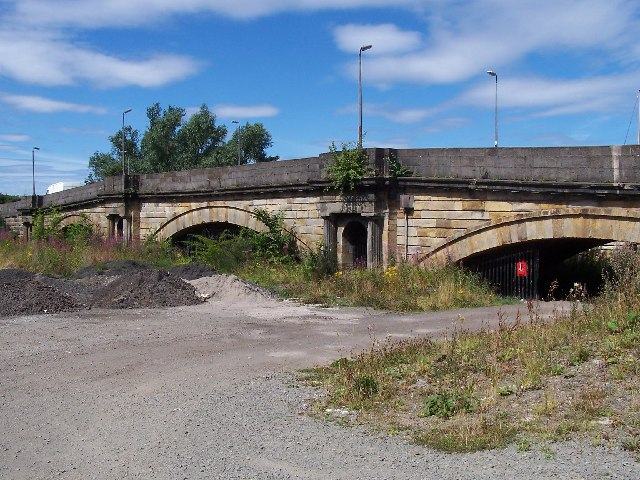
Old White Cart bridge

== See also ==
- List of bascule bridges
- List of bridges in the United Kingdom
- List of Category A listed buildings in Renfrewshire
- List of listed buildings in Renfrew, Renfrewshire
