= George Aitken Clark =

Scottish manufacturer and benefactor (1823–1873)

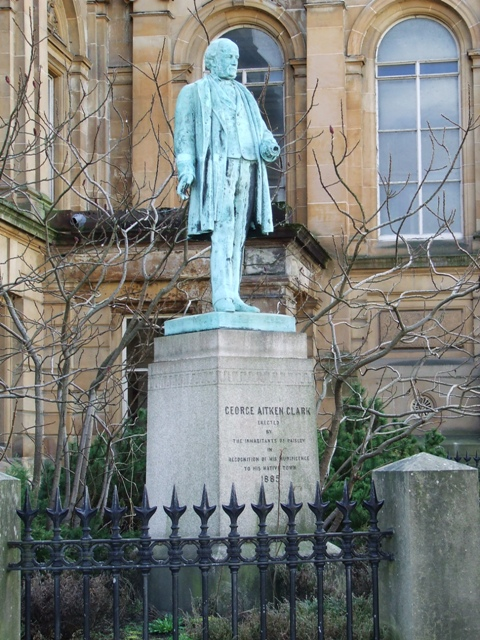
- George Aitken Clark, statue next to Paisley Town Hall, by John Mossman
- Born: 1823
- Died: 1873 (aged 49–50)
- Occupation: manufacturer

George Aitken Clark (1823–1873) was a Scottish manufacturer and benefactor.

== Life ==
He was the son of John Clark, a thread manufacturer in Paisley, where he was born on 9 August 1823. He was educated at Paisley grammar school, and in 1840 was sent the firm of Kerr & Co. of Hamilton, Ontario. On reaching manhood he returned to Paisley, and entered into partnership with Messrs. Robert and John Ronald, shawlmakers, under the name of "Ronald & Clark".

In 1851 Clark gave up his partnership to go into with his brother-in-law, Robert Kerr, as a thread manufacturer. To extend the business he went in 1856 to the United States, and to avoid the tariffs the firm in 1864 established a factory at Newark, New Jersey. It was a success, and Clark's O.N.T. spool cotton soon became a recognised American brand. In 1866 the firm amalgamated with the original firm of Clark under the name of Clark & Co., with an anchor as their trade-mark. Clark died at Newark on 13 February 1873.

== Legacy ==
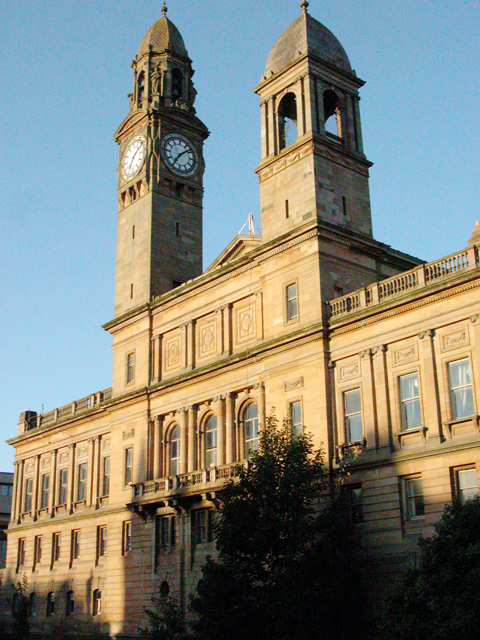
Paisley Town Hall

By his will Clark left £20,000 for scholarships at Glasgow University, and £20,000 to build a town hall in Paisley. The firm of Clark & Co. subscribed a further £40,000, and the building then styled the George A. Clark Town Hall was opened in 1882. The architect was William Henry Lynn.

== Notes ==
Attribution

This article incorporates text from a publication now in the public domain: Stephen, Leslie, ed. (1887). "Clark, George Aitken". Dictionary of National Biography. Vol. 10. London: Smith, Elder & Co.
