= St Matthew's Church, Paisley =

St Matthew's Church
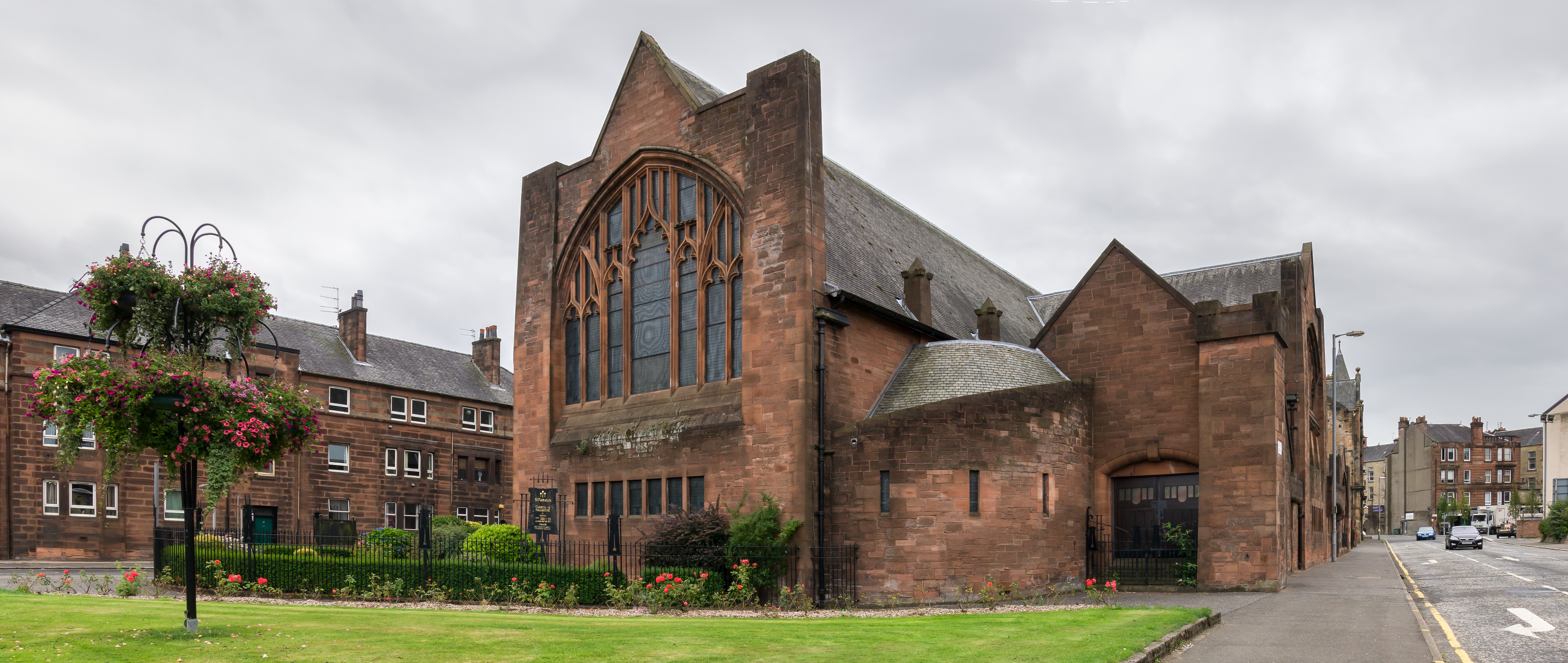

- Location within Renfrewshire
- 55.842290°N 4.421220°W
- Location: Paisley
- Country: Scotland
- Denomination: Church of the Nazarene
- Previous denomination: Church of Scotland
- Website: St Matthew's Church of the Nazarene

History
- Founded: 1907

Architecture
- Architect: William Daniel McLennan
- Style: Art Nouveau and Perpendicular Gothic

St Matthew's Church in Paisley is notable for its Art Nouveau architecture by WD McLennan, and stained glass window by Robert Anning Bell.

The church was built between 1905 and 1907 (119 years ago) and shares a small traffic island on Gordon Street with a (now disused) fire station. Originally called St George's East Free Church, it became a Church of Scotland with reunification in 1929, and was later renamed St Matthew's. Due to falling numbers, the church closed in 1988 and was taken over by the Church of the Nazarene, who had previously been meeting in a hall in nearby Orchard Street. Twenty-eight existing members St Matthews joined with the congregation from the Nazarene church.

The architecture of St Matthew's is described by Historic Scotland as an "Art Nouveau interpretation of Perpendicular Gothic". It was designed by William Daniel McLennan, from Paisley, who was himself a member of the congregation. McLennan, a contemporary of Charles Rennie Mackintosh, was notable for his Art Nouveau architecture, which is found in a number of houses in Paisley as well as the Bull Inn and another church in the Ralston area of the town. The original plans included a massive spire but this idea was abandoned. McLennan also designed the interior furnishings, including the organ case, font and pulpit, and exterior features such as the railings and notice board.

The church interior consists of a wide nave with galleries to the right side and the rear. The pulpit on the left-hand side features a wooden crown of thorns above. The right of the choir features a large organ, which is still in use. A number of small rooms are found around the church along with halls to the rear. A tulip motif appears throughout the building, featuring on woodwork, stone, stained glass, the pulpit's brass lectern, and even the light switches. The windows are mostly plain white with small coloured-glass features. The exception is the huge stained-glass window on the west side behind the choir, which is by Robert Anning Bell. This is not the original (which was similar in design to the others) but was replaced as a memorial to the Great War.

St Matthew's bears comparison with Mackintosh's Queen's Cross Church in Glasgow (which is no longer used as a church). Some consider it to be the most significant Art Nouveau church in Scotland.

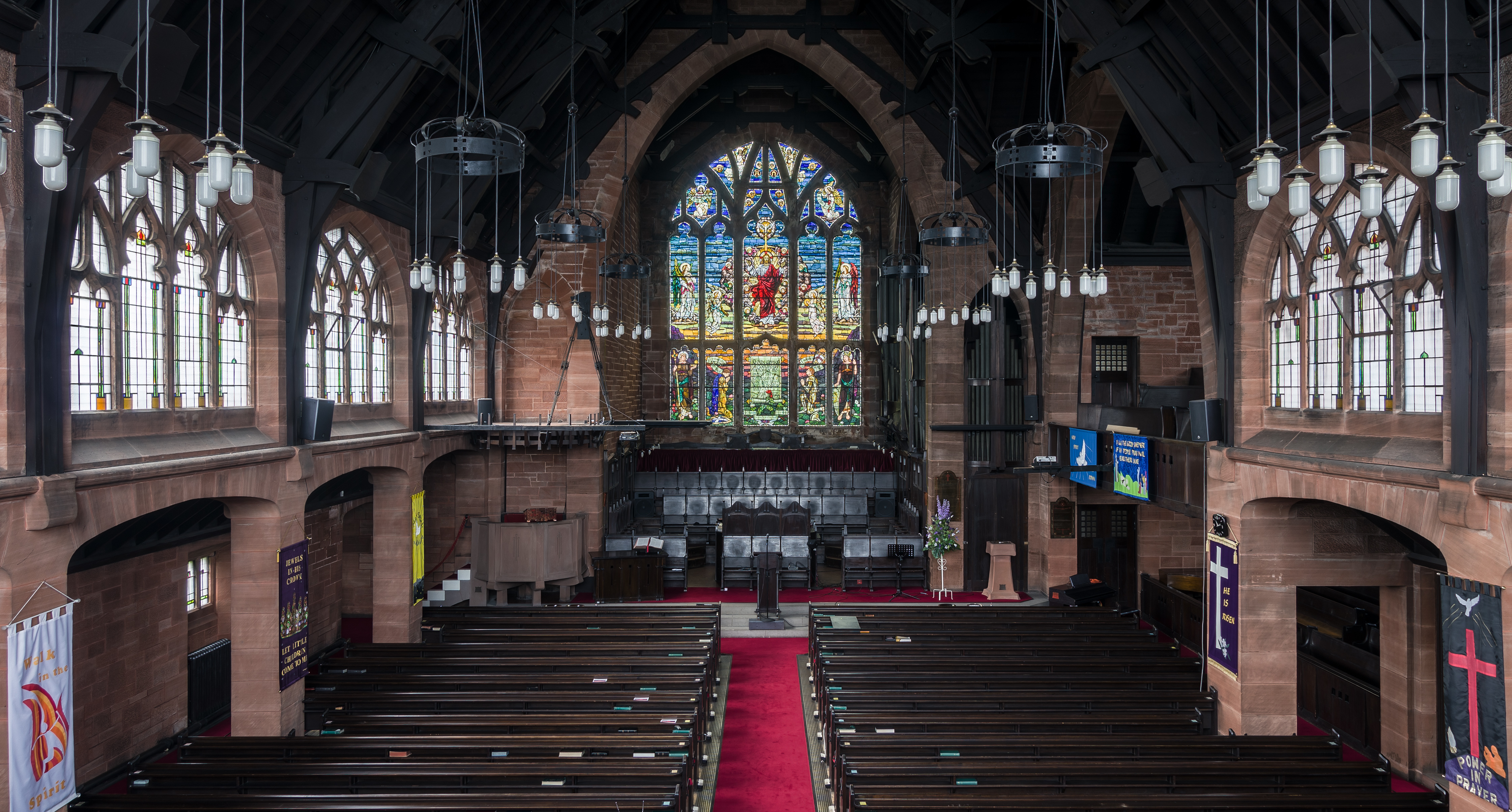
The interior viewed from the rear gallery

== Art Nouveau details ==
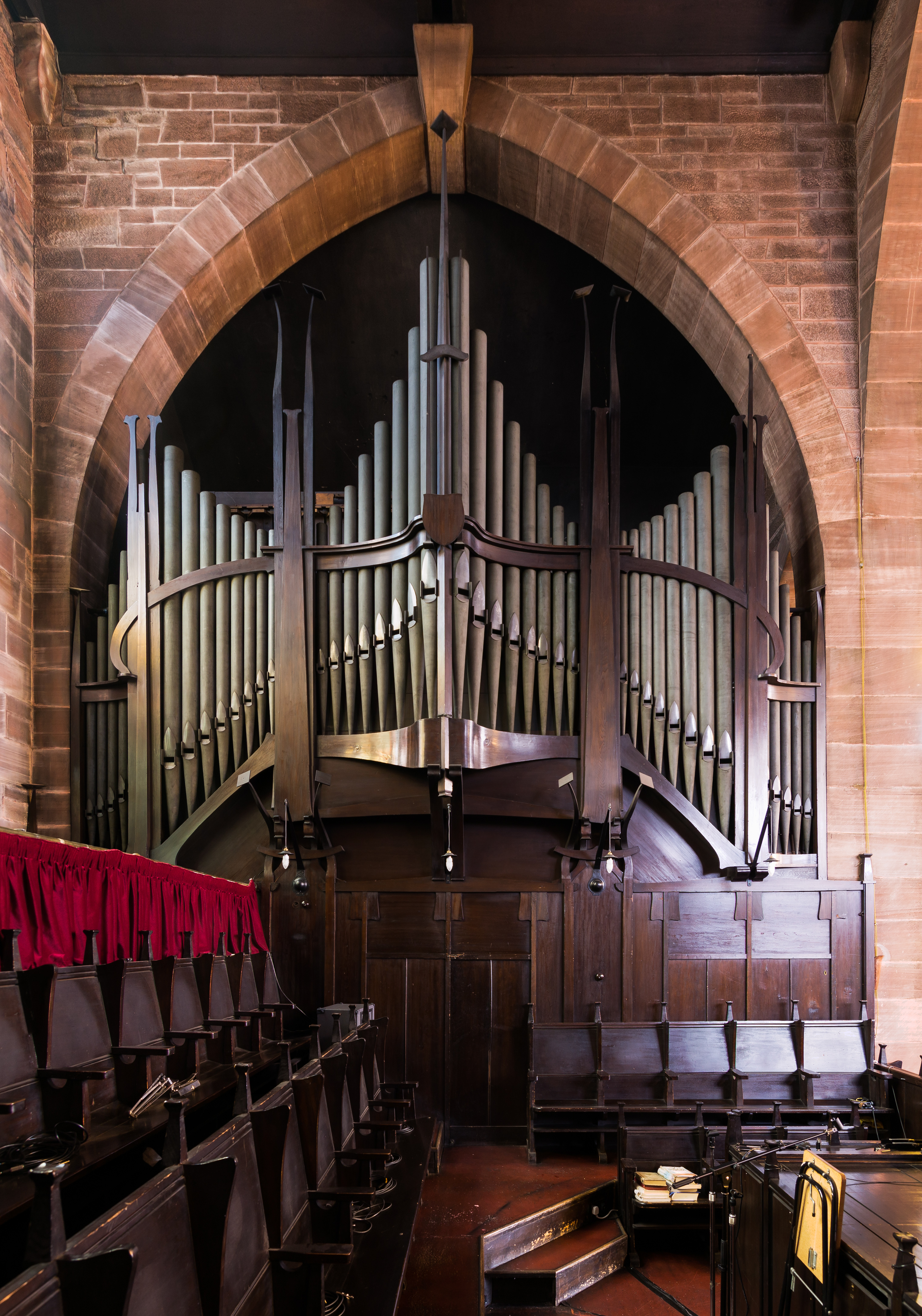
Organ

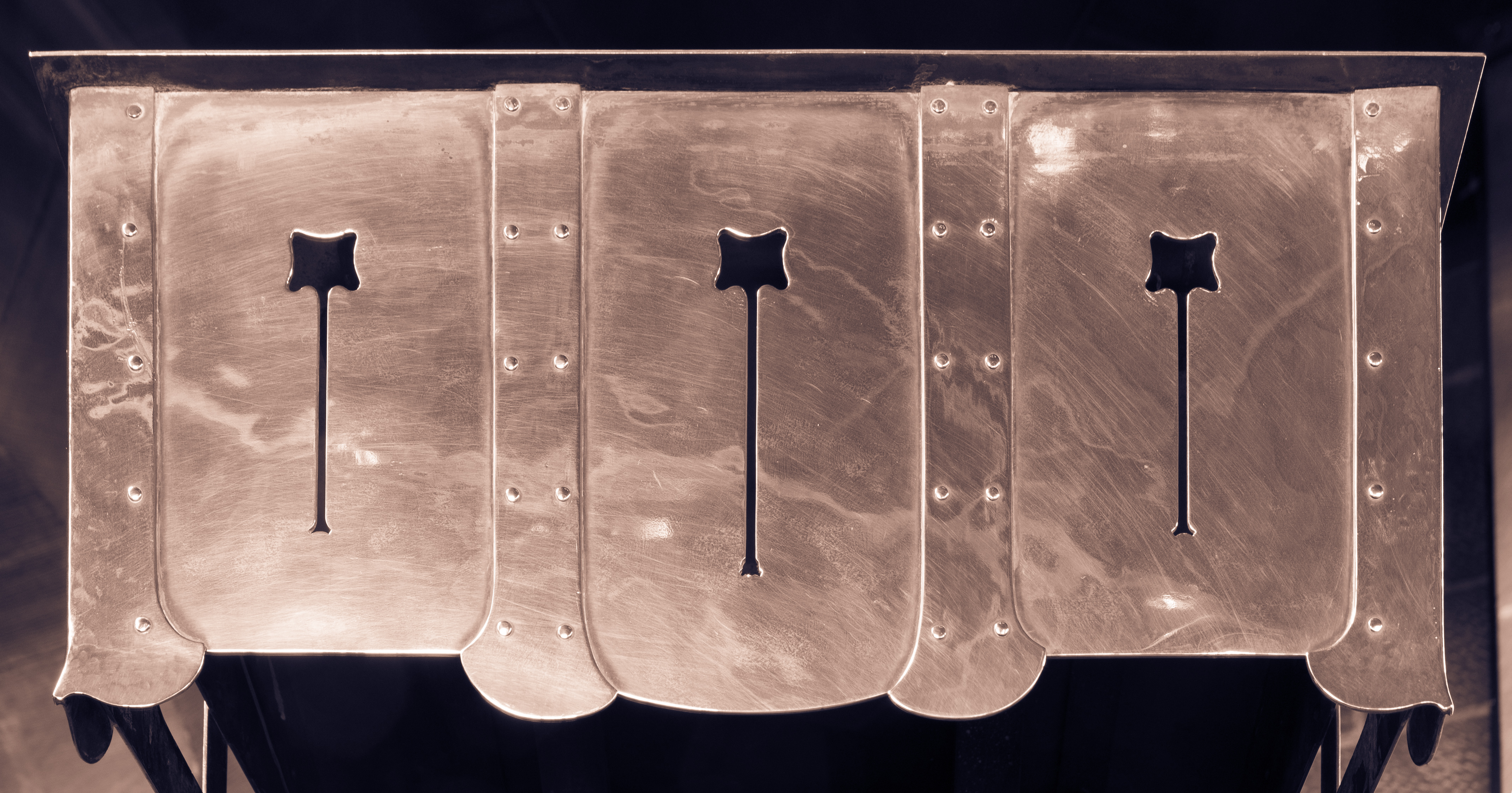
Tulip motif on brass pulpit

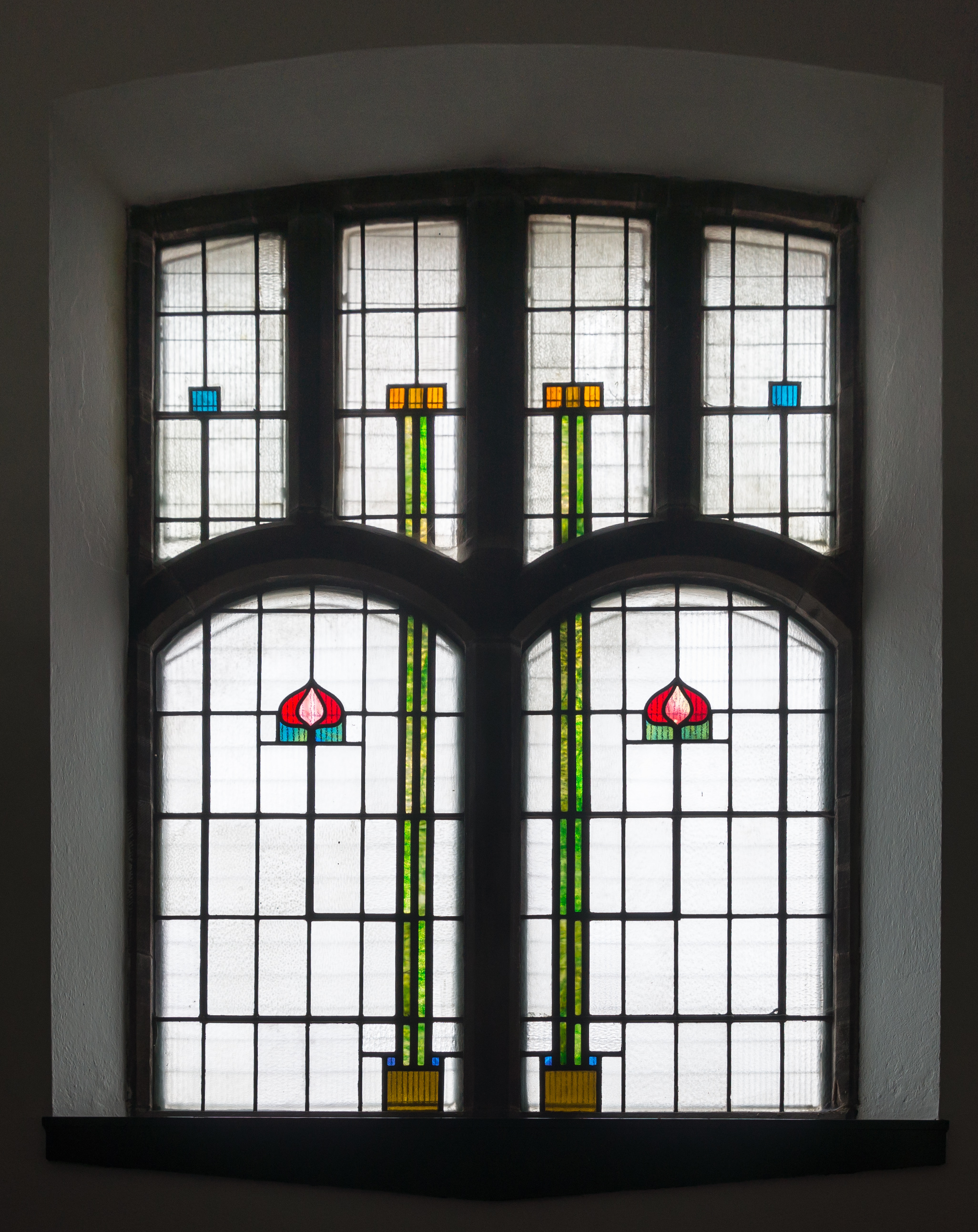
Side Window

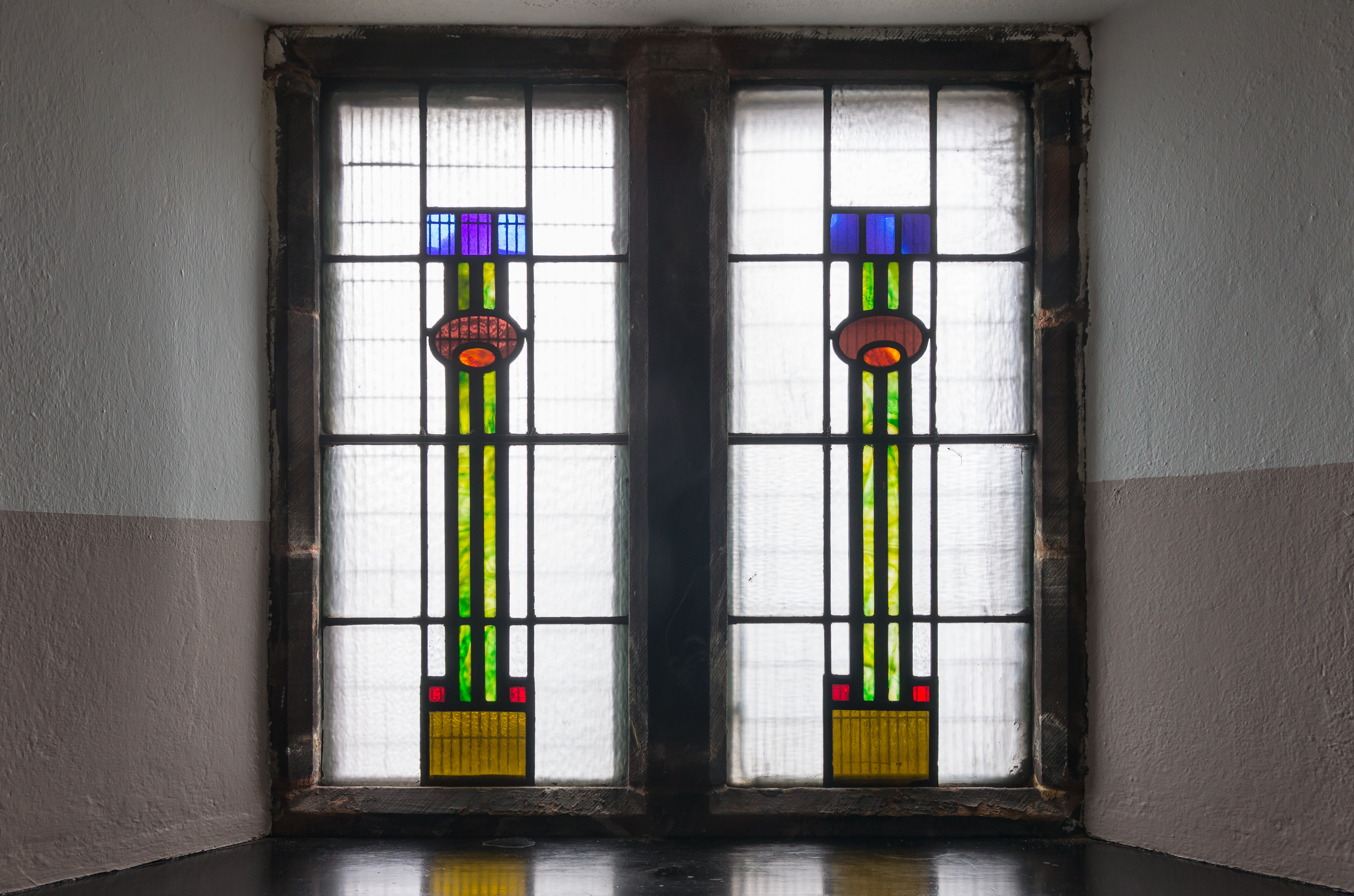
Side Window

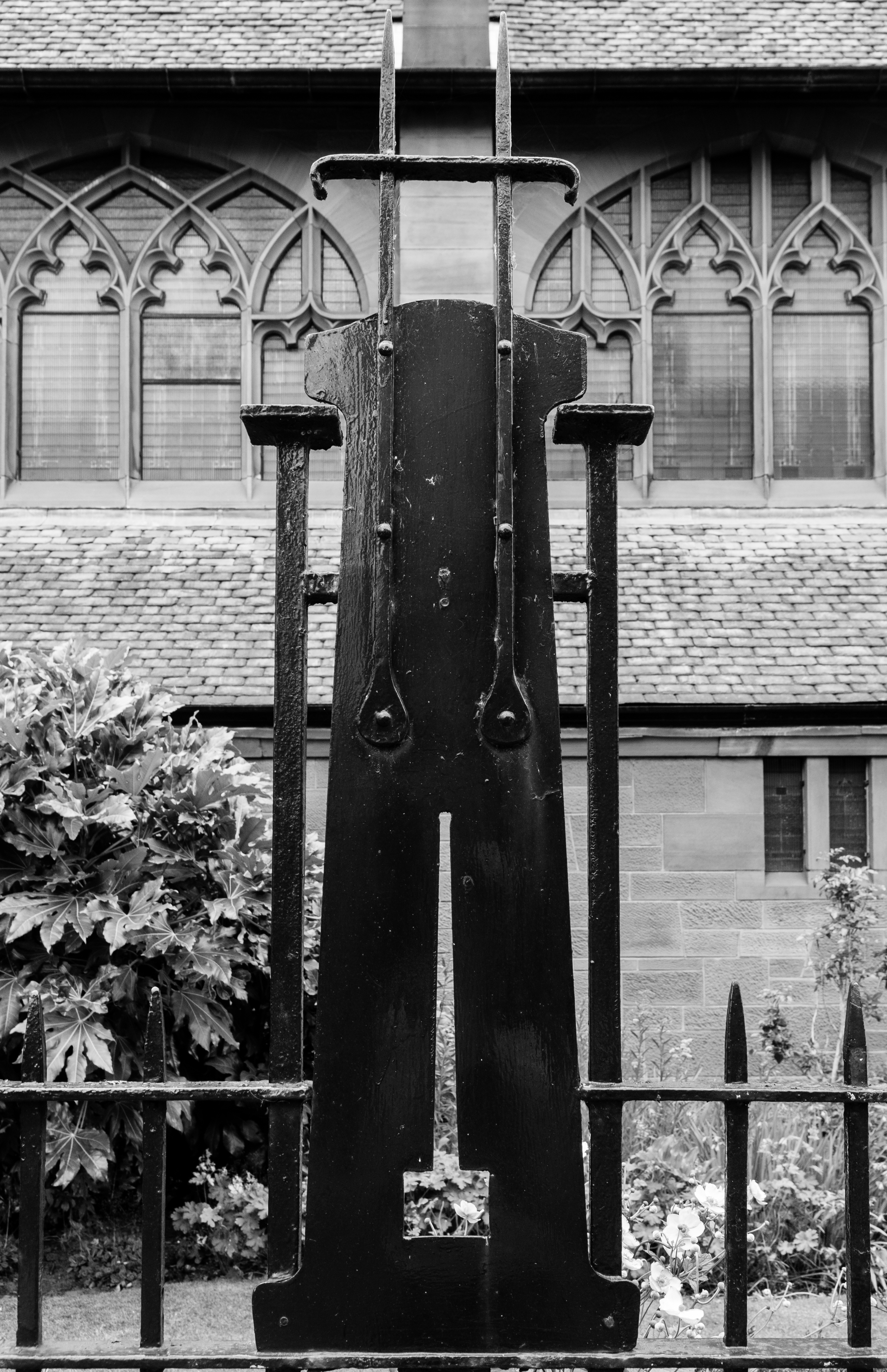
Railings

== See also ==
- List of Category A listed buildings in Renfrewshire
- List of listed buildings in Paisley, Renfrewshire
