= Paisley Town Hall =

Municipal building in Paisley, Scotland

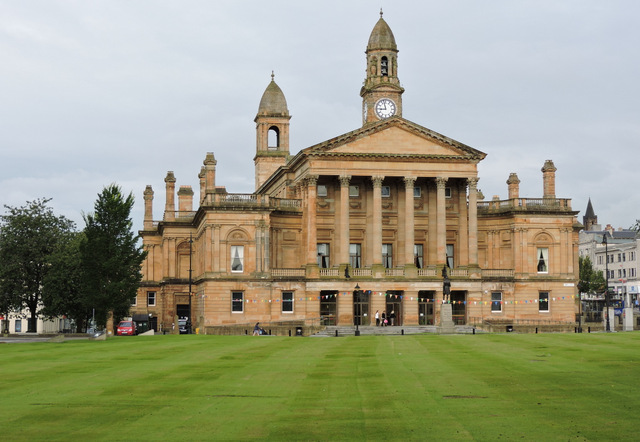
- Paisley Town Hall

- Shown in Renfrewshire
- 55.8452°N 4.4219°W
- Location: Paisley

History
- Built: 1882

Site notes
- Architect(s): William Henry Lynn and William Young
- Architectural style: Classical style

Listed Building – Category A
- Designated: 27 June 1980
- Reference no.: LB38978

Paisley Town Hall is a public hall in Abbey Close, Paisley, Renfrewshire, Scotland. The building, which is being converted into a centre for performing arts, is a Category A listed building.

== History ==
In the mid-19th century the administrative centre of the town was the old tolbooth at the junction of High Street and Moss Street which was built in 1491, rebuilt in 1610, rebuilt again in 1757 and then demolished in 1821. The administrative centre then moved to the municipal buildings, which contained council chambers and offices, further to the east along the High Street. (Note: Paisley Burgh Council moved from the municipal buildings to Paisley Civic Centre (currently known as "Renfrewshire House") in 1971.) However, civic leaders needed a public hall in which to hold concerts and other public events and George Aitken Clark, one of the members of the Clark family, owners of the Anchor Mills, left money in his will for this purpose. The site they selected, just to the south of the municipal buildings, had previously been occupied by a dye works.

The foundation stone for the town hall was laid by Mrs Clarke, the benefactor's mother, on 22 October 1879. It was designed by William Henry Lynn and William Young in the Classical style, built by Messrs Morrison and Mason of Glasgow at a cost of £50,000 and officially opened as the "George A. Clark Town Hall" on 30 January 1882. The design involved a symmetrical main frontage with nine bays facing Abbey Close; the central section of five bays featured three glass doorways on the ground floor; there was a huge hexastyle portico with Corinthian order columns on the first floor with a pediment above. There were also curved wings which swept behind the portico and finished in the end bays. The north elevation featured two towers, the taller of which contained a clock designed and manufactured by Gillett and Bland. A grand organ, made by Bryceson Bros and Ellis, was installed in the main hall and a statue by John Mossman of George Aitken Clark was erected in Abbey Close, in front of the town hall, in 1885.

The chiming mechanism for the bells, which had ceased to function, was repaired in 1988. In February 2019 proposals were announced to convert the town hall into a centre for performing arts. The works, which were to be carried out by Kier Group at a cost of £22 million, commenced in summer 2019.

== See also ==
- List of Category A listed buildings in Renfrewshire
- List of listed buildings in Paisley, Renfrewshire
- List of city chambers and town halls in Scotland
