= List of listed buildings in Kilbarchan, Renfrewshire =

This is a list of listed buildings in the parish of Kilbarchan in Renfrewshire, Scotland.

== List ==
Name	Location	Date Listed	Grid Ref. (Note: Sometimes known as OSGB36, the grid reference (where provided) is based on the British national grid reference system used by the Ordnance Survey. • "Guide to National Grid". Ordnance Survey. • "Get-a-map". Ordnance Survey.)	Geo-coordinates	Notes	LB Number (Note: Historic Environment Scotland assign a unique alphanumeric identifier to each designated site in Scotland, for listed buildings this always begins with "LB", for example "LB12345".)	Image
Bridge Of Weir, Clevans Road, Inchgarvie House				55°51′14″N 4°35′17″W	Category B	13051	Upload Photo
Bridge Of Weir, 12 And 12A Kilbarchan Road, Rockcliffe And Rockcliffe East				55°51′11″N 4°34′17″W	Category B	12958	Upload Photo
15 (Formerly 15, 17) Low Barholm, Kilbarchan				55°50′01″N 4°32′42″W	Category B	12829	Upload Photo
31 Low Barholm, Kilbarchan				55°50′00″N 4°32′37″W	Category C(S)	12832	Upload Photo
Cartside Terrace, Waterside, By Johnstone				55°49′48″N 4°32′05″W	Category B	12835	Upload Photo
21-25 Steeple Street, Kilbarchan				55°50′10″N 4°33′08″W	Category C(S)	12840	Upload Photo
"Greenways" Clevans Road And Donaldfield Road, Bridge Of Weir				55°51′13″N 4°35′21″W	Category C(S)	12769	Upload Photo
15, 17 Church Street, Kilbarchan				55°50′08″N 4°33′14″W	Category C(S)	12785	Upload Photo
9 Shuttle Street Yardshead Kilbarchan				55°50′12″N 4°33′15″W	Category B	12793	Upload Photo
"Forehouse" Locher Road, Kilbarchan				55°50′20″N 4°33′34″W	Category B	12797	Upload another image
Bridge Of Weir, Castle Terrace And 1-3 (Odd Nos) Prieston Road				55°51′15″N 4°34′21″W	Category B	12959	Upload another image
11-20 (All Numbers) Gateside Kilbarchan				55°50′13″N 4°32′57″W	Category B	12801	Upload Photo
10 The Cross, (Formerly "The Masons Arms") Kilbarchan				55°50′10″N 4°33′13″W	Category B	12806	Upload Photo
5 Low Barholm, Kilbarchan				55°50′02″N 4°32′45″W	Category B	12825	Upload Photo
19, 21 Low Barholm, Kilbarchan				55°50′01″N 4°32′41″W	Category B	12830	Upload Photo
Waterstone Farm, Bridge Of Weir Road, By Brookfield				55°50′44″N 4°32′51″W	Category C(S)	12834	Upload Photo
1-6 Gryffe Place Main Street Bridge Of Weir				55°51′28″N 4°34′49″W	Category B	12760	Upload Photo
23 Church Street, Kilbarchan				55°50′08″N 4°33′14″W	Category C(S)	12786	Upload Photo
1-8 Gateside, Kilbarchan				55°50′15″N 4°32′58″W	Category B	12799	Upload Photo
14 Low Barholm, Kilbarchan				55°50′01″N 4°32′42″W	Category C(S)	12819	Upload Photo
27 Low Barholm, Kilbarchan				55°50′00″N 4°32′38″W	Category C(S)	12831	Upload Photo
Clippens House, Clippens Road, By Linwood				55°51′05″N 4°30′19″W	Category B	12833	Upload Photo
Kilbarchan Village Weaving Shop New Street Kilbarchan				55°50′12″N 4°33′08″W	Category B	12740	Upload Photo
Weaving Shop (Now A Dwelling) Behind 37 Low Barholm Kilbarchan				55°50′00″N 4°32′35″W	Category B	12742	Upload Photo
Torr Hall				55°51′39″N 4°36′22″W	Category B	12745	Upload another image See more images
"Homestead", Golf Course Road Bridge Of Weir				55°51′20″N 4°35′19″W	Category C(S)	12762	Upload Photo
Lintwhite School Lintwhite Crescent				55°51′21″N 4°34′28″W	Category B	12773	Upload Photo
Manswrae Farm Kilbarchan Road By Bridge Of Weir				55°51′00″N 4°33′51″W	Category B	12777	Upload Photo
11, (Formerly 9 And 11,) 13 Church Street Kilbarchan				55°50′09″N 4°33′14″W	Category C(S)	12784	Upload Photo
Allan Memorial Fountain Church Street, Kilbarchan				55°50′06″N 4°33′19″W	Category C(S)	12789	Upload Photo
Well Cottage, Shuttle Street, Kilbarchan				55°50′17″N 4°33′24″W	Category C(S)	12794	Upload Photo
30 New Street, Kilbarchan				55°50′16″N 4°33′01″W	Category B	12798	Upload Photo
Bridge Of Weir, Kilbarchan Road, St Machar's Ranfurly Church (Church Of Scotland) With Lychgate And Boundary Walls				55°51′14″N 4°34′15″W	Category B	49075	Upload Photo
26 High Barholm, (Little Acre Forge)				55°50′02″N 4°32′51″W	Category B	12809	Upload Photo
"Beltrees Cottage", High Barholm, Kilbarchan				55°50′02″N 4°33′00″W	Category C(S)	12810	Upload Photo
30 High Barholm, Kilbarchan				55°50′02″N 4°32′51″W	Category C(S)	12813	Upload Photo
34 High Barholm, Kilbarchan				55°50′02″N 4°32′49″W	Category C(S)	12815	Upload Photo
36 High Barholm, Kilbarchan				55°50′02″N 4°32′49″W	Category C(S)	12816	Upload Photo
Weaving Shop Between 16 Steeple Street And The Old Manse Kilbarchan				55°50′10″N 4°33′11″W	Category C(S)	12744	Upload Photo
Gryffe Inn, Main Street, Bridge Of Weir				55°51′29″N 4°34′47″W	Category C(S)	12757	Upload Photo
"Dundarroch" Golf Course Road Bridge Of Weir				55°51′19″N 4°35′17″W	Category B	12761	Upload Photo
"Brannochlie", Prieston Road, Bridge Of Weir				55°51′15″N 4°34′50″W	Category B	12771	Upload Photo
Ranfurly Church Of Scotland Ranfurly Place Bridge Of Weir				55°51′14″N 4°34′50″W	Category B	12774	Upload Photo
Barnbeth House By Bridge Of Weir (With Gates, Garden Walls And Ancillary Buildings)				55°50′58″N 4°36′44″W	Category B	12776	Upload Photo
35 Low Barholm, Kilbarchan				55°50′00″N 4°32′36″W	Category C(S)	12781	Upload Photo
41 Low Barholm, Kilbarchan				55°49′59″N 4°32′34″W	Category C(S)	12783	Upload Photo
"Woodside" Merchant's Close, Kilbarchan				55°50′09″N 4°33′20″W	Category C(S)	12791	Upload Photo
29 Church Street, Kilbarchan				55°50′07″N 4°33′16″W	Category C(S)	13843	Upload Photo
Kilbarchan Old Parish Church Of Scotland, Church Street				55°50′09″N 4°33′17″W	Category B	13468	Upload Photo
Glentyan House, By Kilbarchan				55°50′06″N 4°33′38″W	Category B	12804	Upload Photo
Wardhouse Forehouse Road Glentyan By Kilbarchan				55°50′08″N 4°33′59″W	Category B	12805	Upload Photo
29 High Barholm, Kilbarchan				55°50′03″N 4°32′51″W	Category B	12811	Upload Photo
31 High Barholm, Kilbarchan				55°50′03″N 4°32′50″W	Category B	12812	Upload Photo
6 Low Barholm, Kilbarchan				55°50′01″N 4°32′45″W	Category B	12817	Upload Photo
18 Low Barholm, Kilbarchan				55°50′00″N 4°32′40″W	Category C(S)	12820	Upload Photo
7 And 7A Low Barholm, Kilbarchan				55°50′02″N 4°32′45″W	Category B	12826	Upload Photo
13 Low Barholm, Kilbarchan				55°50′01″N 4°32′42″W	Category B	12828	Upload Photo
"Threeplands" Golf Course Road Bridge Of Weir				55°51′23″N 4°35′36″W	Category C(S)	12768	Upload Photo
"The Cairn", Prieston Road, Bridge Of Weir				55°51′16″N 4°34′56″W	Category B	12770	Upload Photo
Bridge Of Weir, Ranfurly Castle Golf Clubhouse				55°51′16″N 4°35′14″W	Category B	12779	Upload Photo
39 Low Barholm, Kilbarchan				55°50′00″N 4°32′34″W	Category C(S)	12782	Upload Photo
5 Shuttle Street, Kilbarchan				55°50′11″N 4°33′15″W	Category B	12792	Upload Photo
April Cottage 23 Shuttle Street Kilbarchan				55°50′13″N 4°33′18″W	Category C(S)	12795	Upload Photo
16 Low Barholm, Kilbarchan				55°50′00″N 4°32′41″W	Category C(S)	13844	Upload Photo
Auchensale Ridge Over Locher Water At Harelaw Farm Road-End				55°50′28″N 4°35′26″W	Category C(S)	13050	Upload Photo
9-10 Gateside, Kilbarchan				55°50′13″N 4°32′56″W	Category B	12800	Upload Photo
"The White House" Milliken				55°50′31″N 4°31′47″W	Category B	12802	Upload Photo
1, 3 Low Barholm, Kilbarchan				55°50′02″N 4°32′45″W	Category B	12824	Upload Photo
"Tower House", Milliken Park Road, Kilbarchan				55°49′45″N 4°32′16″W	Category C(S)	12838	Upload Photo
Kilbarchan Steeple And Steeple Buildings, Steeple Square, Kilbarchan				55°50′10″N 4°33′06″W	Category A	12839	Upload another image
2, 4 Ewing Street, Kilbarchan				55°50′09″N 4°33′05″W	Category B	12841	Upload Photo
East Parish Church, Steeple Square, Kilbarchan				55°50′12″N 4°33′04″W	Category B	12842	Upload Photo
"Kincraig" Golf Course Road Bridge Of Weir				55°51′22″N 4°35′32″W	Category C(S)	12765	Upload Photo
Auchenames Farm Kebbleston Road By Kilbarchan				55°49′44″N 4°33′47″W	Category B	12778	Upload Photo
25 Church Street, Kilbarchan				55°50′07″N 4°33′15″W	Category C(S)	12787	Upload Photo
27 Church Street, Kilbarchan				55°50′07″N 4°33′15″W	Category C(S)	12788	Upload Photo
"The Cottage" (Formerly "Brookfield Cottage"), Shuttle Street/Locher Road				55°50′15″N 4°33′24″W	Category C(S)	12796	Upload Photo
Garthland Bridge Over Black Cart Water; By Howwood				55°48′45″N 4°33′48″W	Category A	13842	Upload Photo
29 Low Barholm, Kilbarchan				55°50′01″N 4°32′37″W	Category C(S)	13845	Upload Photo
6 Steeple Street, Kilbarchan				55°50′10″N 4°33′12″W	Category B	12807	Upload Photo
8 And 10 Steeple Street, (Formerly 'The Black Bull'), Kilbarchan				55°50′10″N 4°33′12″W	Category B	12808	Upload Photo
24 Low Barholm, Kilbarchan				55°50′00″N 4°32′39″W	Category C(S)	12823	Upload Photo
Glencart House, Milliken Park Road, Kilbarchan				55°49′38″N 4°32′07″W	Category B	12836	Upload Photo
Weaver's Cottage, The Cross, Kilbarchan				55°50′10″N 4°33′14″W	Category A	12843	Upload another image See more images
St Bryde's House St Bryde's Road By Howwood				55°48′49″N 4°34′48″W	Category C(S)	12737	Upload Photo
Bryde's Mill At St Bryde's				55°48′50″N 4°34′52″W	Category B	12738	Upload Photo
'Temple' On Kenmuir Hill By Castle Semple				55°48′36″N 4°34′42″W	Category B	12739	Upload Photo
Weaving Shop Behind 3 Steeple Square Kilbarchan				55°50′11″N 4°33′06″W	Category C(S)	12741	Upload Photo
Weaving Shop Behind 16 Ewing Street Kilbarchan				55°50′07″N 4°33′03″W	Category C(S)	12743	Upload Photo
"Hermiston" Golf Course Road Bridge Of Weir				55°51′21″N 4°35′25″W	Category B	12763	Upload Photo
"Greendykes" Golf Course Road Bridge Of Weir				55°51′22″N 4°35′30″W	Category C(S)	12764	Upload Photo
Bridge Of Weir, Hazelwood Road, Beauly, Including Boundary Walls And Gatepiers				55°51′03″N 4°34′35″W	Category B	12772	Upload Photo
"Easterhill" Bankend Road Northview Road Bridge Of Weir				55°51′05″N 4°33′49″W	Category B	12775	Upload Photo
Former Parish Church, (Now Hall Of West Parish Church) Kilbarchan (Including Surrounding Churchyard)				55°50′08″N 4°33′17″W	Category B	12790	Upload Photo
Bridge Of Weir Freeland Church				55°51′24″N 4°34′39″W	Category C(S)	13481	Upload another image
Tower, Milliken				55°50′20″N 4°31′36″W	Category C(S)	12803	Upload Photo
32 High Barholm, Kilbarchan				55°50′02″N 4°32′50″W	Category C(S)	12814	Upload Photo
12 Low Barholm, Kilbarchan				55°50′01″N 4°32′42″W	Category B	12818	Upload Photo
20 Low Barholm, Kilbarchan				55°50′00″N 4°32′40″W	Category C(S)	12821	Upload Photo
22 Low Barholm, Kilbarchan				55°50′00″N 4°32′39″W	Category C(S)	12822	Upload Photo
11 Low Barholm, Kilbarchan				55°50′01″N 4°32′43″W	Category B	12827	Upload Photo
"The Elms" Milliken Park Road, Kilbarchan				55°49′44″N 4°32′13″W	Category C(S)	12837	Upload Photo
14 Steeple Street, Kilbarchan Old Manse				55°50′09″N 4°33′11″W	Category B	12890	Upload Photo
Bridge Of Weir, Main Street, 1 Morrison Place				55°51′28″N 4°34′47″W	Category B	12758	Upload Photo
"Millwheel" Main Street Bridge Of Weir				55°51′27″N 4°34′47″W	Category C(S)	12759	Upload Photo
33 Low Barholm, Kilbarchan				55°50′00″N 4°32′36″W	Category C(S)	12780	Upload Photo

== Key ==
The scheme for classifying buildings in Scotland is:

- Category A: "buildings of national or international importance, either architectural or historic; or fine, little-altered examples of some particular period, style or building type."
- Category B: "buildings of regional or more than local importance; or major examples of some particular period, style or building type, which may have been altered."
- Category C: "buildings of local importance; lesser examples of any period, style, or building type, as originally constructed or moderately altered; and simple traditional buildings which group well with other listed buildings."

In March 2016 there were 47,288 listed buildings in Scotland. Of these, 8% were Category A, and 50% were Category B, with the remaining 42% being Category C.
