= List of listed buildings in Houston, Renfrewshire =

This is a list of listed buildings in the parish of Houston in Renfrewshire, Scotland.

== List ==
Name	Location	Date Listed	Grid Ref. (Note: Sometimes known as OSGB36, the grid reference (where provided) is based on the British national grid reference system used by the Ordnance Survey. • "Guide to National Grid". Ordnance Survey. • "Get-a-map". Ordnance Survey.)	Geo-coordinates	Notes	LB Number (Note: Historic Environment Scotland assign a unique alphanumeric identifier to each designated site in Scotland, for listed buildings this always begins with "LB", for example "LB12345".)	Image
Houston Village Houston & Kilellan Parish Church, Kirk Road, Houston Village				55°52′14″N 4°32′34″W	Category B	12694	Upload another image See more images
Two Monuments Within Houston And Kilellan Church				55°52′14″N 4°32′34″W	Category A	12695	Upload Photo
"Barrfield" Main Street				55°52′05″N 4°33′00″W	Category B	12687	Upload Photo
Bridge Of Weir Viaduct				55°51′30″N 4°34′55″W	Category B	12688	Upload Photo
Fullwood Bridge, River Gryfe, Linwood Road				55°52′10″N 4°29′43″W	Category B	12689	Upload Photo
Houston Cottage And Ancillary Buildings North Street				55°52′15″N 4°32′48″W	Category B	13836	Upload Photo
Houston House Houston				55°52′17″N 4°32′26″W	Category B	12693	Upload Photo
Houston Village, South Street, Mercat Cross				55°52′08″N 4°33′00″W	Category B	12697	Upload another image
"Lamorna", South Street, Houston Village				55°52′07″N 4°33′06″W	Category B	12680	Upload Photo
Fox & Hounds Inn, South Street & Redholm Main Street, Houston Village				55°52′09″N 4°33′01″W	Category B	12681	Upload Photo
St. Fillan's R.C. Church And Attached Presbytery And Former School, Fourwindings, Houston				55°51′59″N 4°32′56″W	Category B	12682	Upload Photo
"Rowantree" South Street				55°52′07″N 4°33′05″W	Category C(S)	12685	Upload Photo
Ardgryfe House, Off Houston Road				55°52′00″N 4°31′16″W	Category B	12690	Upload Photo
Cotswold And Kersland, South Street				55°52′08″N 4°33′07″W	Category B	12698	Upload Photo
"Shoreston" South Street				55°52′07″N 4°33′04″W	Category C(S)	12686	Upload Photo
St. Peter's Well, By Greenhill Farm Houston				55°52′27″N 4°32′48″W	Category B	12696	Upload Photo
"Kilmory" South St				55°52′07″N 4°33′07″W	Category B	12699	Upload Photo
Ardgryfe House Lodge Off Houston Road				55°52′00″N 4°31′20″W	Category C(S)	12691	Upload Photo
Main Street, Houston Primary School				55°51′50″N 4°32′38″W	Category B	9867	Upload Photo
"Woodend", Houston Road				55°52′03″N 4°32′12″W	Category B	12692	Upload Photo
Kilellan Old Manse (Now Known As "Killellan") By Kirkton Farm, Killellan Road				55°53′10″N 4°35′16″W	Category B	12683	Upload Photo
Cochrane's Place Nw Corner Of South Street And Main Street, Houston Village				55°52′09″N 4°33′03″W	Category C(S)	13837	Upload Photo
Gryffe Castle (Now Children's Home), Kilmacolm Road, Bridge Of Weir				55°51′46″N 4°34′57″W	Category B	12684	Upload Photo

== Key ==
The scheme for classifying buildings in Scotland is:

- Category A: "buildings of national or international importance, either architectural or historic; or fine, little-altered examples of some particular period, style or building type."
- Category B: "buildings of regional or more than local importance; or major examples of some particular period, style or building type, which may have been altered."
- Category C: "buildings of local importance; lesser examples of any period, style, or building type, as originally constructed or moderately altered; and simple traditional buildings which group well with other listed buildings."

In March 2016 there were 47,288 listed buildings in Scotland. Of these, 8% were Category A, and 50% were Category B, with the remaining 42% being Category C.
