= List of listed buildings in Johnstone, Renfrewshire =

This is a list of listed buildings in the parish of Johnstone in Renfrewshire, Scotland.

== List ==
Name	Location	Date Listed	Grid Ref. (Note: Sometimes known as OSGB36, the grid reference (where provided) is based on the British national grid reference system used by the Ordnance Survey. • "Guide to National Grid". Ordnance Survey. • "Get-a-map". Ordnance Survey.)	Geo-coordinates	Notes	LB Number (Note: Historic Environment Scotland assign a unique alphanumeric identifier to each designated site in Scotland, for listed buildings this always begins with "LB", for example "LB12345".)	Image
Tower At Rear Of Red House, Cochranemill Road				55°49′17″N 4°31′36″W	Category C(S)	35603	Upload Photo
62 High Street				55°50′14″N 4°30′49″W	Category C(S)	35605	Upload Photo
Moorburn, Old Auchengreoch Road, Johnstone, With Summerhouse, Boundary Walls, Gatepiers And Gates				55°49′07″N 4°31′29″W	Category B	35622	Upload Photo
Park Road, Laigh Park Including Ancillary Structure, Boundary Walls, Gatepiers And Gates				55°49′55″N 4°30′38″W	Category C(S)	48033	Upload Photo
Park Road, The Grange Including Boundary Walls, Gatepiers And Gates				55°49′49″N 4°30′52″W	Category C(S)	48614	Upload Photo
Quarry Street, High Parish Church. (Including Graveyard, Etc.)				55°50′03″N 4°30′53″W	Category B	35612	Upload another image See more images
Thorn Inn, Thornhill,				55°50′02″N 4°29′54″W	Category C(S)	35613	Upload Photo
Former Police Station, 9 Collier Street, Johnstone				55°50′15″N 4°30′47″W	Category C(S)	35617	Upload Photo
Johnstone Castle, Off Beith Road				55°49′40″N 4°30′27″W	Category B	35602	Upload Photo
St. John The Evangelists' Episcopal Church, Floors Street				55°49′59″N 4°31′00″W	Category B	35604	Upload Photo
67 High Street				55°50′13″N 4°30′51″W	Category C(S)	35621	Upload Photo
64 High Street				55°50′14″N 4°30′50″W	Category C(S)	35606	Upload Photo
68 High Street				55°50′14″N 4°30′51″W	Category C(S)	35608	Upload Photo
Houston Square, Bandstand				55°50′11″N 4°30′44″W	Category B	35615	Upload another image
Houston Saint Johnstone, Masonic Lodge 11 Collier Street, Dwarf Walls And Gatepiers				55°50′16″N 4°30′48″W	Category B	35618	Upload another image
63 High Street				55°50′13″N 4°30′50″W	Category C(S)	35619	Upload Photo
65 High Street				55°50′13″N 4°30′50″W	Category C(S)	35620	Upload Photo
66 High Street				55°50′14″N 4°30′51″W	Category C(S)	35607	Upload Photo
Former Burgh Chambers, 7 Collier Street, Johnstone				55°50′14″N 4°30′47″W	Category B	35616	Upload Photo
New Globe Bingo And Social Club (Former Globe Cinema) 7 And 9 High Street				55°50′09″N 4°30′28″W	Category C(S)	51168	Upload Photo
70 High Street				55°50′14″N 4°30′52″W	Category C(S)	35609	Upload Photo

== Key ==
The scheme for classifying buildings in Scotland is:

- Category A: "buildings of national or international importance, either architectural or historic; or fine, little-altered examples of some particular period, style or building type."
- Category B: "buildings of regional or more than local importance; or major examples of some particular period, style or building type, which may have been altered."
- Category C: "buildings of local importance; lesser examples of any period, style, or building type, as originally constructed or moderately altered; and simple traditional buildings which group well with other listed buildings."

In March 2016 there were 47,288 listed buildings in Scotland. Of these, 8% were Category A, and 50% were Category B, with the remaining 42% being Category C.
