= List of listed buildings in Paisley, Renfrewshire =

This is a list of listed buildings in the parish of Paisley in Renfrewshire, Scotland.

== List ==
Name	Location	Date listed	Grid ref. (Note: Sometimes known as OSGB36, the grid reference (where provided) is based on the British national grid reference system used by the Ordnance Survey. • "Guide to National Grid". Ordnance Survey. • "Get-a-map". Ordnance Survey.)	Geo-coordinates	Notes	LB number (Note: Historic Environment Scotland assign a unique alphanumeric identifier to each designated site in Scotland, for listed buildings this always begins with "LB", for example "LB12345".)	Image
Broomlands Street, Woodside Cemetery, Martyr's Monument (1 Of 2)				55°50′37″N 4°26′33″W	Category B	43485	Upload Photo
New Street, Paisley Arts Centre (Former Low Church)				55°50′38″N 4°25′28″W	Category B	39059	Upload another image See more images
12 New Street				55°50′40″N 4°25′35″W	Category B	39061	Upload another image
51-55 Oakshaw Street				55°50′44″N 4°25′52″W	Category C(S)	39073	Upload Photo
57 Oakshaw Street				55°50′44″N 4°25′54″W	Category B	39074	Upload Photo
6 Oakshaw Street Moran's Auction Rooms (Former Oakshaw East U.F. Church)				55°50′46″N 4°25′36″W	Category B	39075	Upload Photo
20 Oakshaw Street, Former Gaelic Church				55°50′47″N 4°25′44″W	Category B	39082	Upload Photo
62, 64 Oakshaw Street Former Cameronian Church				55°50′44″N 4°25′59″W	Category C(S)	39088	Upload Photo
66, 68 Oakshaw Street Former Manse				55°50′44″N 4°25′59″W	Category C(S)	39089	Upload Photo
Orr Square Church Of Scotland				55°50′44″N 4°25′47″W	Category B	39093	Upload Photo
86, 88 Renfrew Road				55°51′14″N 4°24′58″W	Category B	39096	Upload Photo
94 Renfrew Road				55°51′17″N 4°24′57″W	Category B	39099	Upload Photo
6 St Mirren Street				55°50′42″N 4°25′25″W	Category B	39107	Upload Photo
14 Shuttle Street				55°50′35″N 4°25′32″W	Category C(S)	39113	Upload Photo
Stanely Road, Moredun Lodge				55°49′51″N 4°26′13″W	Category B	39120	Upload Photo
Glasgow Road, Paisley Grammar School Including Boundary Walls And Gatepiers Including Janitor's Lodge				55°50′47″N 4°24′41″W	Category B	39129	Upload another image See more images
70-116 (Even Nos) And 55-101 (Odd Nos) Falside Road, Workmen's Cottages				55°49′46″N 4°25′48″W	Category B	39137	Upload Photo
West End Cross, 2 Broomlands Street				55°50′39″N 4°26′15″W	Category B	39138	Upload Photo
11 Gauze Street Arnott's				55°50′45″N 4°25′15″W	Category B	38981	Upload another image
10, 12 George Street				55°50′34″N 4°25′31″W	Category B	38990	Upload Photo
42 George Street, Paisley Technical College				55°50′35″N 4°25′50″W	Category B	38992	Upload Photo
7 Gilmour Street "Clydesdale Bank"				55°50′46″N 4°25′26″W	Category A	38994	Upload Photo
9 Gilmour Street				55°50′46″N 4°25′26″W	Category B	38995	Upload Photo
3-19 (Odd) Glasgow Road, Garthland Place				55°50′50″N 4°24′54″W	Category B	38998	Upload Photo
Gordon Street, Former Fire Station				55°50′32″N 4°25′22″W	Category B	39006	Upload Photo
Gordon Street / Johnston Street, St Matthew's Church Including Railings				55°50′33″N 4°25′19″W	Category A	39007	Upload another image
Hawkhead Road, Hawkhead Hospital, Administration Block, Former Nurses Home, Wards 1-5, Boiler House And Mortuary, Laundry Block, Porter's Lodge, Waiting Room And Cottages				55°50′02″N 4°23′32″W	Category B	39010	Upload Photo
23 High Street, The Paisley Centre				55°50′43″N 4°25′31″W	Category B	39014	Upload another image
28 High Street				55°50′43″N 4°25′35″W	Category B	39022	Upload another image
26 Hunterhill Road And Gate Piers				55°50′13″N 4°24′55″W	Category B	39028	Upload Photo
46, 48 Love Street				55°51′02″N 4°25′34″W	Category C(S)	39040	Upload Photo
53 Moss Street				55°50′52″N 4°25′35″W	Category B	39053	Upload Photo
Neilston Road St Luke's Church				55°50′15″N 4°25′30″W	Category C(S)	39056	Upload Photo
Abbey Close "Alexander Wilson"				55°50′44″N 4°25′17″W	Category B	38908	Upload another image See more images
Abbey Close, Paisley Abbey				55°50′42″N 4°25′13″W	Category A	38910	Upload another image
Alice Street "Rosebank"				55°50′03″N 4°25′42″W	Category B	38913	Upload Photo
Anchor Mills, Former Domestic Finishing Mill				55°50′31″N 4°25′06″W	Category A	38915	Upload another image See more images
Anchor Mills, Mile End Mill				55°50′34″N 4°24′39″W	Category A	38917	Upload another image See more images
5 Caledonia Street				55°50′56″N 4°25′50″W	Category B	38931	Upload Photo
Fountain At Angle Of Calside And Neilston Road				55°50′19″N 4°25′31″W	Category C(S)	38934	Upload Photo
43 Causeyside Street And 1 Johnston Street				55°50′33″N 4°25′26″W	Category B	38940	Upload Photo
20 Donaldswood Road, Blacklands Lodge And Gatepiers				55°49′32″N 4°26′07″W	Category B	38954	Upload Photo
Dunn Square "Dunn Fountain"				55°50′43″N 4°25′23″W	Category B	38959	Upload Photo
Ne Corner Of Falside Road And Braids Road, Brown And Polson Ltd				55°49′46″N 4°25′36″W	Category B	38963	Upload another image See more images
Former Ferguslie Thread Works, Bridge Lane Gatehouse				55°50′21″N 4°26′43″W	Category B	38964	Upload another image See more images
Former Ferguslie Thread Works, Tannahill's Bridge				55°50′20″N 4°26′34″W	Category C(S)	38968	Upload Photo
5-11 (Odd) Forbes Place				55°50′39″N 4°25′21″W	Category B	38973	Upload Photo
Nos 8, 10, 12 Forbes Place				55°50′38″N 4°25′21″W	Category B	38976	Upload Photo
Gauze Street George A Clark Town Hall				55°50′42″N 4°25′19″W	Category A	38978	Upload another image
Leitchland Farm				55°49′32″N 4°28′53″W	Category C(S)	18829	Upload Photo
Auchenlodment House 136 Auchenlodment Road Elderslie				55°49′36″N 4°29′40″W	Category C(S)	18587	Upload Photo
Incle Street, St Mirin's Roman Catholic Cathedral With Boundary Walls And Piers				55°50′51″N 4°25′00″W	Category B	46284	Upload another image See more images
Thornly Park, 17 South Avenue, Foxburn Including Boundary Walls And Gatepiers				55°49′32″N 4°24′58″W	Category C(S)	48039	Upload Photo
Thornly Park, 19 South Avenue, Arthurlie				55°49′32″N 4°24′56″W	Category C(S)	48040	Upload Photo
Thornly Park, 10 Thornly Park Avenue, Glenarm Including Boundary Walls, Gatepiers And Gates				55°49′33″N 4°25′05″W	Category C(S)	48049	Upload Photo
215 Glasgow Road, Barshaw House				55°50′51″N 4°23′28″W	Category B	44766	Upload another image
22 New Street				55°50′38″N 4°25′32″W	Category C(S)	39064	Upload Photo
10 Oakshaw Street				55°50′47″N 4°25′38″W	Category C(S)	39078	Upload Photo
12, 14 Oakshaw Street				55°50′47″N 4°25′39″W	Category C(S)	39079	Upload Photo
Underwood Road, Railway Viaduct				55°50′54″N 4°25′53″W	Category B	39126	Upload Photo
Park Road, Scotscraig				55°49′53″N 4°26′05″W	Category B	39131	Upload Photo
4, 6 Gilmour Street				55°50′45″N 4°25′25″W	Category B	38996	Upload another image
1 Glasgow Road				55°50′50″N 4°24′58″W	Category C(S)	38997	Upload Photo
83, Glasgow Road Arthur Allison Memorial Hall				55°50′49″N 4°24′18″W	Category C(S)	39000	Upload another image
4 Glen Street				55°50′58″N 4°25′36″W	Category C(S)	39004	Upload Photo
6, High Road, Castlehead				55°50′23″N 4°26′16″W	Category B	39013	Upload Photo
39 High Street And 5 New Street, Ymca				55°50′42″N 4°25′35″W	Category B	39015	Upload Photo
10, 10A And 12 High Street And 2 Moss Street				55°50′44″N 4°25′29″W	Category B	39017	Upload Photo
18 High Street				55°50′43″N 4°25′32″W	Category B	39018	Upload Photo
30 High Street				55°50′43″N 4°25′34″W	Category B	39023	Upload another image
High Street, Coats Memorial Church				55°50′41″N 4°25′57″W	Category A	39027	Upload another image
Inchinnan Road, Landmark Warehouse				55°51′18″N 4°25′37″W	Category B	39029	Upload Photo
Nos 17-25 (Odd) Lady Lane				55°50′36″N 4°25′56″W	Category B	39031	Upload another image See more images
Fountain Gardens Love Street Fountain				55°51′01″N 4°25′44″W	Category A	39035	Upload Photo
42, 44 Love Street				55°51′01″N 4°25′34″W	Category C(S)	39039	Upload Photo
69-83 (Odd) Maxwellton Road				55°50′26″N 4°26′56″W	Category B	39046	Upload Photo
Moredun Road "Crosbie"				55°49′42″N 4°26′50″W	Category A	39049	Upload Photo
1-5 (Odd) Moss Street				55°50′44″N 4°25′28″W	Category B	39050	Upload another image
6 Moss Street/1 The Cross				55°50′45″N 4°25′27″W	Category B	39054	Upload another image
Neilston Road, Royal Alexandra Infirmary				55°50′13″N 4°25′33″W	Category B	39057	Upload another image See more images
1-3 (Odd Nos) Causeyside Street And 21 Forbes Place				55°50′41″N 4°25′22″W	21 Forbes Place, Paisley.jpg	38937	Upload Photo
Church Hill Former Middle Church Hall				55°50′44″N 4°25′38″W	Category C(S)	38949	Upload Photo
1-5 (Odd) County Place, 15 Gilmour Street And 20 Moss Street				55°50′47″N 4°25′27″W	Category B	38951	Upload Photo
Elderslie Kirk (West), 284 Main Road, Elderslie				55°50′09″N 4°29′29″W	Category C(S)	19893	Upload Photo
Ralston Golf Clubhouse, Strathmore Ave., Ralston, Paisley				55°50′40″N 4°22′59″W	Category C(S)	18585	Upload Photo
Caplethill Road, Thorscrag Including Ancillary Structure				55°49′12″N 4°25′15″W	Category B	48036	Upload Photo
Thornly Park, 43 Thornly Park Avenue, Airdoch Including Boundary Walls, Gatepiers And Gates				55°49′39″N 4°24′37″W	Category C(S)	48047	Upload Photo
19 Park Road, Makerston House, Including Outbuilding, Gatepiers And Walls To Street				55°49′51″N 4°25′56″W	Category C(S)	49156	Upload Photo
15 And 17 Marshall's Lane And Cart Walk, Kelvin House				55°50′38″N 4°25′19″W	Category C(S)	50176	Upload Photo
21 Stonefield Avenue, Littlecroft				55°49′42″N 4°25′03″W	Category B	43891	Upload Photo
91, 93 New Sneddon Street "Adelphi House"				55°51′08″N 4°25′29″W	Category B	39066	Upload Photo
19 Oakshaw Street, Paisley High Church Halls				55°50′47″N 4°25′44″W	Category B	39070	Upload another image
35 Oakshaw Street				55°50′46″N 4°25′48″W	Category B	39071	Upload Photo
49 Oakshaw Street, Coats Observatory				55°50′44″N 4°25′52″W	Category A	39072	Upload Photo
6A Oakshaw Street (Former Church Hall)				55°50′46″N 4°25′36″W	Category B	39076	Upload Photo
60 Oakshaw Street				55°50′45″N 4°25′57″W	Category B	39087	Upload Photo
Queen Street Tannahill's Cottage				55°50′35″N 4°26′18″W	Category B	39094	Upload another image
92 Renfrew Road				55°51′16″N 4°24′58″W	Category B	39098	Upload Photo
St James Street Procurator Fiscal's Office				55°50′55″N 4°25′37″W	Category B	39104	Upload Photo
Stanely Road "Sanctuary House"				55°49′56″N 4°26′08″W	Category B	39121	Upload Photo
Abbeymill, Former Anchor Mills, Seedhill Footbridge And Gate				55°50′28″N 4°25′05″W	Category B	39135	Upload Photo
11-17 (Odd Nos) George Place				55°50′35″N 4°25′34″W	Category C(S)	38987	Upload Photo
6, 8 George Street				55°50′33″N 4°25′30″W	Category B	38989	Upload Photo
3 Gilmour Street "Bank Of Scotland"				55°50′45″N 4°25′26″W	Category B	38993	Upload another image
8 Glasgow Road				55°50′49″N 4°24′56″W	Category C(S)	39002	Upload Photo
High Street, Museum, Art Gallery And Library				55°50′43″N 4°25′49″W	Category A	39025	Upload another image See more images
52 Love Street				55°51′02″N 4°25′33″W	Category B	39041	Upload Photo
Broomlands Martyrs Church				55°50′39″N 4°26′19″W	Category B	38927	Upload Photo
18-22 (Evens) Causeyside				55°50′39″N 4°25′25″W	Category B	38945	Upload Photo
Church Hill, Former Grammar School				55°50′45″N 4°25′39″W	Category B	38947	Upload Photo
Church Hill Christian Social Action Centre				55°50′45″N 4°25′38″W	Category A	38948	Upload another image
The Cross, War Memorial				55°50′44″N 4°25′27″W	Category A	38953	Upload another image
Dunn Square, Queen Victoria Monument				55°50′42″N 4°25′23″W	Category B	38956	Upload Photo
Dunn Square, "Sir Peter Coats"				55°50′43″N 4°25′24″W	Category B	38958	Upload another image
38 Ferguslie Former Stables And Gatepiers To Ferguslie Gardens				55°50′28″N 4°27′03″W	Category B	38972	Upload Photo
"West Lodge", (Of Former Ralston House,) 226 Glasgow Road, Ralston				55°50′45″N 4°23′11″W	Category B	18584	Upload Photo
The Wallace Monument, At No. 243 Main Road, Elderslie				55°50′08″N 4°29′20″W	Category B	18586	Upload another image
East Buchanan Street, Cathedral House And St Mirin's Old Academy				55°50′52″N 4°25′03″W	Category C(S)	46283	Upload another image
50 High Street And 1 Orr Square				55°50′43″N 4°25′43″W	Category C(S)	50175	Upload Photo
Penilee Road, Paisley Grammar School, Penilee Sports Pavilion				55°50′56″N 4°22′44″W	Category A	43679	Upload Photo
North Croft Street, Wallneuk Church				55°50′55″N 4°25′15″W	Category B	39068	Upload Photo
16 Oakshaw Street				55°50′47″N 4°25′41″W	Category C(S)	39080	Upload Photo
6 Orr Square				55°50′43″N 4°25′43″W	Category B	39091	Upload Photo
90 Renfrew Road				55°51′15″N 4°24′58″W	Category B	39097	Upload Photo
St James Street Sheriff Court House				55°50′55″N 4°25′37″W	Category A	39103	Upload another image
10 St Mirren Street				55°50′41″N 4°25′25″W	Category C(S)	39109	Upload Photo
School Wynd St John's Church (C Of S)				55°50′46″N 4°25′32″W	Category B	39112	Upload another image
6, 8 Smithhills Street				55°50′47″N 4°25′17″W	Category B	39114	Upload Photo
Stevenson Street, "Spiersfield" (Excluding Modern Extensions)				55°50′20″N 4°25′45″W	Category B	39115	Upload Photo
Stanely Reservoir Stanely Castle				55°49′24″N 4°27′14″W	Category B	39116	Upload Photo
Station Road Former Stable Block, And Gatepiers Ferguslie Mills				55°50′28″N 4°27′03″W	Category C(S)	39123	Upload Photo
Glasgow Road Sherwood Church				55°50′50″N 4°24′36″W	Category B	38999	Upload Photo
Hawkhead House Farm Steading Excluding Later Additions				55°49′49″N 4°23′08″W	Category B	39009	Upload Photo
Hawkhead Road, Hawkhead Hospital, Wards 7 And 8				55°50′04″N 4°23′29″W	Category A	39011	Upload Photo
Hawkhead Road, Ross House				55°50′00″N 4°23′38″W	Category B	39012	Upload Photo
20 High Street Masonic Hall				55°50′44″N 4°25′32″W	Category B	39019	Upload Photo
24 High Street				55°50′43″N 4°25′34″W	Category B	39020	Upload another image
76 High Street Territorial Army Centre				55°50′41″N 4°25′54″W	Category B	39026	Upload Photo
Lonend, Watermill Hotel				55°50′33″N 4°25′10″W	Category C(S)	39032	Upload Photo
Fountain Gardens, Love Street: Burns Statue				55°51′02″N 4°25′43″W	Category B	39036	Upload another image See more images
Abbey Bridge				55°50′38″N 4°25′15″W	Category B	38907	Upload Photo
Abbey Close "Robert Tannahill"				55°50′43″N 4°25′16″W	Category B	38909	Upload another image
Off Barrhead Road Blackhall Manor House				55°50′16″N 4°24′41″W	Category B	38922	Upload Photo
Blackstoun Road Former Glencoats Hospital East Lodge Including Gatepiers And Railings				55°50′50″N 4°26′53″W	Category B	38925	Upload Photo
Park Road, St Margaret's (Former Hospital)				55°50′02″N 4°25′53″W	Category B	38933	Upload Photo
45-47 (Odd Nos) Causeyside Street And Johnston Street				55°50′32″N 4°25′26″W	Category B	38941	Upload Photo
Causeyside Street, Russell Institute				55°50′37″N 4°25′26″W	Category A	38944	Upload another image See more images
Dunn Square, "Thomas Coats"				55°50′43″N 4°25′23″W	Category B	38957	Upload Photo
13-15 (Odd) Forbes Place				55°50′39″N 4°25′20″W	Renfrewshire - 13-15 Forbes Place, Paisley - 20240825102553.jpg	38974	Upload Photo
Thornly Park, 9 South Avenue, Holmhurst Including Terrace Wall				55°49′31″N 4°25′04″W	Category B	48037	Upload Photo
Thornly Park, 29 Thornly Park Avenue, Lismore Including Arch And Gatepeirs				55°49′37″N 4°24′50″W	Category C(S)	48044	Upload Photo
Thornly Park, 33 Thornly Park Avenue Including Boundary Walls, Gatepiers And Gates				55°49′38″N 4°24′47″W	Category C(S)	48046	Upload Photo
6 And 8 High Street, Burton's				55°50′44″N 4°25′24″W	Category B	50162	Upload another image
Blackhall Lane, Blackhall House				55°50′26″N 4°24′56″W	Category C(S)	50498	Upload Photo
Renfrew Road, Abercorn School, Including Entrance Steps And Railings				55°51′14″N 4°25′07″W	Category C(S)	45579	Upload another image See more images
4 Sandholes Street				55°50′40″N 4°26′15″W	Category C(S)	43486	Upload Photo
7 New Street The Bull Inn				55°50′41″N 4°25′34″W	Category A	39058	Upload Photo
38, 40 Oakshaw Street				55°50′46″N 4°25′51″W	Category C(S)	39083	Upload Photo
7, 9 Orr Square				55°50′45″N 4°25′44″W	Category B	39092	Upload Photo
15 School Wynd				55°50′44″N 4°25′34″W	Category B	39111	Upload Photo
Storie Street Paisley College Of Technology, Hugh Smiley Annexe Formerly Hugh Smiley Day Nursery				55°50′39″N 4°25′42″W	Category B	39124	Upload Photo
Underwood Road St James Church				55°50′55″N 4°26′01″W	Category B	39125	Upload Photo
Walker Street Former Baptist Church				55°50′37″N 4°26′08″W	Category C(S)	39127	Upload Photo
Greenhill Road, Four Square Tobacco Factory				55°51′15″N 4°26′34″W	Category B	39130	Upload Photo
Cyril Street, Violet Street, Ralston Uf Church				55°50′40″N 4°24′32″W	Category B	39139	Upload Photo
3-9 (Odd) Gauze Street Methodist Central Halls And Shops To Ground				55°50′46″N 4°25′17″W	Category B	38980	Upload another image
5 George Place				55°50′35″N 4°25′35″W	Category B	38986	Upload Photo
Glasgow Road Barshaw Park Gatepiers And Gates				55°50′48″N 4°23′44″W	Category C(S)	39001	Upload Photo
7-9 (Odd) King Street And Sandholes Street "Hayweighs"				55°50′39″N 4°26′21″W	Category B	39030	Upload Photo
30 Mansion House Road, Greenlaw House				55°50′57″N 4°24′40″W	Category B	39044	Upload Photo
Acer Crescent Balgonie				55°49′44″N 4°27′07″W	Category B	38912	Upload Photo
Mile End Mill Chimney Stack				55°50′32″N 4°24′39″W	Category B	38918	Upload Photo
Ardgowan Avenue Hunterhill House				55°50′16″N 4°25′05″W	Category B	38919	Upload Photo
20, 22 Back Sneddon Street And 13 Maxwell Street				55°50′54″N 4°25′30″W	Category B	38921	Upload Photo
Broomlands Street, Woodside Cemetery, Martyrs Memorial				55°50′37″N 4°26′33″W	Category C(S)	38928	Upload Photo
46 Broomlands Street, Woodside Crematorium				55°50′40″N 4°26′46″W	Category B	38929	Upload Photo
7 Caledonia Street				55°50′56″N 4°25′50″W	Category C(S)	38932	Upload Photo
25-29 (Odd) Causeyside And 2 Forbes Place Paisley Co-Op				55°50′38″N 4°25′23″W	Category B	38938	Upload another image
4 Dyers Wynd, Good Templar Halls And Terrace Buildings				55°50′45″N 4°25′23″W	Category B	38960	Upload Photo
Dykebar Hospital Excluding Modern Additions				55°49′26″N 4°23′52″W	Category B	38961	Upload another image
Former Ferguslie Thread Works, Counting House				55°50′23″N 4°26′55″W	Category B	38965	Upload another image
Thornly Park, 23 South Avenue, The Gables				55°49′33″N 4°24′53″W	Category B	48041	Upload Photo
Thornly Park, 12 And 12A Thornly Park Avenue, Thorncroft Including Boundary Walls And Gatepiers				55°49′33″N 4°25′03″W	Category B	48050	Upload Photo
Thornly Park 22 Thornly Park Avenue, Monimail Including Boundary Walls And Gatepiers				55°49′35″N 4°24′54″W	Category C(S)	48051	Upload Photo
5 And 7 West Paisley Brae, Paisley				55°50′41″N 4°26′06″W	Category B	49026	Upload Photo
Manor Park Avenue, Newark House				55°49′41″N 4°26′45″W	Category B	49300	Upload Photo
96 Causeyside Street				55°50′22″N 4°25′31″W	Category B	43735	Upload Photo
Glenpatrick Road, Elderslie, East Church				55°50′12″N 4°28′49″W	Category C(S)	43480	Upload Photo
58 Stock Street And Espedair Street, Monty's Snooker Hall (Former Bath House)				55°50′06″N 4°25′19″W	Category B	43487	Upload Photo
26 New Street, Conservative Club				55°50′38″N 4°25′31″W	Category B	39065	Upload Photo
40 New Sneddon Street				55°51′00″N 4°25′24″W	Category B	39067	Upload Photo
Oakshawhead Former John Neilson Institution And Entrance Lodge				55°50′43″N 4°26′03″W	Category A	39069	Upload another image See more images
18 Oakshaw Street				55°50′47″N 4°25′42″W	Category C(S)	39081	Upload Photo
42, 44 Oakshaw Street				55°50′46″N 4°25′52″W	Category B	39084	Upload Photo
56 Oakshaw Street, Peter Brough District Nurses' Home				55°50′45″N 4°25′55″W	Category B	39086	Upload Photo
72, 74 Oakshaw				55°50′45″N 4°26′02″W	Category C(S)	39090	Upload Photo
121 Renfrew Road				55°51′26″N 4°24′57″W	Category B	39095	Upload Photo
13 School Wynd, Oakshaw				55°50′44″N 4°25′33″W	Category C(S)	39110	Upload Photo
Stanely Road "Middle Park"				55°49′55″N 4°26′03″W	Category C(S)	39118	Upload Photo
Stanely Road "Moredun"				55°49′50″N 4°26′26″W	Category B	39119	Upload Photo
Anchor Buildings, Seedhill With Railings				55°50′33″N 4°25′02″W	Category B	39132	Upload Photo
25 Gauze Street				55°50′47″N 4°25′09″W	Category B	38983	Upload Photo
27 Gauze Street				55°50′47″N 4°25′08″W	Category C(S)	38984	Upload Photo
29-31 (Odd) Gauze Street				55°50′47″N 4°25′07″W	Category B	38985	Upload Photo
14 George Street St George's Church Of Scotland				55°50′34″N 4°25′33″W	Category B	38991	Upload another image See more images
10, 12 Glasgow Road				55°50′48″N 4°24′54″W	Category B	39003	Upload Photo
Gleniffer Road Macdonald's Fountain				55°48′55″N 4°27′49″W	Category B	39005	Upload Photo
Lounsdale Road Ciba-Geigy Social Club				55°50′21″N 4°26′32″W	Category B	39033	Upload Photo
7 Moss Street				55°50′45″N 4°25′29″W	Category B	39051	Upload Photo
49, 51 Moss Street				55°50′52″N 4°25′35″W	Category B	39052	Upload Photo
28 Arkleston Road				55°50′55″N 4°24′01″W	Category C(S)	38920	Upload Photo
51 Causeyside Street				55°50′31″N 4°25′26″W	Category B	38943	Upload Photo
Dunn Square				55°50′42″N 4°25′23″W	Category B	38955	Upload another image See more images
15-19 (Odd) Espedair Street				55°50′18″N 4°25′24″W	Category B	38962	Upload Photo
Ferguslie Threadworks, Stables And Store On Glasgow, Paisley And Johnstone Canal				55°50′24″N 4°26′59″W	Category C(S)	38970	Upload Photo
Thornly Park, 17 Thornly Park Avenue, Dunard Including Boundary Walls And Gatepiers				55°49′36″N 4°25′01″W	Category B	48043	Upload Photo
Thornly Park, 2 Thornly Park Avenue, Thornly Park House				55°49′31″N 4°25′13″W	Category C(S)	48048	Upload Photo
Thornly Park, 24 Thornly Park Avenue, Garail Including Ancillary Structure, Garden Wall And Gate				55°49′35″N 4°24′53″W	Category C(S)	48052	Upload Photo
17 George Street, New Jerusalem Church (Swedenborgian Church)				55°50′33″N 4°25′39″W	Category C(S)	50177	Upload Photo
Aqueduct, Blackhall				55°50′24″N 4°24′23″W	Category B	44021	Upload Photo
25-31 (Odd Nos) Weighhouse Close, New Street				55°50′39″N 4°25′36″W	Category B	39062	Upload Photo
20 New Street				55°50′39″N 4°25′33″W	Category B	39063	Upload another image
8 Oakshaw Street				55°50′47″N 4°25′38″W	Category C(S)	39077	Upload Photo
Gateway To No 46 Oakshaw Street				55°50′45″N 4°25′53″W	Category C(S)	39085	Upload Photo
98-100 Renfrew Road				55°51′18″N 4°24′57″W	Category B	39101	Upload Photo
4 St Mirren Street				55°50′42″N 4°25′26″W	Category B	39106	Upload Photo
8 St Mirren Street				55°50′42″N 4°25′25″W	Category B	39108	Upload Photo
82 Stanely Road "Whiteleigh"				55°49′44″N 4°26′31″W	Category B	39122	Upload Photo
68 Falside Road, Formerly Brown And Polson Worker`S Institute				55°49′46″N 4°25′41″W	Category B	39136	Upload Photo
23 Gauze Street				55°50′46″N 4°25′09″W	Category C(S)	38982	Upload Photo
26 High Street				55°50′43″N 4°25′34″W	Category B	39021	Upload another image
Love Street, Lodges To Fountain Gardens				55°51′02″N 4°25′35″W	Category C(S)	39034	Upload Photo
32 Love Street				55°51′00″N 4°25′34″W	Category B	39037	Upload Photo
34, 36 (Evens) Love Street				55°51′00″N 4°25′34″W	Category C(S)	39038	Upload Photo
14 Main Road Castlehead "The Old House"				55°50′20″N 4°26′08″W	Category B	39043	Upload another image
8-10 Moss Street				55°50′45″N 4°25′27″W	Category C(S)	39055	Upload Photo
Blackhall Railway Viaduct Over White Cart Water				55°50′24″N 4°24′23″W	Category A	38923	Upload Photo
Brediland Road Lounsdale House				55°49′38″N 4°27′31″W	Category B	38926	Upload Photo
8-10 Broomlands Street				55°50′39″N 4°26′18″W	Category B	38930	Upload Photo
Castlehead, Main Road, Castlehead Church, Tannahill's Monument				55°50′30″N 4°26′12″W	Category B	38936	Upload another image See more images
Nos 14-20 (Even) Forbes Place				55°50′38″N 4°25′19″W	Category B	38977	Upload Photo
Gauze Street George A Clark Statue				55°50′44″N 4°25′18″W	Category B	38979	Upload another image
"East Lodge", Darvel Crescent, Ralston, Paisley				55°50′46″N 4°22′37″W	Category C(S)	18583	Upload Photo
Leethland Glenpatrick Road				55°49′29″N 4°28′50″W	Category C(S)	18588	Upload Photo
Thornly Park, Stewart Road, Linton Including Terrace Wall				55°49′30″N 4°25′06″W	Category B	48042	Upload Photo
19 Lawn Street, Abbey Mission Hall				55°50′49″N 4°25′11″W	Category C(S)	50161	Upload Photo
5 Mansionhouse Road				55°50′52″N 4°24′41″W	Category C(S)	50163	Upload Photo
15 Abercorn Street, Former Oldfield's Machine Tools Warehouse				55°50′55″N 4°25′19″W	Category C(S)	50168	Upload Photo
Hawkhead House Farm, Farmhouse				55°49′47″N 4°23′06″W	Category C(S)	43890	Upload Photo
Cartside Mill Office Block, Milliken Park, Kilbarchan				55°49′48″N 4°31′54″W	Category B	43481	Upload Photo
4 New Street				55°50′42″N 4°25′37″W	Category C(S)	39060	Upload Photo
96 Renfrew Road				55°51′17″N 4°24′58″W	Category C(S)	39100	Upload Photo
St James' Bridge				55°50′44″N 4°25′21″W	Category B	39102	Upload Photo
2 St Mirren Street				55°50′43″N 4°25′26″W	Category B	39105	Upload Photo
Stanely Crescent, Stanely House				55°49′35″N 4°26′57″W	Category B	39117	Upload Photo
42 New Street				55°50′36″N 4°25′27″W	Category C(S)	39128	Upload another image
Abbeymill, Former Anchor Mills, Seedhill Gate House Including Gatepiers And Railings				55°50′32″N 4°25′03″W	Category B	39133	Upload another image
167 George St St Mary's Church (Rc)				55°50′30″N 4°26′32″W	Category B	38988	Upload Photo
Greenlaw Avenue Greenlaw Church				55°50′52″N 4°24′45″W	Category B	39008	Upload another image
41 High Street And 2 New Street				55°50′42″N 4°25′37″W	Category C(S)	39016	Upload Photo
32 High Street Liberal Club				55°50′43″N 4°25′37″W	Category C(S)	39024	Upload another image
12 Main Road Castlehead The Mound				55°50′21″N 4°26′10″W	Category B	39042	Upload Photo
38 Mansion House Road, Garage				55°50′59″N 4°24′39″W	Category B	39045	Upload Photo
85 Maxwellton Road				55°50′26″N 4°26′58″W	Category B	39047	Upload Photo
68 Maxwellton Road				55°49′42″N 4°26′50″W	Category B	39048	Upload Photo
Abbey Close Place Of Paisley				55°50′41″N 4°25′14″W	Category A	38911	Upload another image
Anchor Mills, Former No 1 Embroidery Mill				55°50′33″N 4°24′59″W	Category B	38916	Upload another image See more images
Blackhall Street Anchor Recreation Club				55°50′22″N 4°24′39″W	Category B	38924	Upload Photo
Castlehead, Main Road, Castlehead Church (Church Of Scotland) With Graveyard				55°50′29″N 4°26′11″W	Category C(S)	38935	Upload another image See more images
33 Causeyside Street And 1 Orchard Street				55°50′36″N 4°25′24″W	Category B	38939	Upload Photo
49 Causeyside Street				55°50′31″N 4°25′26″W	Category C(S)	38942	Upload Photo
Church Hill And Oakshaw Street, High Church				55°50′46″N 4°25′41″W	Category A	38946	Upload another image See more images
County Square, Gilmour Street Railway Station				55°50′50″N 4°25′28″W	Category B	38950	Upload another image See more images
County Square, Head Post Office				55°50′49″N 4°25′29″W	Category B	38952	Upload another image See more images
Former Ferguslie Thread Works, North Gatehouse And Gates				55°50′25″N 4°26′59″W	Category B	38967	Upload Photo
Former Ferguslie Thread Works, Tannahill's Hole				55°50′20″N 4°26′33″W	Category C(S)	38969	Upload Photo
27 Ferguslie And 78 Maxwellton Road				55°50′28″N 4°26′56″W	Category B	38971	Upload Photo
Nos 4 And 6 Forbes Place				55°50′38″N 4°25′23″W	Category C(S)	38975	Upload Photo
Thornly Park,11 South Avenue, Wilmar Including Gates				55°49′31″N 4°25′02″W	Category C(S)	48038	Upload Photo
Thornly Park, 31 Thornly Park Avenue, Ardyne Including Gates				55°49′38″N 4°24′48″W	Category B	48045	Upload Photo

== Key ==
The scheme for classifying buildings in Scotland is:

- Category A: "buildings of national or international importance, either architectural or historic; or fine, little-altered examples of some particular period, style or building type."
- Category B: "buildings of regional or more than local importance; or major examples of some particular period, style or building type, which may have been altered."
- Category C: "buildings of local importance; lesser examples of any period, style, or building type, as originally constructed or moderately altered; and simple traditional buildings which group well with other listed buildings."

In March 2016 there were 47,288 listed buildings in Scotland. Of these, 8% were Category A, and 50% were Category B, with the remaining 42% being Category C.
