= List of listed buildings in Renfrew, Renfrewshire =

This is a list of listed buildings in the parish of Renfrew in Renfrewshire, Scotland.

== List ==
Name	Location	Date Listed	Grid Ref. (Note: Sometimes known as OSGB36, the grid reference (where provided) is based on the British national grid reference system used by the Ordnance Survey. • "Guide to National Grid". Ordnance Survey. • "Get-a-map". Ordnance Survey.)	Geo-coordinates	Notes	LB Number (Note: Historic Environment Scotland assign a unique alphanumeric identifier to each designated site in Scotland, for listed buildings this always begins with "LB", for example "LB12345".)	Image
Broadloan, Muirpark Avenue, Muirpark House				55°52′11″N 4°23′47″W	Category B	42913	Upload Photo
Bank Of Scotland Hairst Street And High Street				55°52′43″N 4°23′13″W	Category B	40418	Upload Photo
Bank Of Scotland, 1 High Street And Canal Street				55°52′44″N 4°23′11″W	Category B	40427	Upload Photo
Paisley Road, Renfrew Trinity Church (Church Of Scotland), Including Boundary Walls, Gates And Gatepiers				55°52′36″N 4°23′25″W	Category C(S)	51286	Upload Photo
Renfield Street, Renfrew North Parish Church With Boundary Walls, Railings, Gates And Gatepiers				55°52′50″N 4°23′12″W	Category B	44585	Upload Photo
White Cart Bridge, Inchinnan Road, Over Part Of White Cart Water				55°52′49″N 4°24′38″W	Category A	40424	Upload Photo
The Cross, Renfrew Town Hall				55°52′44″N 4°23′14″W	Category A	40430	Upload another image See more images
Brown Institute, 41 Canal Street				55°52′48″N 4°23′08″W	Category B	40426	Upload another image
Renfield Street, Formerly Renfrew Parish Council Chambers				55°52′49″N 4°23′11″W	Category B	40429	Upload Photo
Ferry Inn, Ferry Road & Clyde Street, Renfrew Ferry				55°53′08″N 4°23′00″W	Category C(S)	40419	Upload another image See more images
Victory Baths, Inchinnan Road				55°52′42″N 4°23′24″W	Category B	40420	Upload another image See more images
13, 15 And 17 Clyde Street				55°53′10″N 4°23′05″W	Category C(S)	43889	Upload Photo
Wheatsheaf Public House, Canal Street				55°52′45″N 4°23′13″W	Category C(S)	40422	Upload Photo
Rolling Lift Bridge Over White Cart Water				55°52′48″N 4°24′35″W	Category A	40425	Upload another image See more images
Renfrew Old Parish Church High Street				55°52′40″N 4°23′11″W	Category B	40416	Upload Photo
Two Monuments Within Renfrew Old Parish Church, High Street				55°52′40″N 4°23′11″W	Category A	40417	Upload Photo
County Police Chambers, Inchinnan Road				55°52′42″N 4°23′25″W	Category B	40421	Upload another image
Argyle Stone & St Conval's "Chariot" By Blythswood West Lodge Inchinnan Road				55°52′48″N 4°24′28″W	Category B	40423	Upload another image See more images
4-24 (Even Nos) High Street				55°52′42″N 4°23′12″W	Category B	40428	Upload Photo

== Key ==
The scheme for classifying buildings in Scotland is:

- Category A: "buildings of national or international importance, either architectural or historic; or fine, little-altered examples of some particular period, style or building type."
- Category B: "buildings of regional or more than local importance; or major examples of some particular period, style or building type, which may have been altered."
- Category C: "buildings of local importance; lesser examples of any period, style, or building type, as originally constructed or moderately altered; and simple traditional buildings which group well with other listed buildings."

In March 2016 there were 47,288 listed buildings in Scotland. Of these, 8% were Category A, and 50% were Category B, with the remaining 42% being Category C.
