= Waterston (disambiguation) =

Waterston is a village near Milford Haven in Pembrokeshire, south Wales.

Waterston may also refer to:

- Waterston House, the headquarters of the Scottish Ornithologists' Club in Aberlady, East Lothian, Scotland
- Waterston Manor, a 17th-century manor house in Puddletown, Dorset, England

== People with the surname ==
- Alisse Waterston (born 1951), American cultural anthropologist
- Andrew Rodger Waterston (1912-1996) Scottish zoologist and son of James Waterston (entomologist)
- Anna Cabot Lowell Quincy Waterston (1812–1899), American writer
- Archie Waterston (1902–1982), Scottish footballer from the 1920s and 1930s
- Darren Waterston (born 1965), American painter
- David Waterston (anatomist) (born 1871), Scottish surgeon and anatomist
- George Waterston (1911–1980), Scottish ornithologist and conservationist
- James Waterston (born 1969), American actor and son of Sam Waterston
- James Waterston (entomologist) (1879-1930) Scottish entomologist and Presbyterian minister
- Jane Elizabeth Waterston (1843–1932), Scottish teacher
- John James Waterston (1811–1883), Scottish physicist
- Katherine Waterston (born 1980), American actress and daughter of Sam Waterston
- Sam Waterston (born 1940), American actor, producer and director
