= Andrew Rodger Waterston =

Scottish zoologist

Dr Andrew Rodger Waterston OBE FRSE FRES (30 March 1912 – 12 July 1996) was a Scottish zoologist, specialising in malacology and entomology. He was interested in the insect fauna of the Middle East and in the fauna of the Outer Hebrides. He was generally known as Rodger Waterston.

== Early life and pre-war career ==
Rodger Waterston was born in the manse on 30 March 1912 in Ollaberry on mainland Shetland, where his father, the entomologist James Waterston, was a minister in the United Free Church at the time.

When his father was appointed as an entomologist at the Imperial Bureau of Entomology in 1917 the family moved to London. In London, Rodger attended St Paul's School. Through his father he came to know many of the respected entomologists of that time, whilst he developed his own interests in entomology and acquired the field skills which were to serve him in his career. He returned to Scotland, where he studied Zoology at the University of Edinburgh, graduating with a first-class honours BSc degree in 1934. His undergraduate thesis was entitled "On some points in the anatomy, histology and relationships of a new British slug (genus Limax)", about a greenhouse alien since named in his honour Ambigolimax waterstoni. He participated in the Edinburgh University Biological Society expedition to survey and record the fauna and flora of Barra in 1935.

In 1938 he married Marie Elizabeth Campbell, whom he had studied alongside. They had a daughter, Susan.

In 1935 he took a position as an Assistant Keeper of the invertebrate collections at the Royal Scottish Museum, giving up his postgraduate studies. He was a specialist in entomology, but his interests and expertise were wider, and he had already published papers on molluscs and other invertebrates. Although he became more specialised as an entomologist as his career progressed, he maintained an interest in a broader range of insects and continued to publish papers on other zoological groups. In 1938, he became the Conchological Society's Recorder for non-marine Mollusca, although his efforts to update the Society's records were interrupted by his war service.

== Second World War and the Middle East ==
When the Second World War broke out in 1939 he was seconded to the Ministry of War Transport as District Transport Officer for Clydeside, based in Paisley, where he was able to spend some of his spare time examining and rearranging the important entomological collection left to the Paisley Museum by the pioneering Scottish entomologist Morris Young. In 1942 he joined the Royal Scots, with which he served for a year before being transferred to the Colonial Office, where he was appointed to the Middle East Supply Centre in Cairo; his role there was Locust Officer in the Middle East Anti-Locust Unit, and he took charge of the Palestine Anti-Locust Unit in Saudi Arabia. After the war ended, Waterston remained with the Colonial Office and travelled widely in the Middle East, northern Africa, and India constructing a framework for monitoring and controlling the locust. In 1947 he was appointed chief locust officer responsible for locust monitoring and control in the Middle East, Ethiopia, and Eritrea. He was Entomological Advisor to the British Middle East Office and Attaché for Scientific Affairs at the British Embassies in Cairo and Beirut. Waterston conducted research in the Middle East, but he mainly worked to establish technical cooperation and coordination for controlling the desert locust under challenging international conditions. In 1952 he was awarded the Order of the British Empire in recognition of this work.

== Later career and retirement ==
He returned to Scotland in 1952, working from the Royal Scottish Museum, where he was appointed Keeper of Natural History in 1958. He retired from that post in 1973 but was retained as an Emeritus Researcher until 1978. Under Waterston the museum's collections were increased and developed, with Waterston often using his contacts in the Middle East to add to the collections. Prior to the war his specialism was in the Hemiptera and Hymenoptera but in response to the bequest of the collection of Kenneth Morton he switched to Neuroptera and Odonata, publishing papers on the dragonflies of the Middle East, especially after he retired. He also published important papers on the fauna and ecology of the Outer Hebrides, an interest that was sparked on the 1935 Expedition.

In 1946 he was elected a Fellow of the Royal Society of Edinburgh. His proposers were Alexander Charles Stephen, Sir William Wright Smith, James Ritchie and D'Arcy Wentworth Thompson. In 1982, he was awarded the Society's Neill Prize Medal in recognition of his contribution to the natural history of the Hebrides and to Scottish entomology. Waterston co-edited the "Scottish Naturalist" from just before the war and again from 1983, where he set editorial standards, and he advised Curwen Press and then Harley Books, helping them to achieve exceptional standards in their entomological publications. He was one of the founders of the Scottish Natural History Library, and was instrumental in it acquiring the library of the Royal Physical Society of Edinburgh and the natural history holdings of the Royal Society of Edinburgh. He was also, like his father, a curator at the Department of Entomology of the British Museum (Natural History). He was awarded the OBE in 1952 for his work on locust control.

== Publications ==
The following is a list of the publications authored or co-authored by A. Rodger Waterston.

- Waterston, A.R, (1929). Some land and freshwater Mollusca from Kincardineshire. Scottish Naturalist, 1929: 89–90.
- Waterston, A.R. (1931). Acme lineata (Drap.) in Midlothian. Scottish Naturalist, 1931: 152.
- Waterston, A.R., Boycott, A.E. and Oldham, C. (1932). Notes on the lake Lymnctea of south-west Ireland. Proceedings of the Malacological Society of London, 20: 105–127.
- Waterston, A.R. and Kevan, D.K. (1933). Vertigo lilljeborgi (Westd.) in Great Britain (with additional Irish localities). Journal of Conchology, 19: 296–313.
- Waterston, A.R. (1934). Occurrence of Amnicola taylori (E.A. Smith) and Bythinia leachii (Sheppard) in Scotland. Journal of Conchology, 20: 55–56.
- Waterston, A.R. (1934). Notes on the distribution of some Perthshire molluscs. Transactions and Proceedings of the Perthshire Society of Natural Science, 9:121-124.
- Waterston, A.R. (1935). A beetle, Oncomera femorata (F.), new to the Scottish fauna. Scottish Naturalist, 1935: 98.
- Waterston, A.R. (1935). A leech, Glossiphonia heteroclita (Linn.), new to the Scottish fauna. Scottish Naturalist, 1935: 98.
- Waterston, A.R. (1935). The land planarians of the British Isles. Scottish Naturalist, 1935: 103–109.
- Waterston, A.R. (1936). Partridge versus Heather Beetle. Scottish Naturalist, 1936: 30.
- Waterston, A.R. (1936). A water bug (Corixa dentipes Thoms.) new to the Scottish fauna. Scottish Naturalist, 1936: 85.
- Forrest, J.E., Waterston, A.R. and Watson, E.V. (Eds.) (1936). The natural history of Barra, Outer Hebrides. The results of a scientific expedition organised by the Biological Society of the University of Edinburgh, 1 to 14 July 1935. Proceedings of the Royal Physical Society of Edinburgh, 22. 240–296.

The fauna (with J.E. Forrest), 260-262.

Diplopoda and Chilopoda, 271.
Thysanura and Collembola, 271-272.
Orthoptera and Dermaptera, 272.
Plecoptera, Ephemeroptera and Psocoptera, 273.
Odonata, 273-274.
Trichoptera, 277-278.
Lepidoptera (with D.C. Thomas), 278-281.
Coleoptera, 281-283.
Hymenoptera, 283-284.
Diptera, 284-286.
Arachnida (with M.l. Crichton), 286-289.
Land and freshwater Mollusca, 290-294.

- Waterston, A.R. (1936). Obituary. James Hartley Ashworth (1 874-1 936). North Western Naturalist, 11: 278–279.
- Waterston, A.R. (1936). Further records of the distribution of the leech, Glossiphonici heteroclita (Linn.) in Scotland. Scottish Naturalist, 1936: 63.
- Waterston, A.R. and Quick, H.E. (1937). Geonemertes dendyi Dakin, a land nemertean in Wales. Proceedings of the Royal Society of Edinburgh, 57: 379–84.
- Waterston, A.R. (1937). Mottled Hairworm, Gordius villoti (Rosa), in Dumfries. Scottish Naturalist, 1937: 6.
- Waterston, A.R. (1937). Goat Moth, Tryponus cossus L., in Caithness. Scottish Naturalist, 1937: 1 14.
- Waterston, A.R. (1937). Death's Head Hawk Moth (Acherontia atropos (L.)) in Argyll. Scottish Naturalist, 1937: 162.
- Waterston, A.R. (1937). Mottled Hairworm (Gordius villoti (Rosa)) in Edinburgh. Scottish Naturalist, 1937: 162.
- Waterston, A.R. (1938). Goat Moth in Caithness: a correction. Scottish Naturalist, 1938: 144.
- Waterston, A.R. (1938). Two rare Diptera (Asilidae) in Perth mid. Scottish Naturalist, 1938: 174.
- Waterston, A.R. (1938). Cidaria obstipata Fab. = fluviata Hbn. (Lepidoptera, Geometridae) in Scotland. Scottish Naturalist, 1938: 174.
- Waterston, A.R. (1939). Migratory locust in Scotland. Scottish Naturalist, 1939: 48.
- Waterston, A.R. (1939). Some Hemiptera from West Ross. Scottish Naturalist, 1939: 77–83.
- Waterston, A.R. (1939). Planer's Lamprey, Lampetra planeri (Bloch), in Easterness. Scottish Naturalist, 1939: 126.
- Waterston, A.R. (1939). Insects from Colonsay, South Ebudes. Scottish Naturalist, 1939: 128–131.
- Waterston, A.R. (1939). Millipede, Polyxenus lagurus (L.), in Ayrshire. Scottish Naturalist, 1939: 132.
- Waterston, A.R. (1939). A discussion on the variation of Lymnaea in shell form and anatomy with special reference to L. peregra, L. involuta and allied forms. Proceedings of the Malacological Society of London, 23: 303–315.
- Waterston, A.R. (1939). Recorder's report (non-marine Mollusca). Journal of Conchology, 21: 150.
- Waterston, A.R. (1940). Recorder's report (non-marine Mollusca). Journal of Conchology, 21: 216–218.
- Waterston, A.R. (1941). Recorder's report (non-marine Mollusca). Journal of Conchology, 21: 284–285.
- Waterston, A.R. (1942). Recorder's report (non-marine Mollusca). Journal of Conchology, 21: 337.
- Waterston, A.R. (1948). Moroccan Locust in Cyprus. Report in Anti-Locust Research Centre. London: British Museum (Natural History).
- Waterston, A.R. (1949). Moroccan Locust in Cyprus. Report in Anti-Locust Research Centre. London: British Museum (Natural History).
- Waterston, A.R. (1951). Observations on the Moroccan Locust (Dociostaurus marocccmus Thunberg) in Cyprus, 1950. 4. Observations on adult locusts. Anti-Locust Bulletin, 10: 36–52.
- Waterston, A.R. (1956). Corixa striata (L.) sensu Jaczewski 1924 (Hem., Corixidae) in east Kent. Entomologist's Monthly Magazine, 92: 142–143.
- Waterston, A.R. (1964). On Zygimus nigriceps (Fallen 1829) (Hem., Miridae) and its host-plant. Entomologist, 97: 248–249.
- Waterston, A.R. (1966). Dr. A. C. Stephen. Nature, 21 1 : 21.
- Waterston, A.R. (1967). Alexander Charles Stephen, D.Sc. (Aberd.). Yearbook of the Royal Society of Edinburgh, 1967: 33–34.
- Waterston, A.R. (1968). William Alexander Francis Balfour-Browne, M.A. (Oxon., Cantab.), F.Z.S., F.L.S., F.R.E.S., F.R.M.S. Yearbook of the Royal Society of Edinburgh, 1968: 8–10.
- Waterston, A.R. (1969). Douglas Keely Kevan, F.A.C.C.A., F.R.E.S. Yearbook of the Royal Society of Edinburgh, 1 969: 41–42.
- Waterston, A.R. (1971). Douglas Keely Kevan, 1895–1968. Journal of Conchology. 26: 419–421.
- Waterston, A.R. (1976). On the genus Cordulegaster Leach, 1815 (Odonata) with special reference to the Sicilian species. Transactions of the Royal Society of Edinburgh, 69: 457–466.
- Waterston, A.R. (1976). Robert Waldron Plenderleith, B.Sc. (St. Andrews), F.M.A. Yearbook of the Royal Society of Edinburgh, 1976: 68–69.
- Tjeder, B. and Waterston, A.R. (1977). Ptyngidricerus venustus n.sp. from Oman and Iran (Neuroptera: Ascalaphidae). Entomologica Scandinavica, 8: 87–92.
- Waterston, A.R. (1977). James Murray, 1865-1914 - pioneer freshwater biologist, polar scientist and taxonomist. Yearbook of the Royal Society of Edinburgh, 1977: 21–15.
- Waterston, A.R., Holden, A.V., Campbell, R.N. and Maitland, P.S. (1979). The inland waters of the Outer Hebrides. Proceedings of the Royal Society of Edinburgh', 77B: 329–351.
- Waterston, A.R. and Lyster, I.H.J. (1979). The macrofauna of brackish and fresh waters of the Loch Druidibeg National Nature Reserve and its neighbourhood. South Uist. Proceedings of the Royal Society of Edinburgh, 77B: 353–376.
- Waterston, A.R. (1980). Insects of Saudi Arabia: Odonata. Fauna of Saudi Arabia, 2: 57–70.
- Waterston, A.R. (1980). The scientific results of the Oman Flora and Fauna Survey 1977 (Dhofar). The dragonflies (Odonata) of Dhofar. Journal of Oman Studies, Special Report No. 2: 1 49-15 1 .
- Waterston, A.R. (1981). Present knowledge of the non-marine invertebrate fauna of the Outer Hebrides. Proceedings of the Royal Society of Edinburgh, 79B: 215–321.
- Waterston, A.R. (1984). A new genus and species of platycnemidid dragonfly from the Arabian Peninsula (Zygoptera). Odonatologica, 13: 139–146.
- Waterston, A.R. (1984). Insects of Southern Arabia: Odonata from the Yemens and Saudi Arabia. Fauna of Saudi Arabia, 6: 451–472.
- Waterston, A.R. and Pittaway, A.R. (1989). The Odonata or dragonflies of Oman and neighbouring territories. Journal of Oman Studies, 10: 131–168.

== Eponyms ==
The following species were named after A.R. Waterston.

- The moth Earias waterstoni Wiltshire, 1947, now considered a synonym of Earias chlorophyllana. Waterston collected the holotype.
- The moth Armada waterstoni Wiltshire, 1949, treated now as the subspecies Epharmottomena tenera waterstoni. Waterston collected the holotype.
- The damselfly Calopteryx waterstoni Schneider, 1984. "Special thanks are accorded to Dr A.R. Waterston (Edinburgh) who also realized that the specimens in question represent a new species, but left the description to me."
- The terrestrial slug Ambigolimax waterstoni Hutchinson et al., 2022. As an undergraduate Waterston studied the species in the Royal Botanic Garden Edinburgh. One of his preserved specimens became the holotype almost 90 years later.
