= Philosophical Institution =

Philosophical Institution may refer to:

- Beaumont Philosophical Institution, see John Thomas Barber Beaumont
- Cornwall Literary and Philosophical Institution, now the Royal Institution of Cornwall
- Edinburgh Philosophical Institution, now the Royal Society of Edinburgh
- Paisley Philosophical Institution

== See also ==
- Philosophical Society
