= Harry L. Watson =

American historian

Harry L. Watson is an American historian of the antebellum American South, Jacksonian America, and the history of North Carolina. He is formerly the Director of the Center for the Study of the American South at the University of North Carolina. He also holds the title of the Atlanta Distinguished Professor in Southern Culture in the Department of History at UNC-Chapel Hill.

Watson is an alumnus of Brown University and received a Ph.D. from Northwestern University in 1976.

== Bibliography ==
- Watson, Harry L. (1981). Jacksonian Politics and Community Conflict: The Emergence of the Second American Party System in Cumberland County, North Carolina. Baton Rouge: Louisiana State University Press. ISBN 0-8071-0857-X.
- Watson, Harry L.; Jean B. Anderson (1983). An Independent People: The Way We Lived in North Carolina, 1770-1820. Chapel Hill: University of North Carolina Press. ISBN 0-8078-1550-0.
- Watson, Harry L. (1990). Liberty and Power: The Politics of Jacksonian America. New York: Hill and Wang. ISBN 0-8090-6546-0.
- Watson, Harry L. (1998). Andrew Jackson vs. Henry Clay: Democracy and Development in Antebellum America. Boston: Bedford/St. Martin's. ISBN 0-312-17772-0.
- Peacock, James L. (2005). Harry L. Watson; Carrie R. Matthews (eds.). The American South in a Global World. Chapel Hill: University of North Carolina Press. ISBN 0-8078-2924-2.
