= Paisley Art Institute =

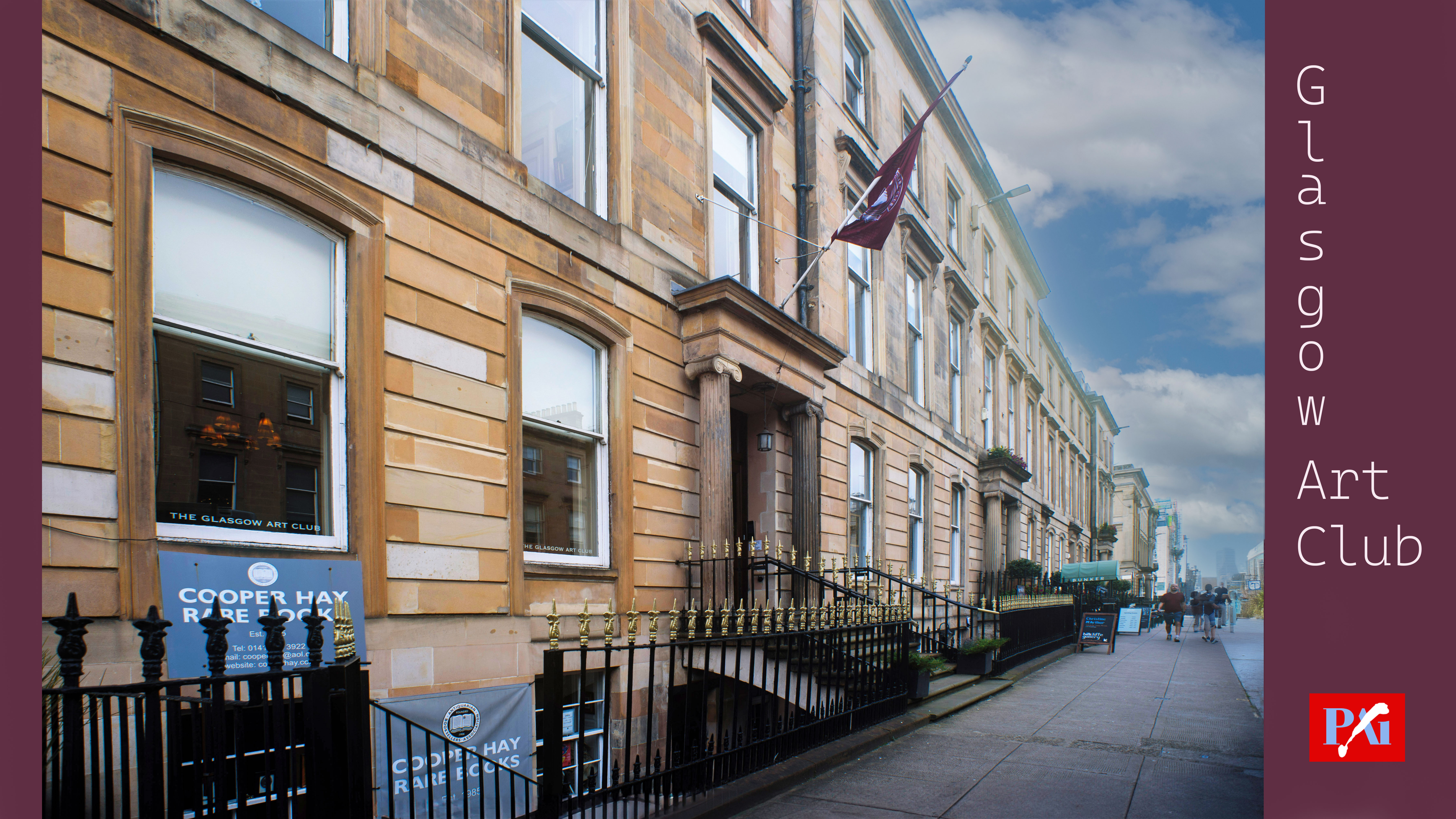
Paisley Art Institute and Glasgow Art Club, 185 Bath Street, Glasgow MMC

The Paisley Art Institute is a Scottish art organisation founded in 1876, evolving from the Paisley Fine Art Society in 1829. It is an established registered charity, registration no.SC000840. As well as encouraging arts and artists, and presenting annual exhibitions, the institute has built up a substantial collection of 450 works by Scottish and international artists.

Works from the institute's collection were for many years on public view in Paisley Museum and Art Galleries, whose six art galleries were also the institute's annual exhibiting space.

The Museum and Art Galleries were gifted to the town of Paisley by the sewing thread industrialist Sir Peter Coats in 1871, one of the leading founders of Paisley Art Institute. The art historian Kenneth Clark, whose family wealth was derived from the town's Clark Thread Company, served as honorary vice president between 1965 and 1983.

Following the closure by Renfrewshire County Council of Paisley Museum and Art Galleries for redevelopment, and planned re-emergence as only Paisley Museum - without art galleries- the OneRen agency of the County Council offered only a small space for permanent and temporary exhibition in the future building, which the Institute decided was unacceptable, and not conforming to the legal contract of many years standing. Renfrewshire Council have also sought £10,000 per year from the institute to continue storing the Institute's Collection. As a result of the dispute, and the need to find a new home and storage facilities, the Institute's annual exhibitions are now held in the premises of Glasgow Art Club.

The Paisley Art Institute has its homebase at 185 Bath Street, Glasgow sharing the premises of Glasgow Art Club.
