= Ramona Pérez =

American anthropologist

- Education: San Diego State University (BA); University of California, Riverside (MA, PhD)
- Scientific career
- Fields: Anthropology
- Workplaces: San Diego State University
- Website: ramonaperez.sdsu.edu

Ramona L. Pérez is an American cultural anthropologist specializing in Latin American studies, medical anthropology, and migration. She is a Professor of Anthropology at San Diego State University, where she also serves as Director of the Center for Latin American Studies and Chair of the Aztec Identity Initiative.

She was the President of the American Anthropological Association from 2021 to 2023.

== Biography ==
Pérez earned a bachelor's degree in anthropology from San Diego State University (SDSU) in 1992, and a master's degree and Ph.D. in anthropology from the University of California, Riverside. She then spent four years as an assistant professor at the University of North Texas and then moved to the SDSU, where she initially became an assistant professor, then became an associate professor in 2006, and has been a full professor since 2012.
