= American Anthropological Association =

American learned society in Virginia, U.S.

- Abbreviation: AAA
- Formation: 1902
- Headquarters: Arlington, Virginia
- Members: 10,000+
- President: Whitney Battle-Baptiste
- Executive Director: Ady Arguelles-Sabatier
- Website: americananthro.org

The American Anthropological Association (AAA) is an American organization of scholars and practitioners in the field of anthropology. With 10,000 members, the association, based in Arlington, Virginia, includes archaeologists, cultural anthropologists, biological (or physical) anthropologists, linguistic anthropologists, linguists, medical anthropologists and applied anthropologists in universities and colleges, research institutions, government agencies, museums, corporations and non-profits throughout the world. The AAA publishes more than 20 peer-reviewed scholarly journals, available in print and online through AnthroSource. The AAA was founded in 1902.

== History ==
The first anthropological society in the US was the American Ethnological Society of New York, which was founded by Albert Gallatin and revived in 1899 by Franz Boas after a hiatus. 1879 saw the establishment of the Anthropological Society of Washington (which first published the journal American Anthropologist, before it became a national journal), and 1882 saw the American Association for the Advancement of Science established an anthropological section. Boas and other anthropologist discussed the possibility of creating a single national society already in 1898, but fears that it might damage the AAAS caused a long discussion. In 1901 the AES and ASW sent members to attend the meeting of the AAAS anthropologists in Chicago in which discussions continued and there was general agreement that a national society should be formed. Boas advocated a restricted membership of 40 "professional anthropologists", but the AAA's first president, W. J. McGee, ensured that membership would be open to everyone with an interest in the discipline. At its incorporation, it assumed responsibility for the journal American Anthropologist, created in 1888 by the Anthropological Society of Washington (ASW).

Business affairs are conducted by a 41-member Section Assembly representing each of the association's constituent sections, and a 15-member Executive Board.

According to its articles of incorporation, the AAA was formed to:

promote the science of anthropology, to stimulate and coordinate the efforts of American anthropologists, to foster local and other societies devoted to anthropology, to serve as a bond among American anthropologists and anthropologic[al] organizations present and prospective, and to publish and encourage the publication of matter pertaining to anthropology.

From an initial membership of 175, the AAA grew slowly during the first half of the 20th century. Annual meetings were held primarily in the Northeast and accommodated all attendees in a single room.

The Association describes itself as "a democratic organization since its beginning."

In 2010, AAA Executive Board stripped the word "science" from a draft statement of its long-range plan, instead pledging to advance "the public understanding of humankind." The change set off a wide-ranging controversy over the definition of the discipline, with many archaeologists and physical anthropologists describing themselves as marginalized within the AAA. The final version of the long-range plan begins, "The strength of Anthropology lies in its distinctive position at the nexus of the sciences and humanities" and declares, "The purpose of the Association shall be to advance scholarly understanding of humankind in all its aspects ... drawing from and building upon knowledge from biological and physical sciences as well as the humanities and social sciences."

The offices of the AAA are located in Arlington, Virginia.

== Sections ==
The AAA is composed of 40 sections, which are groups organized around identity affiliations or intellectual interests within the discipline of anthropology. Sections each have an elected president or chair; many publish journals and host meetings.

=== Sections ===
- American Ethnological Society (AES)
- Anthropology and the Environment (A&E)
- The Archaeology Division of the American Anthropological Association (AD)
- Association for Africanist Anthropology (AfAA)
- Association for Feminist Anthropology (AFA)
- Association for Political and Legal Anthropology (APLA)
- Association for Queer Anthropology (AQA)
- Association for the Anthropology of Policy (ASAP)
- Association of Black Anthropologists (ABA)
- Association of Indigenous Anthropologists (AIA)
- Association of Latina and Latino Anthropologists (ALLA)
- Association of Senior Anthropologists (ASA)
- Biological Anthropology Section (BAS)
- Central States Anthropological Association (CSAS)
- Council for Museum Anthropology (CMA)
- Council on Anthropology and Education (CAE)
- Culture and Agriculture (C&A)
- Evolutionary Anthropology Society (EAS)
- General Anthropology Division (GAD)
- Middle East Section (MES)
- National Association for the Practice of Anthropology (NAPA)
- National Association of Student Anthropologists (NASA)
- Society for Anthropological Sciences (SAS)
- Society for Anthropology in Community Colleges (SACC)
- Society for Cultural Anthropology (SCA)
- Society for East Asian Anthropology (SEAA)
- Society for Economic Anthropology (SEA)
- Society for Humanistic Anthropology (SHA)
- Society for Latin American and Caribbean Anthropology (SLACA)
- Society for Linguistic Anthropology (SLA)
- Society for Medical Anthropology (SMA)
- Society for Psychological Anthropology (SPA)
- Society for the Anthropology of Consciousness (SAC)
- Society for the Anthropology of Europe (SAE)
- Society for the Anthropology of Food and Nutrition (SAFN)
- Society for the Anthropology of North America (SANA)
- Society for the Anthropology of Religion (SAR)
- Society for the Anthropology of Work (SAW)
- Society for Urban, National, and Transnational/Global Anthropology (SUNTA)
- Society for Visual Anthropology (SVA)

== Publications ==
The AAA publishes more than 20 section publications including American Anthropologist, American Ethnologist, Cultural Anthropology, Anthropology & Education Quarterly and Medical Anthropology Quarterly. The AAA's official magazine, Anthropology News, is published bimonthly. AAA publications are available online through AnthroSource. Since 2007, journals have been published in partnership with Wiley-Blackwell since 2007. Since 1962 the association has published the AAA AnthroGuide, giving staff and program information about anthropology departments.

== Public issues involvement ==
The AAA supported the passage of the Antiquities Act of 1906, protested the discontinuance of anthropological research in the Philippines (1915), urged the teaching of anthropology in high schools (1927), spoke out for the preservation of archaeological materials when dams were built by the Tennessee Valley Authority (1935), passed a pre-WWII resolution against racism (1938), and expressed the need to "guard against the dangers, and utilize the promise, inherent in the use of atomic energy" (1945).

In the 1960s and early 1970s, the association examined the issues of government-sponsored classified research, use of anthropologists by the military in Vietnam, secret research in Thailand, and the general problem of a code of ethics for anthropological research, particularly for the protection of the rights of those studied. Other issues addressed from the 1970s through the 1980s included illegal antiquities trade, the insertion of religious beliefs into social science texts, the preservation of endangered nonhuman primates, and the religious significance of peyote to Native Americans.

In 2004, in response to President George W. Bush's call for a constitutional amendment banning same-sex marriage, the Association issued a statement on marriage and the family. It states:

The results of more than a century of anthropological research on households, kinship relationships, and families, across cultures and through time, provide no support whatsoever for the view that either civilization or viable social orders depend upon marriage as an exclusively heterosexual institution. Rather, anthropological research supports the conclusion that a vast array of family types, including families built upon same-sex partnerships, can contribute to stable and humane societies.

The Association also has adopted resolutions against the 2003 invasion of Iraq, against the use of anthropological knowledge as an element for physical or psychological torture, and against any covert or overt U.S. military action against Iran. Following a referendum in 2023, the Association endorsed a boycott of Israeli academic institutions, joining the BDS movement.

A number of ideologically polarized debates within the discipline of anthropology have prompted the association to conduct investigations. These include the dispute between Derek Freeman and defenders of Margaret Mead, as well as the controversy over the book Darkness in El Dorado. In the latter case, Alice Dreger, an historian of medicine and science, and an outsider to the debate, concluded after a year of research that the American Anthropological Association was complicit and irresponsible in helping spread the falsehoods contained in the book, and not protecting "scholars from baseless and sensationalistic charges".

=== Race ===
The AAA has issued a number of statements on the topic of race, and since the 1950s has argued publicly that race is best understood as a cultural or bio-cultural rather than mostly biological construction.

In the 1990s, in response to what it felt was public confusion about the meaning of "race," particularly perceived public misconceptions about race and intelligence, the AAA Executive Board commissioned the American Anthropological Association Statement on Race, and said that race is a constructed social mechanism "...race as it is understood in the United States of America was a social mechanism invented..." The statement clarified: "With the vast expansion of scientific knowledge in this century, however, it has become clear that human populations are not unambiguous, clearly demarcated, biologically distinct groups."

In 2006, the association developed and continues to manage a public education program titled "RACE: Are We So Different?" The program includes a traveling museum exhibit, an interactive website, and educational materials.

=== Human rights ===
Initially, AAA was highly skeptical of the concept of universal human rights, with some anthropologists arguing that because of cultural relativism there are no principles that can be universally valid for humans of all cultures. IN 1947 the AAA issued a statement on Human rights, noting that value judgments are culturally contextual and arguing that a declaration about universal human rights ought to take into consideration and encompass all the different human value systems. This stance has gradually been abandoned by most anthropologists, many of whom today see universal human rights as an important way through which discrimination and oppression of cultural minorities can be reduced.

=== Immigration policy ===
==== Arizona ====
On May 22, 2010, the AAA Executive Board issued a resolution that declared Arizona's SB1070, a law which empowers state law enforcement to assist with the enforcement of federal law, to be "unconstitutional." The Board claimed it would boycott Arizona, but would not boycott "Indian Reservations" within the state, until the law "is either repealed or struck down as constitutionally invalid." The Board did not state what it will do if the courts uphold SB1070 as constitutionally valid.

The Board stated that "The AAA has a long and rich history of supporting policies that prohibit discrimination based on ... national origin ..."

On September 19, 2016, the U.S. District Court in Arizona entered a permanent injunction barring enforcement of the remaining provisions. With the law's repeal, AAA's ban on considering AAA conferences in Arizona was lifted.

=== Engaging with the military ===
==== Vietnam War ====
In March 1967, during the Vietnam War, the Council of the AAA adopted a "Statement on Problems of Anthropological Research and Ethics" that stated:

... Except in the event of a declaration of war by Congress, academic institutions should not undertake activities or accept contracts in anthropology that are not related to their normal functions of teaching, research, and public service. They should not lend themselves to clandestine activities. ... The international reputation of anthropology has been damaged by the activities of unqualified individuals who have falsely claimed to be anthropologists, or who have pretended to be engaged in anthropological research while in fact pursuing other ends. There is also good reason to believe that some anthropologists have used their professional standing and the names of their academic institutions as cloaks for the collection of intelligence information and for intelligence operations. Academic institutions and individual members of the academic community, including students, should scrupulously avoid both involvement in clandestine intelligence activities and the use of the name of anthropology, or the title of anthropologist, as a cover for intelligence activities.

==== Human Terrain System ====
Through 2007 and 2008, debates surrounding anthropologists and the military resurfaced in response to the Pentagon's Human Terrain System (HTS) project. Following a number of national news articles on the project, anthropologists began to debate the project and related ethical issues. Proponents of the program argued that anthropologists were providing much-needed cultural knowledge about local populations and helping to decrease violence in their areas of operation. Critics, however, argued that HTS anthropologists could not receive informed consent from their research subjects in a war zone and that information provided by anthropologists might put populations in danger.

To address these issues, the Association's Executive Board released a statement on 31 October 2007. It cited "sufficiently troubling and urgent ethical issues" raised by the project, including the difficulties for HTS anthropologists to receive informed consent without coercion from their research subjects and to uphold their ethical mandate to "do no harm" to those they study. The AAA urged members to adhere to its code of ethics, which outlines principles and guidelines for ethical behavior. However, the association does not adjudicate cases involving charges of unethical behavior or bar members from participating in the HTS program.

In addition, the Association's Commission on the Engagement of Anthropology with US Security and Intelligence Communities (CEAUSSIC) issued a final report released during the AAA's 2007 annual meeting, based on over a year of work. It neither endorsed nor condemned anthropological work with military, intelligence and security organizations, but instead outlined the opportunities and challenges of working in these sectors. Opposition to military cooperation was evident during that meeting. Some critics of the HTS program have suggested that scholars who perform classified work with the military be expelled from the organization. During an event organized by the Network of Concerned Anthropologists, a graduate student who had recently been expelled from the HTS program spoke out about her experiences. She argued that the program was poorly run but was doing positive work in helping military officers with "nation-building" activities.

== AnthroSource ==
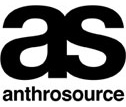

AnthroSource is the online repository of the journals of the American Anthropological Association. Launched in 2004, it contains current issues for fifteen of the Association's peer-reviewed publications, as well as an archive of the journals, newsletters, and bulletins published by the Association and its member sections. Members of the association receive access to AnthroSource as a benefit of membership, and institutions may receive access via paid subscription.

Until August 2007, AnthroSource was a collaboration between the University of California Press and the Association. It, along with all their journals, has since been removed from the University of California Press by the AAA Board and transferred to Wiley-Blackwell. Commencing 2008, AnthroSource was to be hosted and managed by Wiley-Blackwell as part of the five-year publishing contract awarded.

In 2013, the Association announced that it would experiment with making Cultural Anthropology an open-access journal; Brad Weiss, the society's president, said in a statement posted on the group's Web site, that "Starting with the first issue of 2014, CA will provide worldwide, instant, free (to the user), and permanent access to all of our content (as well as 10 years of our back catalog)," and that "Cultural Anthropology will be the first major, established, high-impact journal in anthropology to offer open access to all of its research"

== Presidents ==
AAA presidents have been drawn from all of the four subdisciplines of American anthropology: Until 2003 the presidents counted 46 socio-cultural anthropologists, 19 archeologists, six physical anthropologists and six linguists.

- William J McGee (1902–1904)
- F W Putnam (1905–1906)
- Franz Boas (1907–1908)
- W H Holmes (1909–1910)
- J Walter Fewkes (1911–1912)
- Roland B Dixon (1913–1914)
- F W Hodge (1915–1916)
- Alfred L. Kroeber (1917–1918)
- Clark Wissler (1919–1920)
- W. C. Farabee (1921–1922)
- Walter Hough (1923–1924)
- Ales Hrdlicka (1925–1926)
- Marshall H. Saville (1927–1928)
- Alfred M. Tozzer (1929–1930)
- George G. MacCurdy (1931)
- John R. Swanton (1932)
- Fay-Cooper Cole (1933–1934)
- Robert H. Lowie (1935)
- Herbert J. Spinden (1936)
- Nels C. Nelson (1937)
- Edward Sapir (1938)
- Diamond Jenness (1939)
- John M. Cooper (1940)
- Elsie Clews Parsons (1941)
- A.V. Kidder (1942)
- Leslie Spier (1943)
- Robert Redfield (1944)
- Neil M Judd (1945)
- Ralph Linton (1946)
- Ruth Benedict (Jan-May 1947)
- Clyde Kluckhohn (May-Dec 1947)
- Harry L. Shapiro (1948)
- A. Irving Hallowell (1949)
- Ralph L. Beals (1950)
- William W. Howells (1951)
- Wendell C. Bennett (1952)
- Fred R. Eggan (1953)
- John Otis Brew (1954)
- George P. Murdock (1955)
- Emil W. Haury (1956)
- E. Adamson Hoebel (1957)
- Harry Hoijer (1958)
- Sol Tax (1959)
- Margaret Mead (1960)
- Gordon R Willey (1961)
- Sherwood L. Washburn (1962)
- Morris E. Opler (1963)
- Leslie A. White (1964)
- Alexander Spoehr (1965)
- John P. Gillin (1966)
- Frederica de Laguna (1967)
- Irving Rouse (1968)
- Cora Du Bois (1969)
- George M. Foster Jr. (1970)
- Charles Wagley (1971)
- Anthony F. C. Wallace (1972)
- Joseph B. Casagrande (1973)
- Edward H. Spicer (1974)
- Ernestine Friedl (1975)
- Walter Goldschmidt (1976)
- Richard Newbold Adams (1977)
- Francis L. K. Hsu (1978)
- Paul J. Bohannan (1979)
- Conrad M. Arensberg (1980)
- William C Sturtevant (1981)
- M. Margaret Clark (1982)
- Dell Hathaway Hymes (1983)
- Nancy O. Lurie (1984–1985)
- June Helm (1986–1987)
- Roy Rappaport (1988–1989)
- Jane Buikstra (1989–1991)
- Annette Weiner (1991–1993)
- James Peacock (1993–1995)
- Yolanda T. Moses (1995–1997)
- Jane Hill (1997–1999)
- Louise Lamphere (1999–2001)
- Don Brenneis (2001–2003)
- Elizabeth M. Brumfiel (2003–2005)
- Alan H. Goodman (2005–2007)
- Setha Low (2007–2009)
- Virginia R. Domínguez (2009–2011)
- Leith Mullings (2011–2013)
- Monica Heller (2013–2015)
- Alisse Waterston (2015–2017)
- Alex Barker (2017–2019)
- Akhil Gupta (2019–2021)
- Ramona Pérez (2021–2023)
- Whitney Battle-Baptiste (2023–)
