= Lewis Deeney =

Scottish artist (born 1994)

- Born: 1994 (age 31–32); Dumbarton, Scotland
- Known for: Contemporary art
- Website: lewisdeeney.co.uk

Lewis Deeney (born 1994) is a Scottish artist known for his unique artistic style which combine expressive abstract painting with interlocking geometric forms. He often incorporates mandala symbolism into his work, blending them with modern, expressionist elements.

== Life and work ==
Born and raised in Dumbarton, Scotland. before studying Contemporary Art Practice at Duncan of Jordanstone College of Art & Design, graduating with Honors in 2020. The university of Dundee awarded Lewis the James Guthrie Orchar Memorial Prize and the Farquhar Reid Trust Prize during his degree show. in addition to be selected for the Freeland's Paintings Prize. Lewis continued his studies at Duncan of Jordanstone, graduating with an MFA in Art & Humanities 2021, during which the university purchased a painting for their public collection.

Lewis has since exhibited his work internationally, with notable solo exhibitions such as, An Odyssey of Chaos, 2023, at the Glasgow Art Club and his solo show The Sky is Dreaming, 2024, at the Fire Station Creative, Dunfermline. In 2024, Lewis represented Scotland at the Interceltique Festival in Lorient, France.
