= Robert Eadie =

British painter (1877–1954)

Robert Eadie R.S.W. (1877– 1 August 1954) was an elegant portraitist, book illustrator and painter of landscapes, beach and street scenes in oils and water-colours. He was also an engraver, and artist in black and white. Born in Glasgow in 1877 he served his apprenticeship in lithography allied with studies at Glasgow School of Art and in Munich and Paris. His work in oils, water-colour and black and white soon won attention and he became a regular exhibitor at the Royal Glasgow Institute of the Fine Arts and before 1914 at the Paris Salon

He also exhibited at the Royal Academy, London, the Royal Scottish Academy, Edinburgh and at the Royal Scottish Society of Painters in Watercolour, of which he was a member. He was prominent in civic life and was elected President of Glasgow Art Club.

Robert Eadie was an illustrator of books including publications for the Grant Educational Co Ltd in 1930, “The Face of Glasgow”, published in 1938, and “The Face of Edinburgh”, published in 1939. His paintings also preface "The University of Glasgow Library: Friendly Shelves" published in 2016. Further drawings are prominently used in "Glasgow's Blythswood" published in 2021.

An illustrated public catalogue of his work is maintained by the Romiley Arts Federation
