= Emilio Coia =

Scottish artist

Emilio Coia FRSE LLD (13 April 1911 in Glasgow – 17 June 1997 in Clydebank) was a Scottish artist who made his name in the early 1930s as a widely published caricaturist.

== Biography ==
Coia was born on 13 April 1911 in Glasgow. He was the son of Italian immigrant Giovanni Coia, a Glasgow ice-cream retailer, who trained him as an artist.

Educated at St Mungo's Academy and the Glasgow School of Art, he had a long period of work in advertising (before, during and after World War II), before returning to the newspaper business (initially in Glasgow), but later for the Edinburgh-published The Scotsman. This led to a long and mutually-beneficial association with the Edinburgh Festival.

Coia also contributed to the early days of Scottish Television; talking entertainingly on a wide range of subjects and producing caricatures and sketches on live and recorded TV programmes. He was widely and deservedly honoured and acclaimed for his work, and was elected President of Glasgow Art Club.

Coia married Marie Neale (died 1978).

He was elected a Fellow of the Royal Society of Edinburgh in 1984, his proposers included Sir Robin Philipson and Andrew Q Morton. He died in Clydebank on 17 June 1997.
