= Alan H. Goodman =

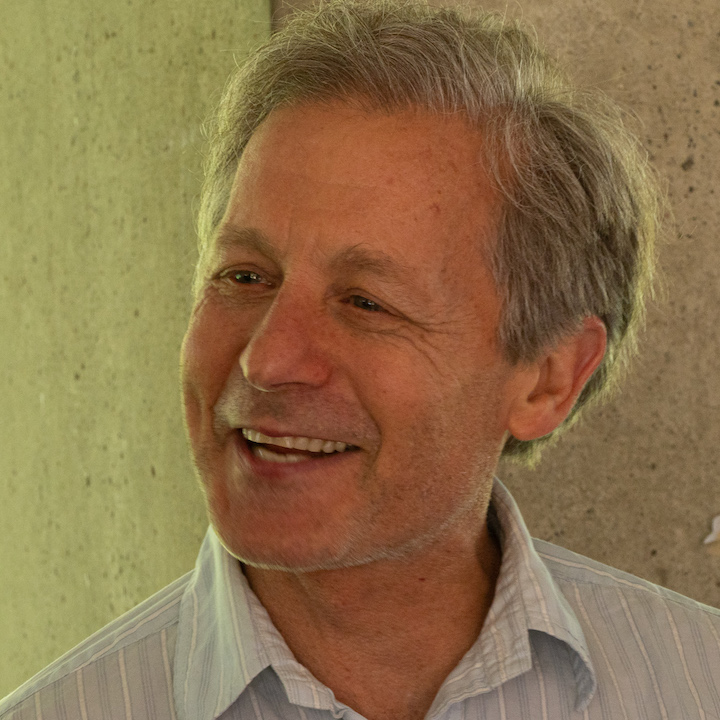
Alan H. Goodman, Biological Anthropologist & Author

Alan H. Goodman standing beside Margaret Mead, famous anthropologist

Alan H. Goodman is a biological anthropologist and author. He served as president of the American Anthropological Association from 2005 to 2007. With Yolanda Moses, he co-directs the American Anthropological Association's Public Education Project on Race. His teaching, research and writing focuses on understanding how poverty, inequality and racism “get under the skin.” He received his PhD from the University of Massachusetts Amherst. Goodman was a pre-doctoral research fellow in stress physiology at the Karolinska Institute, Stockholm and a postdoctoral fellow in international nutrition at the University of Connecticut and the Salvador Zubirán National Institute of Health Sciences and Nutrition, Mexico.

== Career ==
Goodman has been a professor of anthropology at Hampshire College since 1985. He is a former dean of the School of Natural Science, Vice President for Academic Affairs, and Dean of Faculty. He is a founding member of the Five College Consortium on "Culture, Health and Science " and currently teaches courses including “Human Variation: Race, Science, and Politics,” and “Sex, Death and Teeth: Life Stories Recorded in Teeth”, “Injustice and Health” and “Nutritional Anthropology.”

== Selected publications ==
=== Books ===
- Joseph L Graves and AH Goodman. (2021) Racism, Not Race: Answers to Frequently Asked Questions. Columbia University Press.
- AH Goodman, Y Moses, and JL Jones. (2012) Race: Are We So Different? Wiley-Blackwell.
- G. Ellison and A. Goodman (eds.) (2006) The Nature of Difference: Science, Society and Human Biology. Taylor and Francis, London.
- AH Goodman, D Heath and S Lindee (eds.), (2003) Genetic Nature/Culture: Anthropology and Science Beyond the Two-Culture Divide. University of California Press.
- AH Goodman, DL Dufour and G Pelto (eds.), (2000) Nutritional Anthropology: Biocultural Perspectives on Food and Nutrition. McGraw Hill, New York.
- AH Goodman and TL Leatherman (eds.), (1998) Building a New Biocultural Synthesis: Political-Economic Perspectives on Human Biology. University of Michigan Press.

=== Articles ===
- T Leatherman and AH Goodman. (2020) Building on the Biocultural Synthesis: 20 Years and Still Expanding. American Journal of Human Biology. 32:4.
- AH Goodman. (2013) Presidential Address: Bringing Culture into Human Biology and Biology Back into Anthropology. American Anthropologists. 115(3): 359–373.
- TL Leatherman and AH Goodman. (2005) Coca-Colonization of Diets in the Yucatán. Social Science and Medicine. 61:833-846.
- AE Dolphin, AH Goodman, and DD Amarasiriwardena. (2005) Variation in Elemental Intensities Among Teeth and Between Pre- and Postnatal Regions. American Journal of Physical Anthropology, 127: 878–888.
- AH Goodman. (2000) Why Genes Don't Count (for Racial Differences in Health). American Journal of Public Health 90(11): 1699–1702.
- AH Goodman. (1997) Bred in the Bone? The Sciences, March/April 20–25.
- AH Goodman, C Martinez, and A Chavez. (1991) Nutritional Supplementation and Enamel Developmental Defects in Children from Tezonteopan, Mexico. American Journal of Clinical Nutrition 53:773-81.
- AH Goodman and JC Rose. (1990) Assessment of Systemic Physiological Perturbations from Dental Enamel Hypoplasias and Associated Histological Structures. Yearbook of Physical Anthropology 33:59- 110.
- AH Goodman, RB Thomas, AC Swedlund, and GJ Armelagos. (1988) Biocultural Perspectives on Stress in Prehistoric, Historical, and Contemporary Population Research.] Yearbook of Physical Anthropology 31: 169–202.
- GJ Armelagos and AH Goodman. (1985) Disease and Death at Dr. Dickson's Mounds. Natural History (September 12–18).
