= Whitney Battle-Baptiste =

American archaeologist

- Education: Virginia State University; College of William and Mary; University of Texas at Austin
- Known for: Black feminist archaeology
- Scientific career
- Fields: Anthropology, archaeology
- Institutions: University of Massachusetts Amherst

Whitney Battle-Baptiste is an American historical archaeologist of African and Cherokee descent. She is an associate professor at the University of Massachusetts Amherst and director of the W.E.B. Du Bois Center at the University. Battle-Baptiste's research focuses on "how the intersection of race, gender, class, and sexuality look through an archaeological lens". She is also the president of American Anthropological Association.

Battle-Baptiste is currently working on "Rules of Engagement: Community-Based Archaeology as a Tool for Social Justice" (Left Coast Press). Her current research takes place on the Millars Plantation site on Eluethera island in the Bahamas, at a community-based archeology project. She focuses on the archeology of gender and race because “if people are being written about, archaeology can be used not only to fill the gaps, but to create alternative stories and histories."

== Early life and education ==
Battle-Baptiste grew up in the Bronx borough of New York City and was exposed to history through her mother, who taught on Long Island. She attended Virginia State University, an HBCU in Petersburg, with the same goal, then earned her master's degree in history at The College of William and Mary. At a summer internship, she met several African-American women who were archaeologists, and this sparked her interest in the subject.

She pursued her Ph.D. at the University of Texas at Austin in the African Diaspora program in anthropology, and focused her studies on archaeology through the lens of race and gender. Her dissertation, titled “A Yard to Sweep: Race, Gender and the Enslaved Landscape” was published in 2004 and based on her research at Andrew Jackson's Tennessee plantation, The Hermitage. It explores the gender power dynamics in captive African domestic areas.

== Career ==
Battle-Baptiste has participated in archaeological excavations at Colonial Williamsburg, The Hermitage, the Rich Neck Plantation in Virginia the W.E.B. Du Bois Boyhood Homesite in Great Barrington, Massachusetts and the Millars Plantation on the Bahamian island of Eleuthera. Battle-Baptiste was named the new Director of W.E.B. Du Bois Center at UMass Amherst in January 2015. "The W.E.B. Du Bois Center at the UMass Amherst Libraries was established in 2009 to engage the nation and the world in discussion and scholarship about the global issues involving race, labor and social justice."

She became president of the American Anthropological Association for the 2023-2025 term. She was chosen as Archaeological Institute of America Norton Lecturer for the 2024/2025 National Lecture Program season.

== Degrees ==
- Ph.D., Department of Anthropology, University of Texas at Austin, 2004
- M.A., Department of History, College of William and Mary, 2000
- B.A., Departments of History and Secondary Education, Virginia State University, 1994

== Selected publications ==
- Battle-Baptiste, Whitney; and Rusert, Britt (eds.) (2019). W. E. B. Du Bois’s Data Portraits: Visualizing Black America. Princeton Architectural Press. ISBN 978-1-61689-706-2.
- Battle-Baptiste, Whitney (2011). Black Feminist Archaeology. Left Coast Press. ISBN 978-1-59874-379-1.
- Battle-Baptiste, Whitney, (2011), "In this here place: Interpreting Enslaved Homeplaces", In: A. Ogundiran, T. Falola (eds.), Archaeology of Atlantic Africa and the African Diaspora. Indiana University Press, pp. 233–248. ISBN 978-0-253-22175-9.
- Battle-Baptiste, Whitney, (2010), "Sweepin' Spirits: Power and Transformation on the Plantation Landscape", In: A. Sherene Baugher and Suzanne M. Spencer-Wood (eds.), Archaeology and Preservation of Gendered Landscapes. Springer Press, pp. 81–94. ISBN 978-1-4419-1500-9.
- Battle-Baptiste, Whitney, (2004), "A Space of Our Own: Redefining the Enslaved Household at Andrew Jackson's Hermitage Plantation", In: K. Barile, J. Brandon (eds.), In Household Chores and Household Choices: Theorizing the Domestic Sphere in Historical Archaeology. University of Alabama Press, pp. 33–50. ISBN 978-0-817-35098-7.
