= R & J Beck =

- Industry: Manufacturing
- Founded: 1843 in London, England
- Founder: Richard Beck; Joseph Beck
- Products: Photography equipment

R & J Beck was an optical manufacturing enterprise established in 1843 by brothers Richard Beck (1827–1866) and Joseph Beck FRAS, FRMS (June 1828 – 18 April 1891). The firm operated from its headquarters located at 69 Mortimer Street in London. James Smith, worked with the company for a time, until his retirement in 1865. Smith's tenure is notably recognised for his instrumental role in elevating the significance of microscopes in scientific research circles.

== History ==
Richard Beck (1827–1866) and Joseph Beck FRAS, FRMS (June 1828 – 18 April 1891) (nephews of J. J. Lister) formed the optical manufacturing firm of R and J Beck in 1843, based at 69 Mortimer Street, London. James Smith worked with the company under the name Smith and Beck, renamed Smith, Beck and Beck in 1854 but reverted to R and J Beck when Smith retired in 1865. Smith is credited with helping to raise the status of the use of microscopes within scientific research.

== Exhibitions and trades shows ==
- 1851 Great Exhibition

== Notable equipment ==
Camera lenses of R and J Beck are known as Beck Ensign, and the Frena camera was developed in the 1890s, using celluloid films.

A catalogue of work by R & J Beck from 1900 has been digitised as part of the Internet Archive which features the terms of business and pricing from 1900, simplex microscopes, No. 10 London Microscope, No. 22 London Microscope, No. 29 London Microscope, Beck Pathological Microscope, No. 3201 Massive Microscope, Radial Research Microscope, Angular Model Microscope, Beck Combined Binocular and Monocular Microscope, Baby London Microscope, No.3755 Portable Microscope, Pathological Microscope, Binomax magnifier, Greenough Binocular Microscope, Crescent Dissecting Microscope, Cornex Dissecting Microscope, Beck Ultra Violet Microscope made for J. E. Barnard F.R.S., Beck Object Glasses, Eyepieces, Beck-Chapman Opaque Illuminator, Photomigraphic Cameras, Optical Benches, Microtomes, University Micro-projector and Folding Pocket Magnifiers.

== Museums and Collections holding R and J Beck equipment ==
- Coats Observatory, Paisley, Scotland (contains a large collection of scientific and astronomical materials, including equipment by R and J Beck)
- National Museums of Scotland (microscopes by R and J Beck)
- National Science and Media Museum, Bradford, England (Beck field cameras)
- Science Museum, London (compound molecular microscope, acquired 2012, periscope for trench use)
- Museum of Technology, Lincolnshire (microscopes)
- Museum of the History of Science, Oxford (microscopes)
- Warren Anatomical Museum, Harvard (classroom demonstration microscopes)
- Hunterian Museum, Glasgow, Scotland (microscopes)
- Surgeons' Hall Museum, Edinburgh, Scotland (microscope)
- Scientific Instrument Collection, Macleay Museum, Sydney University (vertical illuminator)
- London School of Hygiene & Tropical Medicine Archives, London (crescent dissecting microscope, c.1900)
- Queen Victoria Museum and Art Gallery, Launceston, Tasmania, Australia (binocular microscope, 1865)

== Slideshow: Images of R and J Beck equipment ==
From the Coats Observatory collection:

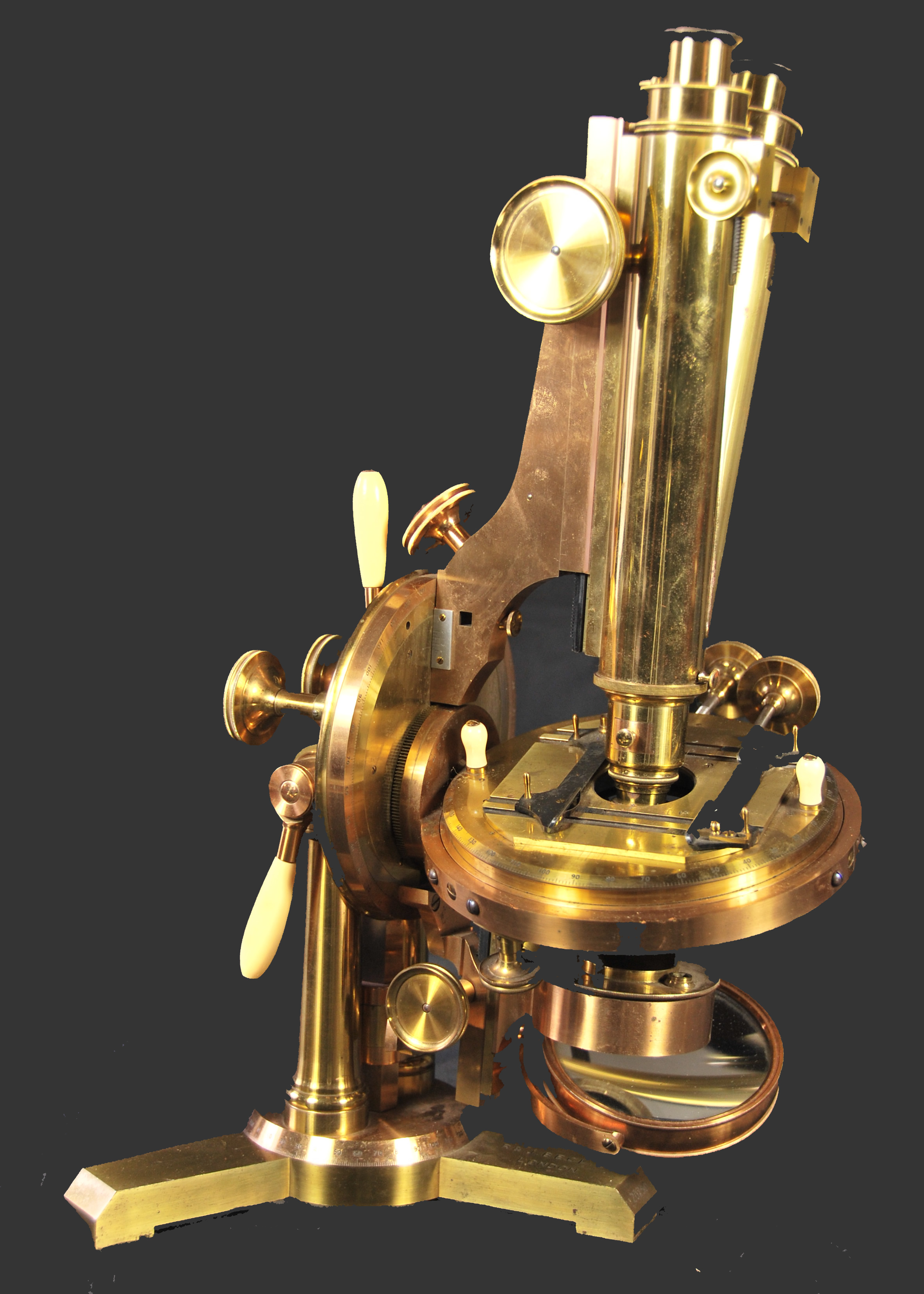

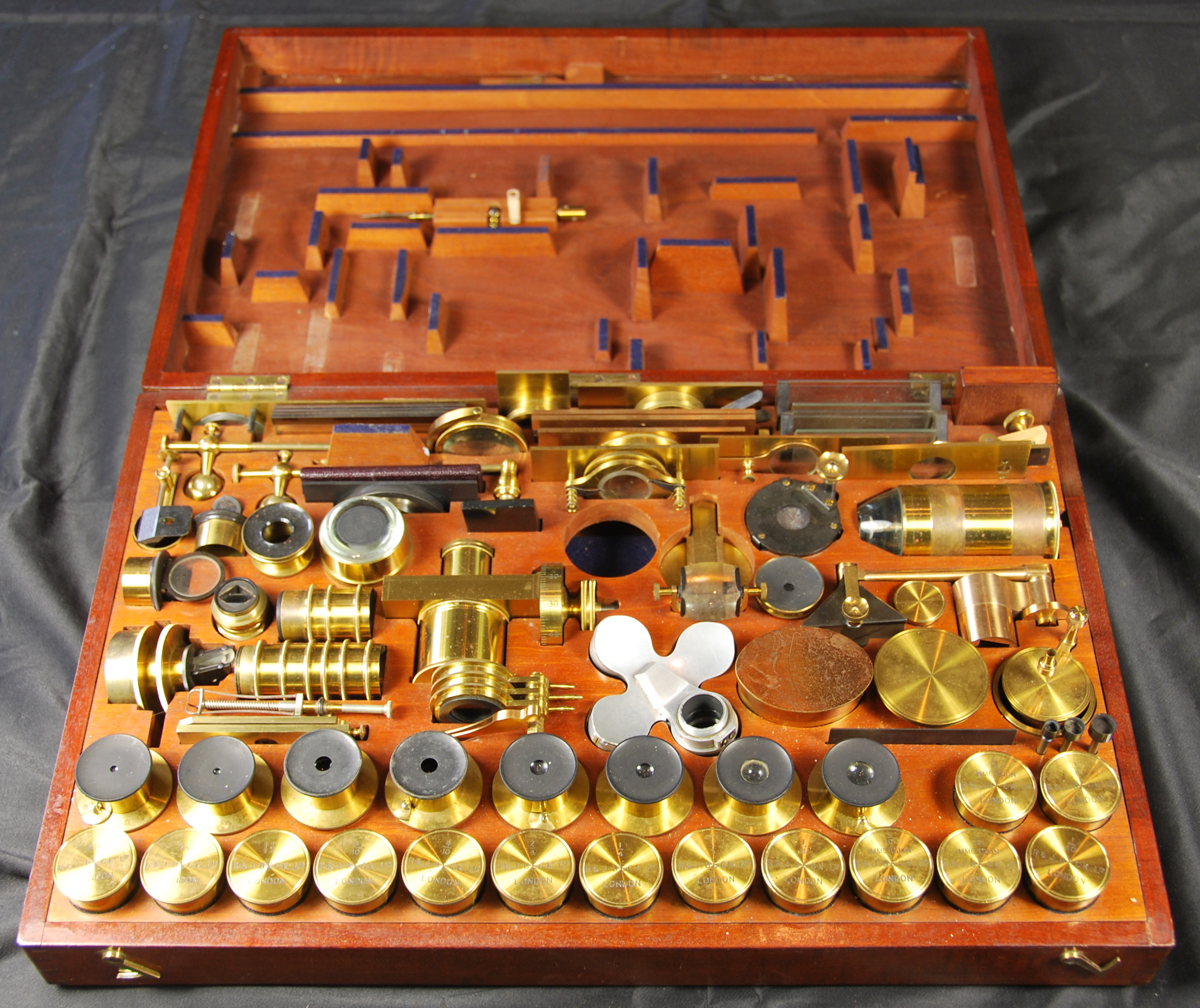

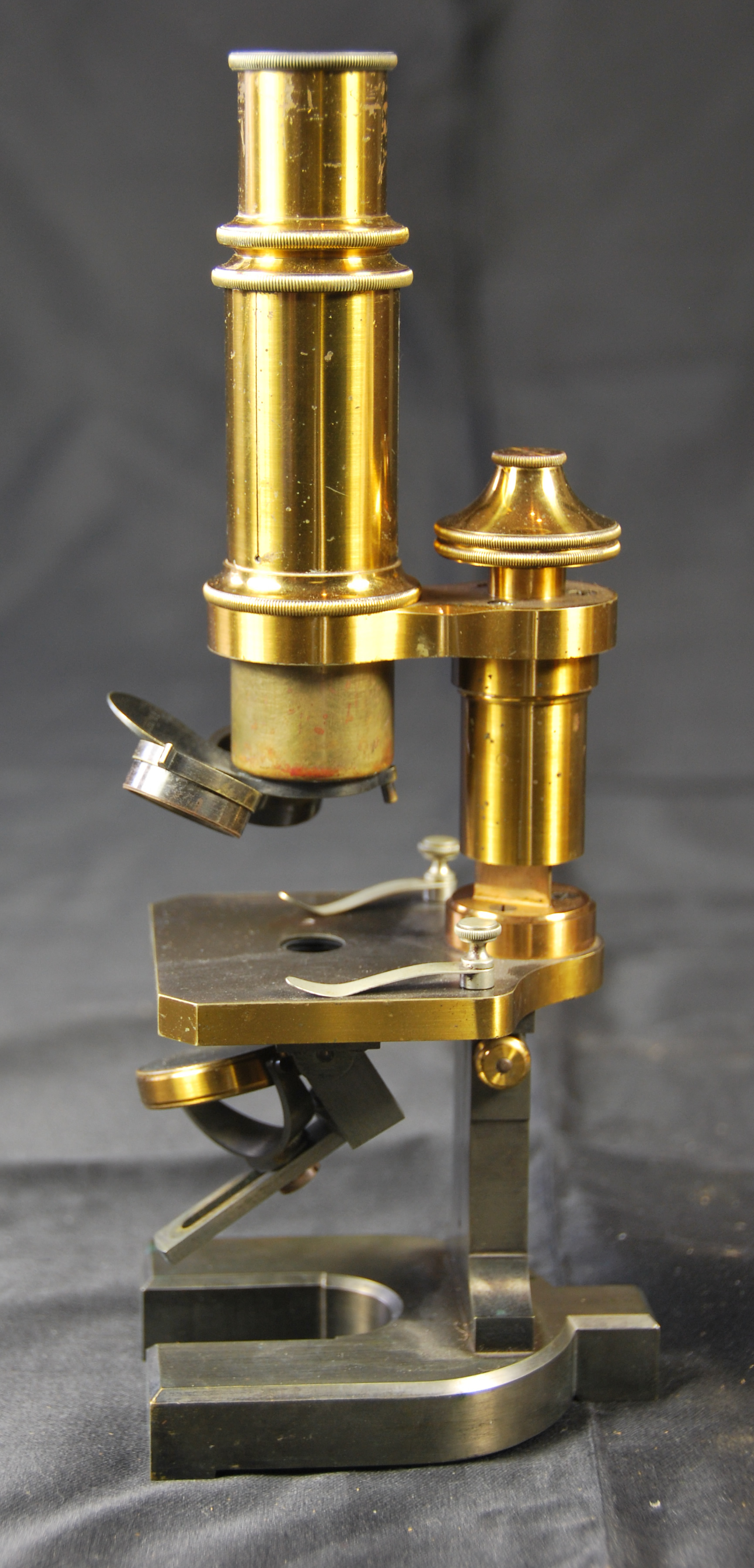
