= Morris Young (entomologist) =

Scottish naturalist and entomologist

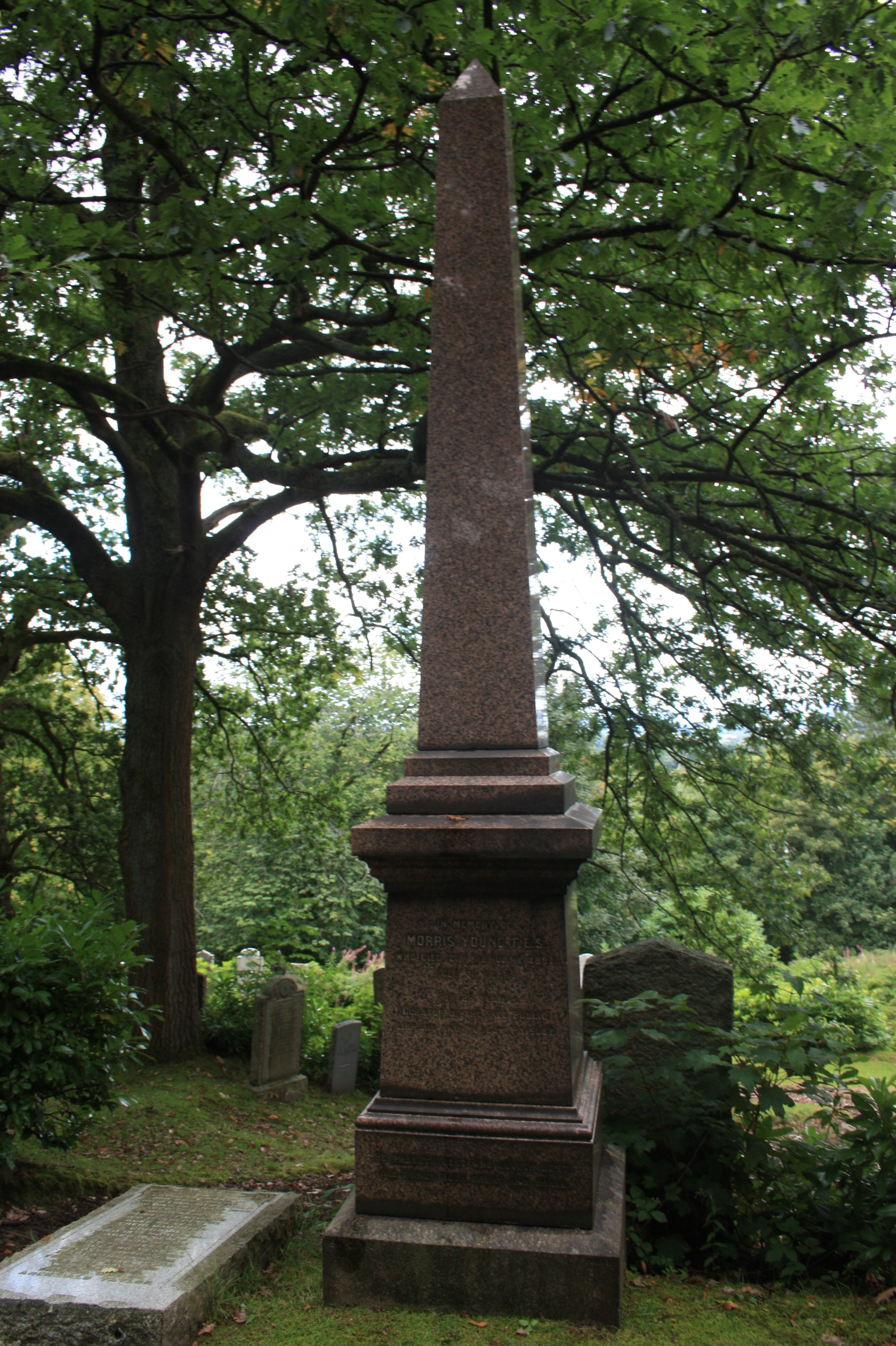
The grave of Morris Young, Woodside Cemetery, Paisley

Morris Young FES (1822–1897) was a Scottish naturalist and entomologist. He was the first curator of Paisley Free Library and Museum. Although his main interest was in Entomology, and in particular the rove beetles of the family Staphylinidae, he was however very knowledgeable in most branches of natural history as well as being a skilled illustrator and taxidermist. Before being appointed as curator of the museum he was a schoolmaster in Paisley. In the period before the opening of the Museum in 1871 he coordinated the collection of over 2000 beetle specimens as well as many hundreds of other insects and spiders, as Convener of the Entomology section of the Paisley Philosophical Institution. These collections were added to during the 25 years he was in post as Curator, and they are still in their original cases. During the Second World War Andrew Rodger Waterston worked on these collections.

Young died on 26 February 1897 and is buried on the upper northern slopes of Woodside Cemetery in western Paisley.

He bequeathed the sum of £500 to the Museum for the upkeep of the entomological collections, and for his books.
