= Glasgow Art Club =

Arts club in Glasgow, Scotland

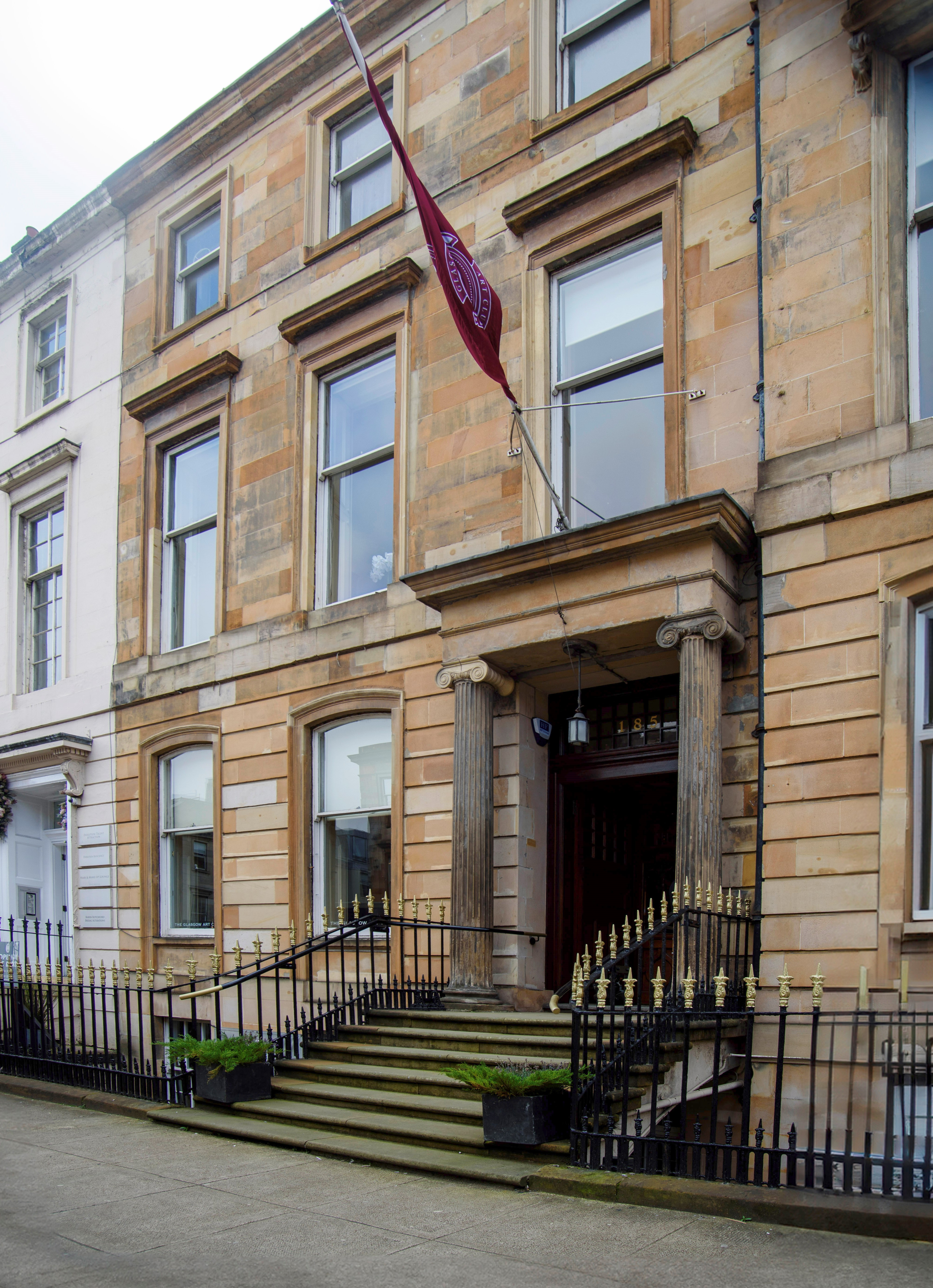
- Type: The Arts
- Headquarters: Glasgow, Scotland
- Location: 185 Bath Street, Glasgow G2 4HU
- Coordinates: 55.8645°N 4.2626°W
- President: Philip Raskin
- Website: www.glasgowartclub.co.uk

Situated in a major category A-listed building, Glasgow Art Club is a club in Glasgow for artists and non-artists interested in creating art and in the enjoyment of art - all illustrative arts, sculptures, poetry, prose, plays, music, song, choreography and dance. To advance, promote and encourage the arts in all forms. It has ranges of exhibitions, events and concerts, open to the public for their enjoyment; and the Galleries and a number of rooms are available as venues for social occasions.

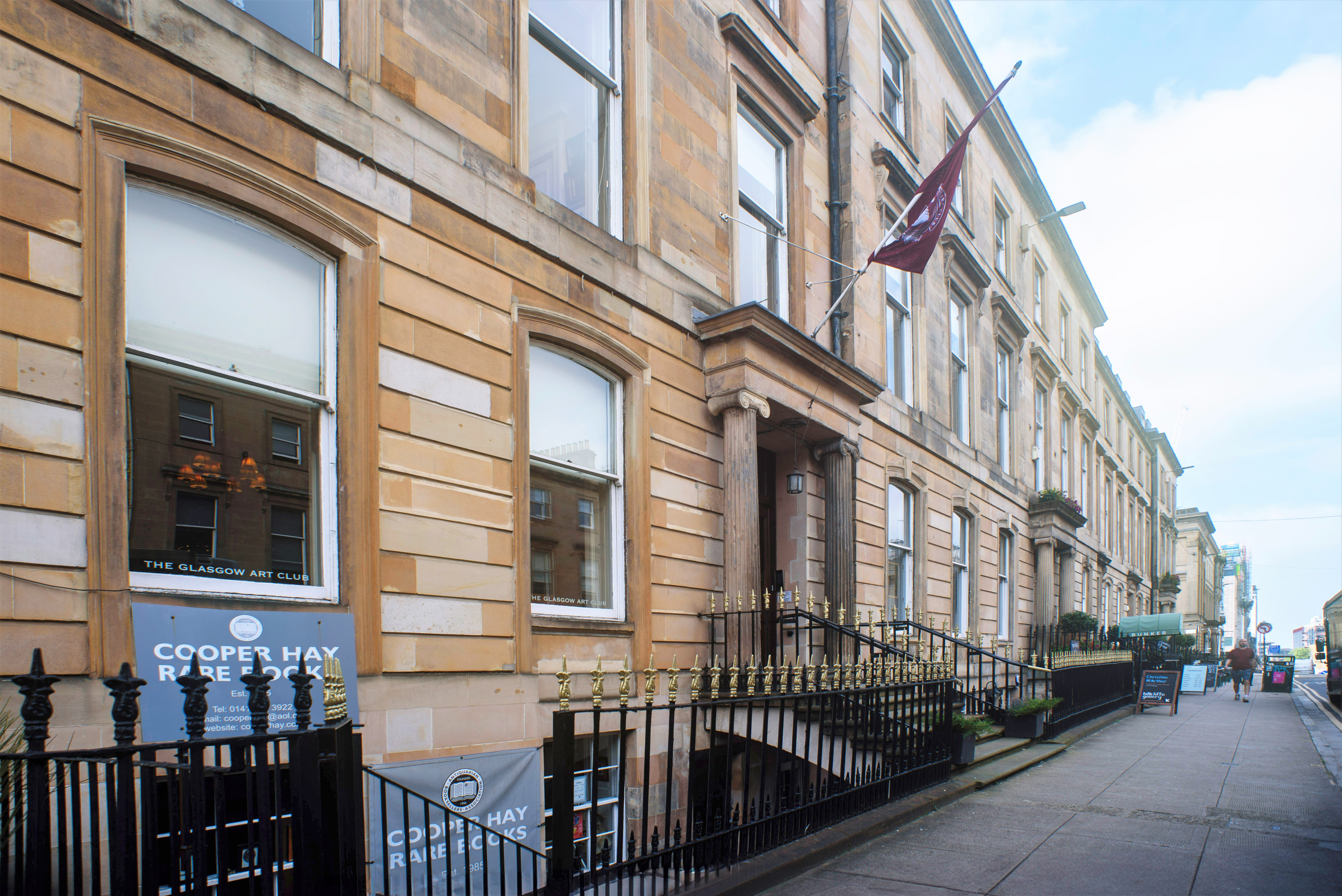
Glasgow Art Club west along Bath Street

It is the performance venue of Westbourne Music and its regular series of Wednesday lunch-time concerts.

It is also now the home-base of Paisley Art Institute which was established in Paisley in 1876 and continues to have exhibitions, workshops and events in the promotion of art for all.

== Overview and premises ==
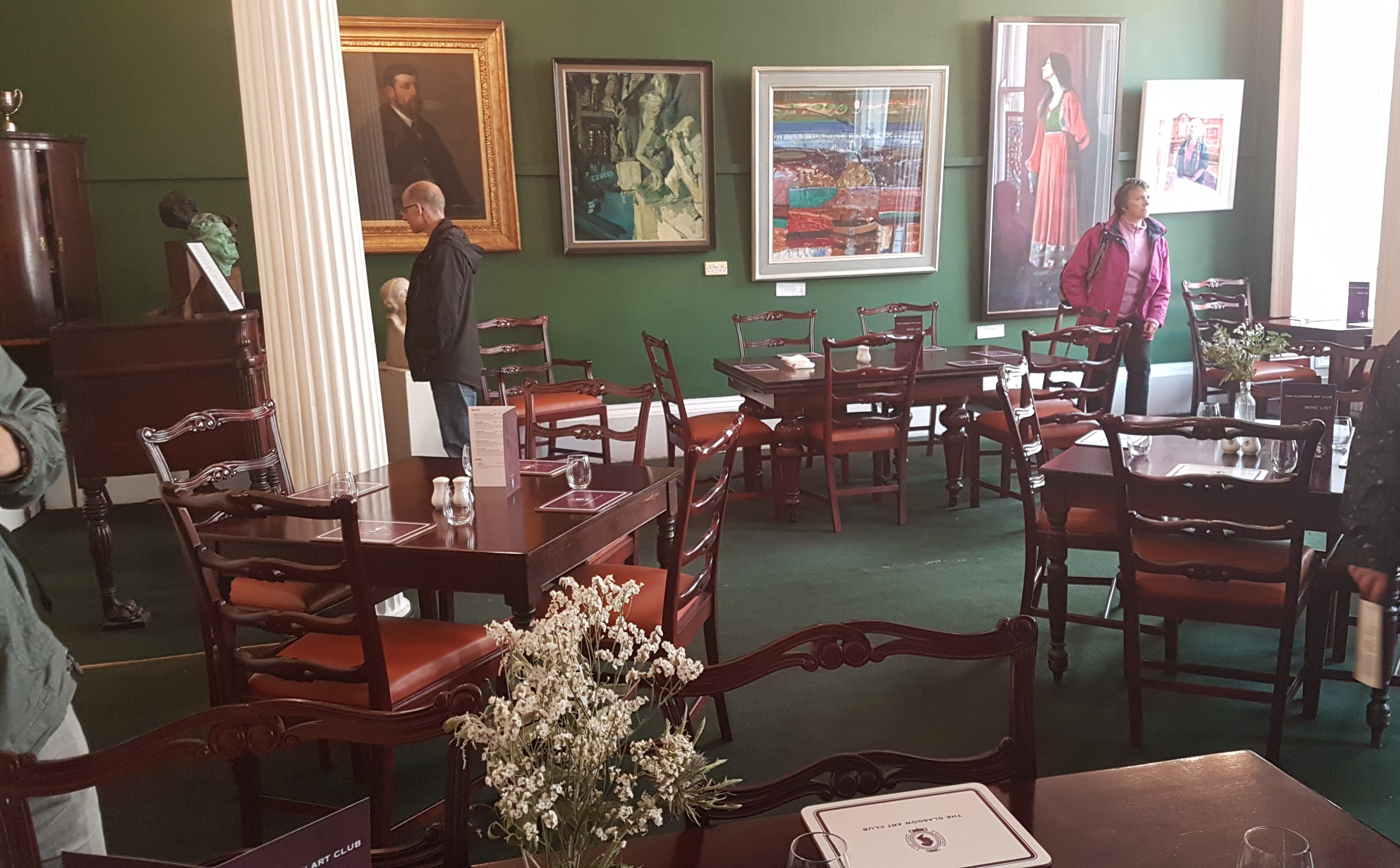
Ground floor dining room

One of Glasgow and Scotland's most creative institutions, Glasgow Art Club has charity status and was founded in 1867. Annual membership is open to ladies, gentlemen, students and corporate organisations. The club premises include function rooms, studios, library, dining room and Gallery. Extensive exhibitions and events are programmed each year. It is based at 185 Bath Street close to Blythswood Square.

== History ==
Following initial discussions by artists William Dennistoun, {Sir} David Murray and friends at a tea room above a baker's shop in Candleriggs, Glasgow, on the proposal to form a club, the first formal meetings of the club were held at the Waverley Temperance Hotel, on Buchanan Street, Glasgow, with Dennistoun elected the club's first president. Membership was to grow during the 1870s, with more artists joining and exhibitions being held and in 1875 the club moved to another hotel called the Waverley, this time one on the city's Sauchiehall Street. From there the club was to relocate to the Royal Hotel on the city's George Square, renting rooms for six months at a time, where life and sketching classes were held.

Membership of the club began to be extended beyond painters (in 1881 the pioneering photographer James Craig Annan was admitted as a ‘'photographic artist'’ and in 1903 John M. Crawford (another former pupil of Hamilton Academy), Fellow of the Royal Institute of British Architects, became the first architect to be elected President of Glasgow Art Club.)

In 1878 the club moved to rented premises at 62 Bothwell Street and the need to raise funds led to a change in the club’s constitution and the admission in 1886 of male lay members with an interest in the arts (women could be guests, but membership admission of women was not extended until 1982). With membership burgeoning, new premises were rented at 151 Bath Street on Blythswood Hill, originally developed by William Harley in the early 19th century. These formally opened on 12 November 1886 but soon afterwards two adjacent townhouses at 185 Bath Street were purchased, these converted by the architect John Keppie, a member of the club, also creating an extensive exhibition gallery on what were the back gardens of the houses. The young architect Charles Rennie Mackintosh was involved in the decorative details of the Gallery. The club's new premises were formally opened on 14 June 1893 (in the same period the Glasgow Society of Lady Artists was formed, and came to be based nearby, opening the Lady Artists' Club, at 5 Blythswood Square).

In 2011, the club undertook and completed a major programme of renovation of its historic category A Listed building on Bath Street. including the restoration of the Gallery frieze designed by Charles Rennie Mackintosh, who assisted John Keppie and John Honeyman in the design of the Gallery saloon.

The club has a range of memberships for all ages. It first admitted women as members in 1984, electing its first female president, Efric McNeil, in 2015. In 2022, Westbourne Music moved their base to the Club for public lunchtime mid-week concerts, and continue there. There is a long established association with Paisley Art Institute, founded in 1876, and the Institute's major Annual Open Exhibition is held in the club each Spring.

== Exhibitions and notable exhibitors ==
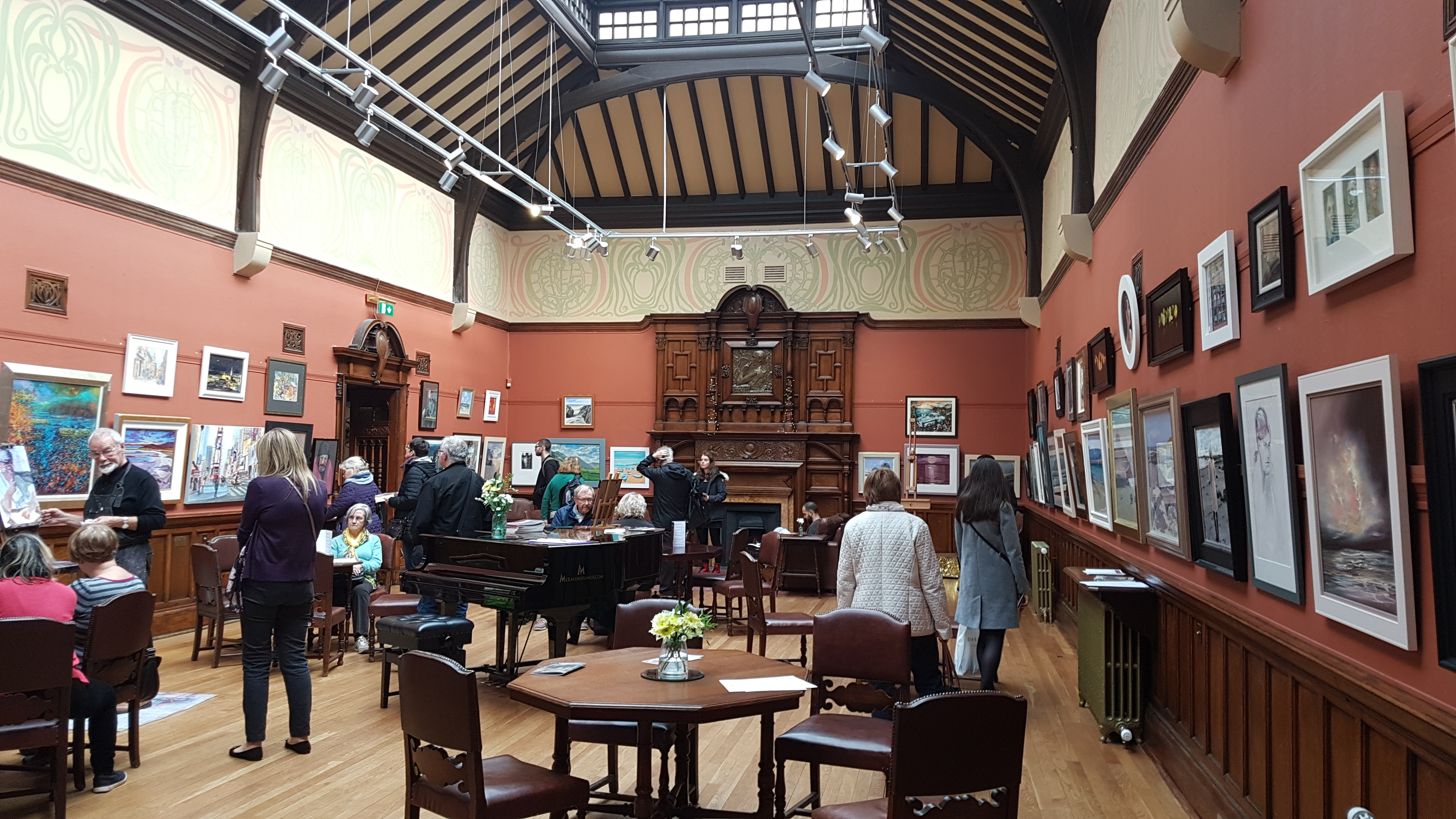
The ground floor gallery space features a frieze by Charles Rennie Mackintosh

The club’s stature in Glasgow was confirmed when on the occasion of the official opening by the Prince of Wales of the Glasgow International Exhibition of Science, Art and Industry in 1888, the Lord Provost of Glasgow presented the Prince and Princess of Wales with an album of paintings by members of the Glasgow Art Club. In the succeeding years the club has played host to many events, including, on the evening of 28 October 1932 a dinner honouring Dr. Pittendrigh Macgillivray RSA, King’s Sculptor in Ordinary for Scotland a member of the Club for some fifty years, and club member James B. Anderson ARSA.

Initially the Club’s exhibitions were open only to members, in later years admission extended also to the general public. In 2008 Glasgow Art Club exhibited the jewelled panel The White Rose and The Red Rose by Margaret Macdonald Mackintosh, wife of Charles Rennie Mackintosh, before its sale for £1.7 million at Christie's on 30 April 2008. Since 2010 the club has opened its exhibition spaces and collections to the public on a regular basis (i.e. not just when specific exhibitions are being held.)

Many notable member artists have exhibited at the club's exhibitions, including:

The club's Winter exhibition of 1909 included works by: Sir James Guthrie, E A Hornel, Muirhead Bone (Britain's first official War Artist, knighted 1937) Sir David Murray RA. The club's Spring exhibition of 1923 included works by: E A Hornel, Sir David Murray RA, and James Kay. The club's Memorial Exhibition of 1935 included works by: E A Walton, Sir James Guthrie, W Y Macgregor, James Paterson, Maurice William Greiffenhagen, Leslie Hunter, Stuart Park, E A Hornel. The club's exhibition April 1939 included works by: Sir John Lavery (exhibiting his The Lake at Ranelagh,) and J W Ferguson, who submitted a portrait.

The Club hosts four exhibitions of members' works each year, and are open to the public; and also touring exhibitions. Together with the Annual Open Exhibitions of Paisley Art Institute.

== Notable members ==
Notable members include:

- James B. Anderson ARSA
- James Craig Annan
- Muriel Barclay
- George Telfer Bear
- Sir Muirhead Bone
- Alexander Kellock Brown
- Emilio Coia
- William Crosbie
- John Cunningham
- Peter Wylie Davidson
- George Devlin
- David Donaldson RSA RGI RP LLD DLit Painter and Limner to Her Majesty The Queen in Scotland
- Robert Eadie
- Norman Edgar
- Lewis Deeney
- J W Ferguson
- William Gallacher
- Alexander Goudie
- Robert Greenlees
- Maurice William Greiffenhagen
- Sir James Guthrie
- Ernest B Hood
- Norman Kirkham
- Sir David Murray RA
- Dr Tom Honeyman
- E A Hornel
- Leslie Hunter
- James Kay
- Robert Kelsey
- Sir John Lavery
- Lord Macfarlane of Bearsden
- John McGhie
- Archibald A McGlashan
- Neil MacPhail
- Allan D Mainds ARSA
- O.H. Mavor James Bridie
- Sir David Murray RA
- Stuart Park
- A N Paterson
- James Paterson
- Sir Francis Powell
- Alexander Proudfoot
- Benno Schotz, Sculptor in Ordinary for Scotland
- Connie Simmers
- George Singleton
- William Somerville Shanks
- Archibald Macfarlane Shannan
- A P Thomson
- Murray Macpherson Tod
- E A Walton

== Additional sources ==
- Glasgow Art Club 1867 -1967, the First Hundred Years Glasgow Art Club 1967
- The Year’s Art 1890: A Concise Epitome of all Matters Relating to the Arts of Painting, Sculpture and Architecture which have occurred during the year 1889, together with information respecting the events of the year 1890 page 158
