= Monica Heller =

Canadian linguist (born 1955)

Monica Heller (born June 1955) is a Canadian linguistic anthropologist and professor at the University of Toronto. She was the president of the American Anthropological Association (AAA) from 2013 to 2015.

== Biography ==
Heller was born in 1955, in Montreal, Quebec. Her father was a neurologist and her mother a medical sociologist. The political meanings of the uses of French and English in Quebec in the 1960s led to her interest in language and its influence on society. She attended Swarthmore College in Swarthmore, Pennsylvania, graduating with a Bachelor of Arts in Sociology and Anthropology (minor in Linguistics) with honors in 1976. She earned her Ph.D. in Linguistics at the University of California, Berkeley, in 1982.

== Academic career ==
Currently she is Full Professor at the University of Toronto's Ontario Institute for Studies in Education (OISE) in the department of Humanities, Social Sciences & Social Justice Education with a joint appointment to the Department of Anthropology. Her research has focused on the role of language in the construction of social difference and social inequality, especially francophone Canada, and comparative work in Western Europe. Using a political economy approach, she has tracked shifts in ideologies of language, nation and State, and examined processes of linguistic commodification in the globalized economy, along with the emergence of post-national ideologies of language and identity.

She has been a visiting professor at universities in Brazil, Belgium, Germany, France, Spain and Finland, and a fellow of Freiburg Institute for Advanced Studies at the Albert-Ludwigs-Universität Freiburg in Germany . She also has a nominal appointment in the Département d’études françaises of the Université de Moncton. From 2007 to 2012, she served as associate editor for the Journal of Sociolinguistics.

== American Anthropological Association ==
Heller was executive program chair for the 2010 annual meetings of the American Anthropological Association in New Orleans. She served as vice president of the association for 2011–2013. In November 2013, she became president. She is one of the few scholars at a non-U.S. institution to lead the AAA in the organization's history.

== Honors and awards ==
- 1998 Connaught Research Fellowship, University of Toronto
- 2001 Konrad Adenauer Research Award, Alexander von Humboldt-Stiftung (Germany)
- 2001 Member, official delegation, State Visit of the Governor-General of Canada to Germany
- 2005–present Member, Royal Society of Canada
- 2011 President’s Award, American Anthropological Association

== Books ==
- 1988 (ed.) Codeswitching: Anthropological and Sociolinguistic Perspectives, Berlin: Mouton de Gruyter. ISBN 978-3-11-011376-1
- 1994 Crosswords: Language, Ethnicity and Education in French Ontario. Berlin: Mouton de Gruyter. ISBN 978-3-11-088594-1
- 2001 Voices of Authority: Education and Linguistic Difference. Westport CT: Ablex. Monica Heller and Marilyn Martin-Jones
- 2002, 2023 Éléments d’une sociolinguistique critique. Paris: Didier. ISBN 978-2-278-05302-5 noew edition : Paris: ENS Editions
- 2003 Discours et identités : la francité canadienne entre modernité et mondialisation (with Normand Labrie) Cortil-Wodon [Belgique] : Editions modulaires européennes : InterCommunications. ISBN 978-2-930342-35-1
- 2006 Linguistic Minorities and Modernity: A Sociolinguistic Ethnography(2nd edition). London: Continuum ISBN 978-1-4411-0525-7 According to WorldCat, the book is held in 710 libraries (First edition 1999, London: Longman. ISBN 978-0-582-27948-3)
- 2007 (ed.) Bilingualism: A Social Approach. London: Palgrave Macmillan. ISBN 978-1-4039-9678-7
- 2007 Discourses of Endangerment: Ideology and Interest in the Defense of Languages. (with Alexandre Duchêne) London: Continuum. ISBN 978-1-84706-322-9 According to WorldCat, the book is held in 688 libraries
- 2011 Paths to Postnationalism: A Critical Ethnography of Language and Identity. Oxford: Oxford University Press. Monica Heller, with Mark Campbell, Phyllis Dalley, and Donna Patrick ISBN 978-0-19-974686-6
- 2012 (ed.) Language in Late Capitalism: Pride and Profit. (with Alexandre Duchêne) London: Routledge. ISBN 978-0-415-88859-2
