= Paisley Museum and Art Galleries =

Museum in Paisley, Scotland

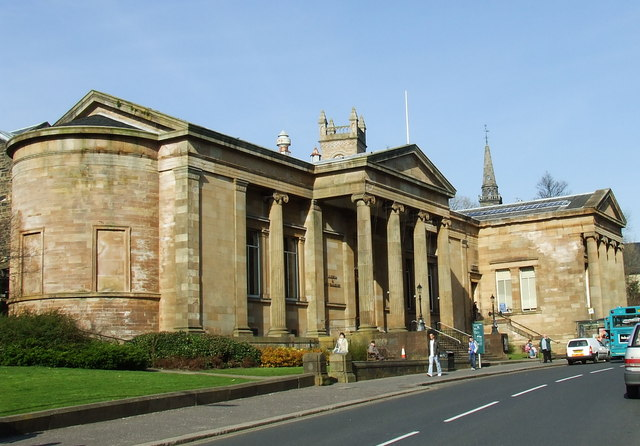
- Established: 1871
- Location: High Street, Paisley, Renfrewshire, PA1 2BA
- Coordinates: 55.8453°N 4.4303°W
- Website: www.renfrewshireleisure.com/paisleymuseum/

Paisley Museum and Art Galleries is a museum in Paisley, Scotland. It is currently closed for refurbishment and is due to reopen in 2026 only with the title of Paisley Museum. It is located in the town of Paisley and is run by Renfrewshire Council. When it had art galleries, six in total, it housed one of the largest municipal art collections in Scotland, including over 800 paintings.

The Museum and Art Galleries were gifted to the town of Paisley by the thread-making industrialist Sir Peter Coats in 1871. The building, which also houses Paisley Library and the Coats Observatory, was designed by Glasgow architect John Honeyman of the firm of Honeyman and Keppie. The first curator of the Museum was the entomologist Morris Young who remained in post until his death in 1897 leaving the Museum a bequest of £500 to be invested and the returns used to pay for the upkeep of the entomological collections and all his books. The museum has been extended on several occasions since it opened. In 2017 plans were announced for a revamp of the Museum to transform it into an "international-class destination" based around Paisley's heritage story.

The art collection displayed over many years, including the large art collection owned by Paisley Art Institute has concentrated largely on works by late nineteenth-century and early twentieth-century Scottish artists, such as the Glasgow School and the Scottish Colourists.In addition a contemporary collection was made which includes work by artists such as Steven Campbell and John Byrne, who was born in Paisley.

The museum houses a collection of objects and documents covering the local and international history of Paisley and Renfrewshire, especially the importance of the textiles and thread-making industry, tracing the history of the luxury shawl industry which developed in Paisley. The museum has recreated the work and a weaving using a traditional hand loom can be seen on site It also contains an archaeological collection which includes objects from Ancient Egypt and Babylon and an extensive natural history collection, the museum also houses the local biological records centre.

One of the most important items in the Museum's collection is the Arbuthnott Missal which was presented to the Museum by another of the Coats family, Archibald. This missal is the only extant pre Reformation missal (liturgical book) of the Scottish Use and in 2007 it was awarded a prestigious top award in the British Library's Hidden Treasures Brought to Life competition.

The museum is currently closed to the public. In August 2025 Renfrewshire Council stated that they expected to re-open as Paisley Museum in the second half of 2026. Work on the building finished in February 2026. In September 2026 Renfrewshire Council announced that reopening was due to take place at the start of 2027.

== See also ==
- List of museums in Scotland
