= M. Margaret Clark =

American medical anthropologist

- Born: Mary Margaret Clark; January 9, 1925; Amarillo, Texas, US
- Died: January 23, 2003 (aged 78); San Rafael, California, US
- Scientific career
- Fields: Medical anthropology
- Institutions: Southern Methodist University (1941–1945); Southwestern Medical School (1945–1948); University of California, Berkeley (1948–1957); University of California, San Francisco (1960–1991)
- Thesis: Sickness and health in Sal si Puedes; Mexican-Americans in a California community
- Doctoral advisor: George M. Foster

Mary Margaret Clark (1925–2003) was an American medical anthropologist who is credited with founding the sub-discipline of medical anthropology.

== Life ==
M. Margaret Clark was born on January 9, 1925, in Amarillo, Texas. After receiving a doctorate degree in anthropology from University of California, Berkeley, she was employed as a researcher by the U.S. Public Health Service, where she worked on public health-related projects in Colorado. She also worked as a consultant for various agencies directed towards health and aging. Dr. Clark later earned a Professor Emerita position at University of California, San Francisco where she taught medical anthropology through a joint graduate program she created. She retired from her position in 1991, after which she took courses at the Fromm Institute at the University of San Francisco. Dr. Clark died of a heart attack on January 23, 2003, aged 78. She was living in San Rafael, California, at the time of her death.

=== Positions ===
Throughout her career, Clark served in various societies and associations, including the following:

- President of the Society for Medical Anthropology(1972–1973)
- Vice president (1974–1975) and Executive Councillor (1973–1976) for the Gerontological Society of America
- Executive Board member of the Society for Applied Anthropology (1974–1977)
- Section H Executive Committee of the American Association for the Advancement of Science(1977–1981)
- President (1981–1982) and executive board member (1974–1977) of the American Anthropological Association
- Member of International Union of Anthropological and Ethnological Sciences

== Education ==
Clark earned a bachelor's degree in chemistry from Southern Methodist University, and entered Southwestern Medical School at the age of 20. After three years of medical school, she left to pursue anthropology as a graduate student at UC Berkeley. Clark completed her doctorate in anthropology in 1957 at Berkeley under the advisement of George Foster. Her dissertation was “Sickness and health in Sal si Puedes; Mexican-Americans in a California community,” which she completed in San Jose, California on the community Sal si Puedes and was published in 1959.

== Research ==
In her research, Clark explores the effects of cultural practices through experiments, field studies, interviews, and literature on oral traditions. Her book, Health in the Mexican-American Culture: A Community Study, focuses on the socio-cultural constructs of the Sal si Puedes group and their aversion and mistrust towards modern health practices. The work concludes with recommendations to social workers on how to engage with such groups in light of their beliefs. Another of Clark's books, Culture and Aging: An Anthropological Study of Older Americans, reveals the decline in status of aging Americans as their children trend away from home. This book presents suggestions for medical professionals and policymakers about the aging population. In The Anthropology of Aging, a New Area for Studies of Culture and Personality, Clark demonstrates that humans are dynamic creatures and as a result their personalities change throughout their entire lifetime. In her paper The Cultural Context of Medical Practice, Clark identifies the difficulty of meeting the needs of all cultures due to the variation around the beliefs towards medical practices. In Explorations of Acculturation: Toward A Model of Ethnic Identity, Clark explores the relationship between acculturation and ethnic identity, identifies the importance of personal choice, generation of residence and other influencing factors, and derives six types of bicultural life based on a sample of three generations from two ethnic minority groups.

Her list of published works includes:

- Health in the Mexican-American Culture; a community study
- Culture and Aging: An Anthropological Study of Older Adults
- The Anthropology of Aging, a New Area for Studies of Culture and Personality
- Explorations of Acculturation: Toward A Model of Ethnic Identity
- The Cultural Context of Medical Practice
- A “Bootstrap” Scaling Technique
- The Cultural Patterning of Risk-Seeking Behavior

== Legacy ==
Clark revolutionized the field of anthropology by being one of the first to emphasize the importance of social and cultural background in health and medicine. She used this innovative socio-cultural analysis to create what now is the Department of Anthropology, History and Social Medicine at UCSF. Clark also co-founded the Medical Anthropology Training Program as part of a joint program between UCSF and UC Berkeley in 1975 and established the UCSF Multidisciplinary Training Program in Applied Gerontology in 1976.

In 1980, she was the first woman and first social scientist to be named as a Faculty Research Lecturer by UCSF. She also received the Distinguished Membership Award of the Gerontological Society of America in 1989 and the Malinowski Award of the Society for Applied Anthropology in 1992.

The Association of Anthropology, Gerontology and the Life Course created the annual “Margaret Clark Award” in 1994 to honor her commitment to mentoring younger colleagues. The award is given to the best graduate and undergraduate papers relating to anthropology and gerontology.

The UCSF Department of Anthropology, History & Social Medicine created the M. Margaret Clark Memorial Fund in her honor at the time of her death in 2003, with the goal of inspiring and training future generations of medical anthropologists. UCSF began expanding the fund in 2014 to integrate new aspects, such as the annual M. Margaret Clark Memorial Lecture, in order to promote her quest for a cultural understanding of the development and practices of health and medicine.
