= David Murray (painter) =

Scottish landscape painter

David Murray RA
- Born: 29 January 1849; Glasgow, Scotland
- Died: 14 November 1933 (aged 84); Marylebone, England
- Occupation: Painter

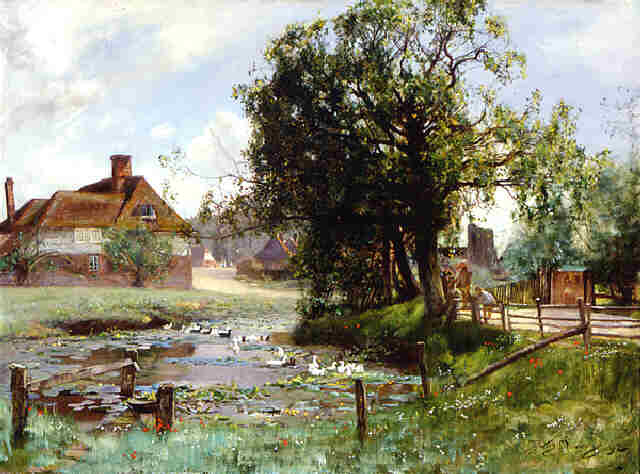
Village duckpond

Sir David Murray RA (29 January 1849 in Glasgow, Scotland – 14 November 1933 in Marylebone, England) was a Scottish landscape painter.

== Biography ==
He was the son of a shoemaker, James Murray. He worked for eleven years for two mercantile firms, while studying in the evenings at the Glasgow School of Art under Robert Greenlees, finally devoting himself full-time to an artistic career from about 1875. He became an Associate of the Royal Scottish Academy in 1881, moving to London in 1882 where he was an immediate success. His 'My Love has gone a-Sailing' exhibited in 1884 was purchased by the Chantrey Trustees for the Tate Gallery.

In 1891 Murray was elected an Associate of the Royal Academy, and a full member of the Royal Academy in 1905. About 1886 he broadened his horizons and travelled to the continent, but all of his more characteristic work was done in Scotland or England. Murray was a member of Glasgow Art Club and exhibited in the club's annual exhibitions. He became president of the Royal Institute of Painters in Water Colours in succession to Sir James Linton in 1917; the year before he was knighted in 1918. Murray did not marry and during the whole of his life in London, he occupied the same bachelor's quarters, a studio on Portland Place.

A portrait of Sir David Murray by the Scottish painter James Coutts Michie is held by the Aberdeen Art Gallery.
