= Coats Observatory =

Public observatory in Scotland

Coats Observatory is Scotland's oldest public observatory. It is currently closed for refurbishment as part of a 4-year long £42m transformation of the observatory and museum buildings. Located in Oakshaw Street West, Paisley, Renfrewshire, the observatory has been operational since 1 October 1883 and continues to function to this day, offering visitors the opportunity to view the night sky through the powerful telescopes housed within the building. The observatory is currently closed for redevelopment and is due to reopen in 2025.

Coats Observatory

== History ==
=== Foundation of Coats Observatory ===
The idea to create an observatory in Paisley came from the annual general meeting of the Paisley Philosophical Institution (PPI) held in 1880. The PPI was founded on 13 October 1808, having its origins among the educated and professional gentlemen of the burgh, such as ministers, doctors, lawyers and bankers. These 'noble pioneers of philosophy' [Gardner, P5] banded together with a view to improving themselves and their fellow towns-people through lectures, the collection of scientific books and by the formation of a museum, an idea first mooted in 1858 which eventually reached fruition in 1871 with the opening of the first phase of Paisley Museum.

At the 1880 AGM of the PPI a proposal was made that a telescope should be purchased, to be housed in a tower which was to be built in the new extension to the museum currently under construction. This decision came about as several lectures with an astronomical theme had been given to the PPI in 1878 and 1879, including four by Robert Grant, Professor of Astronomy at the University of Glasgow and one by Reverend John Crouch entitled 'The Telescope in Relation to Astronomical Observation'.

The council of the institution agreed to purchase a telescope and Thomas Coats, a member of the world-famous thread manufacturing family and also of the PPI council, offered to meet the costs involved. He also proposed the creation of a purpose-built observatory to be located in Oakshaw Street, to the rear of the museum complex. This street is one of the highest points in the local townscape giving an uninterrupted 360^{o} view over the town.

The architect chosen for the project was John Honeyman. He had been responsible for the design of many houses, churches and other buildings throughout the country, including Paisley Museum, Art Galleries and Library, and he had carried out alteration work to the now-demolished University of Glasgow's observatory in 1862 and 1871, so was familiar with the design issues needed to create a fully functional observatory.

=== Architectural Features ===
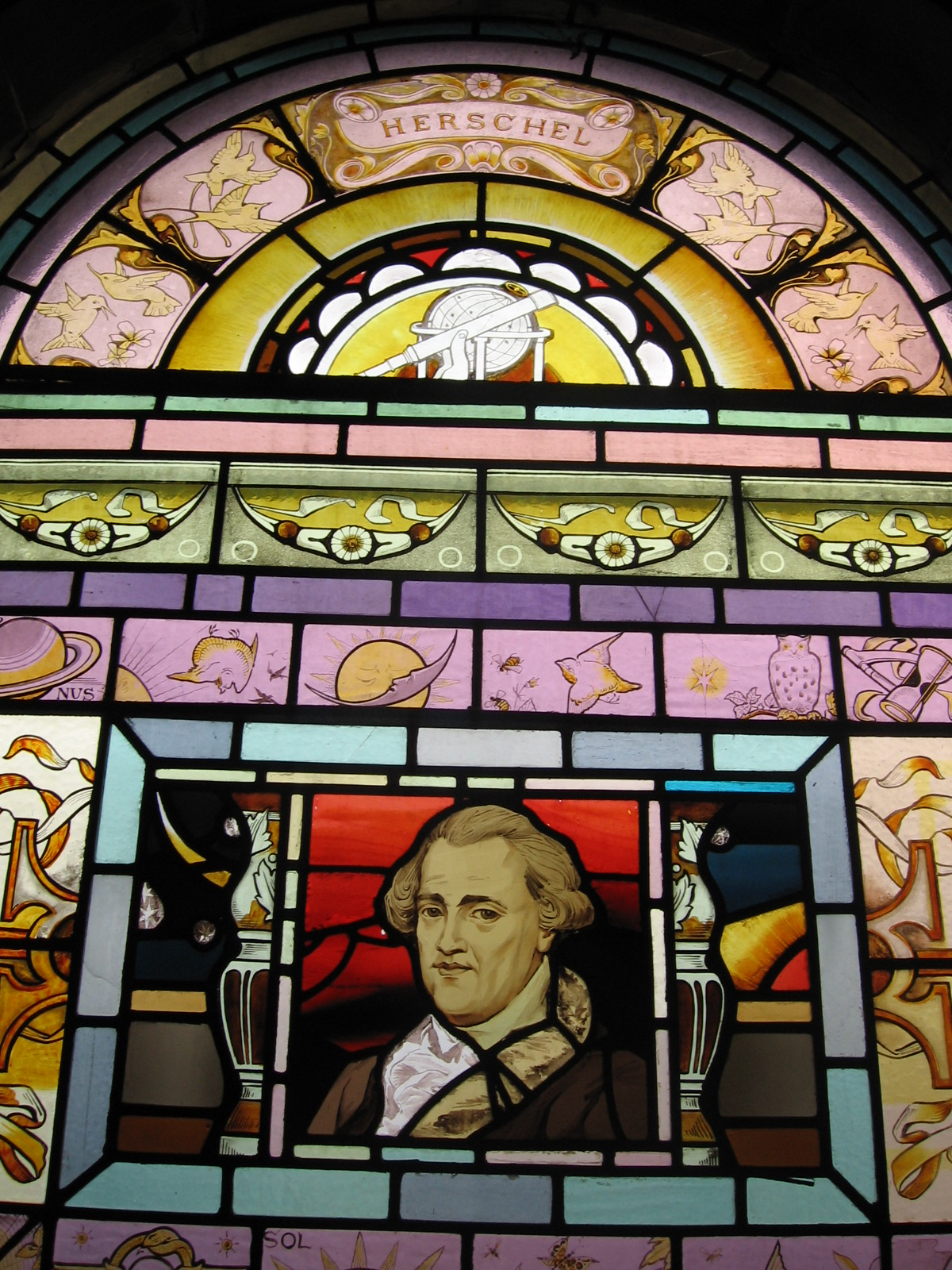
William Herschel window

Honeyman's design incorporates a number of interesting architectural features. The building consists of a three-storey tower, reaching a height of almost 20 metres, and topped by a copper-plated domed roof, within which the telescope is housed. The dome is reached via a short flight of stairs at the beginning and end and a ramped walkway between, designed this way to limit the number of steps required to reach the top of the building and to facilitate the easier passage of equipment throughout. The entrance foyer features a large stained-glass window dedicated to the late 18th century astronomer William Herschel plus further depictions in stained glass of earlier astronomers Johannes Kepler and Galileo.

The building was designed to incorporate the use of borrowed light at every opportunity. Large windows in the exterior of the building at first floor level feed into the room at that height. The exterior of the floor above is edged with round port-hole style windows. These widen on the inside, thus projecting the light from outside into the room, taking as much advantage of natural light as possible.

Stone carving work throughout the building was carried out by Glasgow sculptor James Young and decorative ironwork was made by MacFarlanes at their Saracen Foundry in Glasgow. MacFarlanes were responsible for a great deal of the surviving 19th Century wrought ironworks throughout the city and even further afield – for example their work adorns the Raffles Hotel in Singapore.

The total cost of building Coats Observatory was £3097, 17 shillings and sixpence.

=== Memorial Stone Ceremony ===
Work commenced on the observatory in late 1881. With the construction of the tower well underway it was decided to commemorate the new building with the laying of a memorial stone, a duty performed by Thomas Coats on 8 March 1882 at an event attended by a number of local dignitaries, including the Provost, Magistrates and Town Council and members of the PPI. The stone was accompanied by a 'time capsule' containing newspapers, small portraits of Mr & Mrs Coats and some coins of the realm.

A presentation of a silver trowel was made to Thomas Coats as a memento of the day and he is recorded as saying that he hoped the observatory would "prove a stimulus to interest the rising generation of the town and neighbourhood in the study of astronomy – a science little understood among us, but which may, under the leading spirits of our Philosophical Institution, become a subject of instruction that will be eagerly sought after."

=== Naming of Coats Observatory ===
At a meeting held in Paisley Museum on 18 October 1882 Thomas Coats officially handed over the observatory and telescope to the Paisley Philosophical Institution. As well as outlining the building developments he announced the creation of an endowment fund of £2000 (1882 value) towards the upkeep and development of the observatory. This gesture saw the PPI Council meeting of January 1883 agreeing to name the place 'Coats Observatory' in Thomas Coats' honour.

=== Operation of Coats Observatory ===
A set of rules for the operation of the observatory were drawn up at this time. The building was open from 11 a.m. to 3 p.m. and then from dusk, or 7 p.m. whichever was earlier, until midnight daily, except Sunday. If the weather was unsuitable for observing the observatory would close at 10 p.m. Members of the PPI were allowed free admission on presentation of their membership cards. The general public were allowed in from the beginning of September to the end of April on a Monday, Thursday and Saturday between 7 p.m. and 11 p.m. However, they had to purchase a ticket beforehand at a cost of two pence which could only be used on the day and at the hour specified, with a maximum of twenty tickets issued for each hour. If the weather did not allow for telescope viewings the ticket could be exchanged for another one offering another day and time free of charge. Friday evenings during the winter were set aside for teachers and trainee teachers within the burgh boundaries to use the telescope.

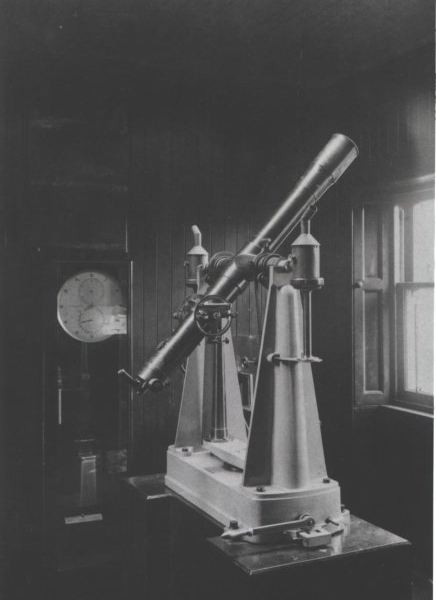
Interior of Transit House with the Transit Telescope

=== Transit House ===
Construction of the main observatory building was complete by May 1883, but the official opening of the building did not take place until 1 October. The delay was partly caused by the construction of a smaller building behind the observatory tower to house an astronomical clock and telescope. The building, known as Transit House, would accurately measure time by observing the movement of the stars across the meridian and setting the clock accordingly. The accuracy of the clock was such that in 1884 Paisley Town Hall clock was connected to it, as were clocks at Ferguslie Thread Works and the Liberal Club in Paisley High Street, thus providing astronomically-correct time to the citizens of Paisley.

=== Opening of Coats Observatory ===
A grand ceremony had been planned for the October opening, but unfortunately Thomas Coats' health had deteriorated considerably. His wish was to forego any formal event and so the building opened without any fanfare at all. He only managed to visit the completed building once as he died on 15 October 1883, aged 74.

Coats Observatory was officially opened for business on 1 October 1883, and the first visitor to the building was Robert Grant, Professor of Astronomy at Glasgow University.

=== First Curator ===
The first curator of Coats Observatory was Donald McLean, who had been assistant to Professor Grant at Glasgow University. He was selected from a list of over 400 applicants, and he received an annual salary of £80 for his astronomical and meteorological observations. Mr. McLean had not long taken up the post when he was involved in an accident in the observatory. The lever mechanism which opened and closed the dome broke off, injuring him in the process. The observatory was closed for six weeks whilst the damage was repaired and the curator recuperated, which he thankfully did and he continued in his role at Coats Observatory until he retired in April 1931, aged 80, after almost 50 years service.

=== Distinguished Visitors ===
Coats Observatory visitors book records the name, address and occupation of all of those who came to the building. As well as the everyday visitor there are many notable guests, such as William Speirs Bruce, the leader of the Scottish National Antarctic Expedition from 1902 to 1904; Howard Grubb, telescope maker; David Gill, Her Majesty's Royal astronomer at the Cape Observatory in South Africa from 1879 to 1907; Frank Watson Dyson, Astronomer Royal of England from 1910 to 1933; and Keir Hardie, one of the founders of the Labour Party.

=== Expansion of the Observatory ===
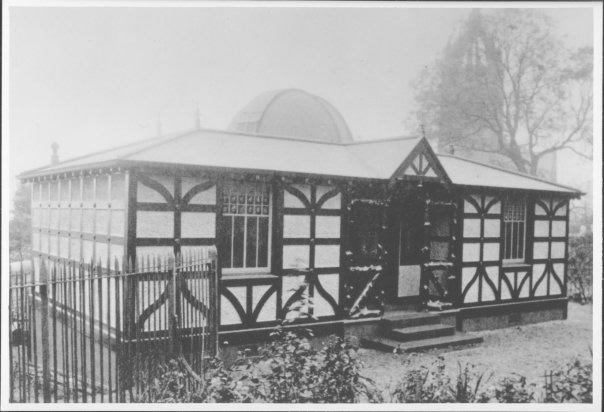
Pavilion, built behind Coats Observatory in 1898 to house additional equipment

After Thomas Coats' death his son James took over the family involvement in the Observatory, increasing the endowment and purchasing a number of pieces of scientific equipment for use in the building. The addition of all of this equipment made it necessary to provide more accommodation. A pavilion was built behind the main observatory building, which was opened by Lord Balfour of Burleigh, Secretary of State for Scotland, on 14 September 1898. After being given a tour of the buildings and the equipment he is noted as 'expressing his gratitude for what he had seen and congratulating the citizens of Paisley on the opportunities which they possessed for the study of Astronomy'.

=== Early 20th Century ===
Throughout the early years of the 20th century the observatory continued to operate as it had done, with visits by schools, other groups and members of the public, astronomical society meetings and daily weather recordings.

Shortly after the outbreak of the First World War the fortunes of Coats Observatory began to decline. Visitor activity was curtailed. Lectures were not given due to the absence of street lighting, brought about by the Lighting Order of 1916 introduced due to the fear of zeppelin bombing raids.

The post-war drop in the value of currency saw the value of the endowment left by the Coats family decrease. Consequently, maintenance of the building and equipment was not carried out, leading to a state of neglect and decline which saw the telescope out of action for almost a year. This was remedied in 1924, when the telescopes were given a major overhaul and repairs carried out to the building, although a setback occurred in April 1925 when the adjoining building, housing the Paisley Photographic Society meeting rooms, went on fire, causing damage to the weather recording instruments housed there

After the Second World War the value of the endowment decreased further and the running costs for the Observatory had to be partly met by the income from the winter lecture series of the PPI.

The final financial crisis came about in 1957, with the retiral of Mr. John Woodrow, who had been acting as curator since 1931. His salary had remained at its pre-war figure and it became impossible to increase it to attract a successor. Adequate funds for maintenance and repairs to the building were also hard to find.

The original deed of gift drawn up by Thomas Coats contained a proviso that if ever the Philosophical Institution should find itself unable to continue to pay for the upkeep of the Observatory it should be offered to Paisley Town Council, as the local authority was then.

=== 1963 to Present Day ===
In 1963 management was transferred to the Town Council and the observatory placed under the charge of the Museum and Art Galleries Committee. Repairs and decoration of the building were undertaken and the telescope given an overhaul. An Observatory Technician was appointed and the building was opened once a week for visits by the general public.

1983 saw the centenary of the observatory, and a commemorative medallion was struck to mark the occasion. The observatory was also opened daily during the winter months to allow visitors the opportunity of looking at the night sky through the telescope.

In 1996 the original dome was replaced with a new one, built to original specifications and using original materials. The observatory was closed and the new dome hoisted into position by a large crane.

Coats Observatory is currently closed as part of the 'Paisley Museum Re-imagined' project, which will transform the museum into a re-imagined home for the area's outstanding art, science and natural history collections, and is scheduled to reopen in late 2025.

== Telescopes ==
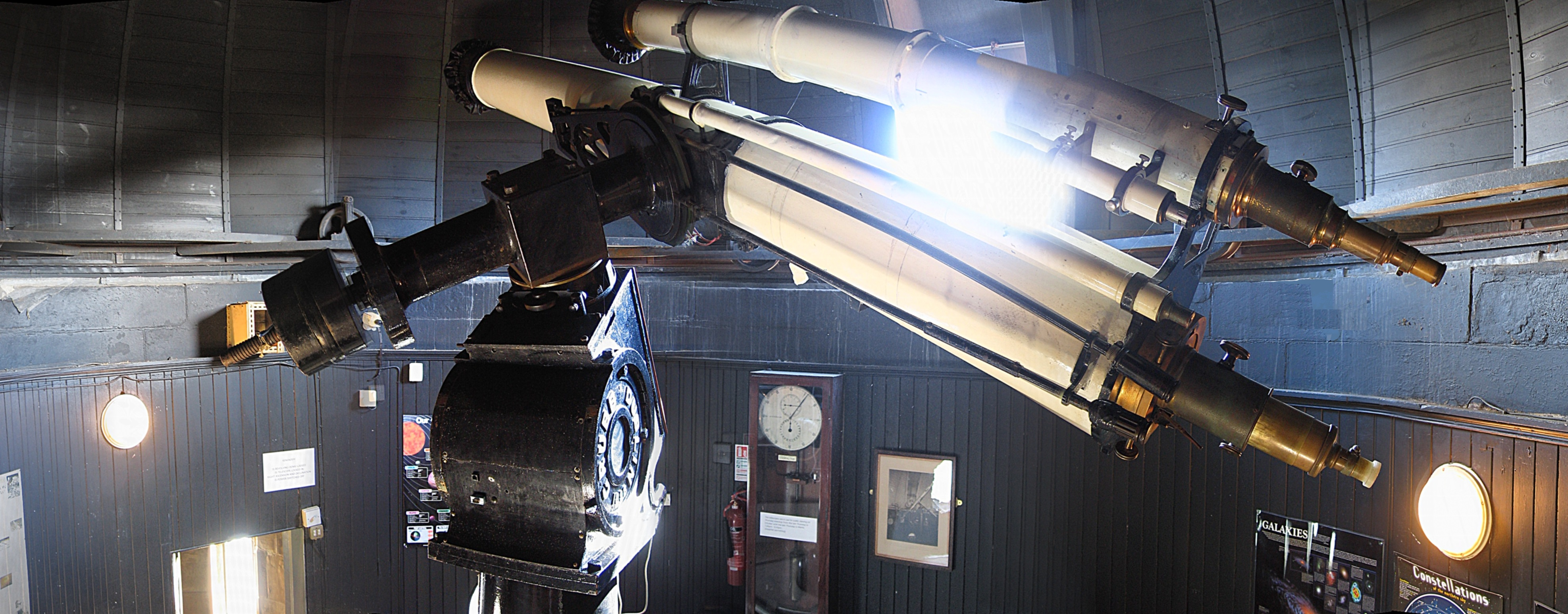
Coats Observatory Telescopes

The original telescope installed in 1883 was a 5-inch refractor made by Thomas Cooke of York. In 1898 a second, larger telescope was installed to operate alongside the original Cooke one. This was a 10-inch Equatorial built by Howard Grubb of Dublin. Both telescopes are still operational and used during the winter viewing nights.

== Planetarium ==
A planetarium projector was installed in 1994, providing a view of the night sky as it would appear above Paisley on a clear night. The constellations and the position of the planets could be projected on to the roof, giving the illusion of being outdoors observing the movement of the stars. This projector was replaced in 2012 with a digital one which projects the night sky in even greater detail.

== Scientific Apparatus ==
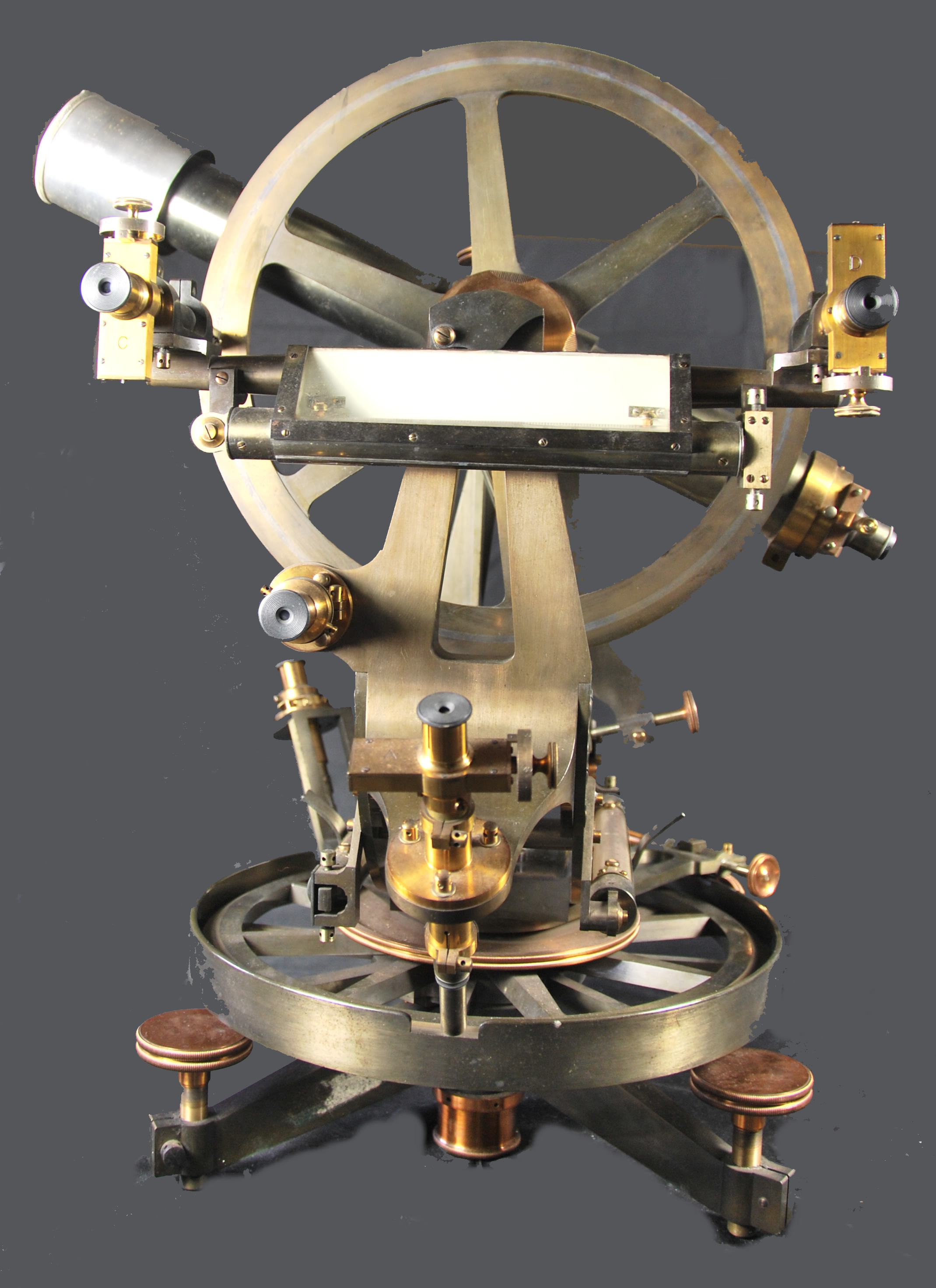
Alt-Az Telescope by Troughton & Simms

Coats Observatory was furnished with a wide range of scientific apparatus for observing the night sky and making meteorological records. In 1900 seismic monitoring equipment was installed for recording earthquakes. Coats Observatory was one of the stations across the world which recorded the 1906 San Francisco earthquake.

Apart from the two original telescopes the rest of the equipment now makes up the science collections held by Paisley Museum. The collection includes equipment from the leading manufacturers of the day such as telescopes by Troughton & Simms, microscopes by R&J Beck, spectroscopes by Adam Hilger and Howard Grubb and seismometers by R.W. Munro.

== Weather Recording ==
Thomas Coats had meticulously recorded the weather at his home of Ferguslie House in Paisley since 1858 and gifted the observatory a barometer and thermometer prior to its opening. Additional equipment was added to keep weather records, which were regularly sent to the Met Office in Edinburgh. Weather recording is one function which has carried on at Coats Observatory uninterrupted since 1884 and all the weather logs are stored at the observatory and can be viewed on request. In 2011 an automated weather station was introduced, which takes observations every thirty minutes as opposed to once a day as was previously done.

== Images taken through Coats Observatory Telescopes ==
Full Moon taken through the 5-inch Cooke refractor at Coats Observatory.

Detail of Moon through the 10-inch Grubb telescope at Coats Observatory.

Solar Eclipse March 2006 taken at Coats Observatory.

== Other public observatories ==
- City Observatory, Edinburgh
- Airdrie Public Observatory
- Mills Observatory, Dundee
- Scottish Dark Sky Observatory, Dalmellington

== See also ==
- List of astronomical observatories
- List of astronomical societies
- List of Category A listed buildings in Renfrewshire
- List of listed buildings in Paisley, Renfrewshire
