= Paisley Philosophical Institution =

Scottish cultural and educational organisation

The Paisley Philosophical Institution (sometimes referred to as the Paisley Philosophical Society) is a cultural and educational organisation based in Paisley, Renfrewshire, Scotland. It was founded on 8 October 1808 with the aim of educating members in scientific matters, creating a museum and establishing a library.

The Institution has helped to found several local bodies, including the Paisley Free Library and Museum (1871), the Coats Observatory (1882) and Paisley Technical College and School of Art (1897; subsequently the University of Paisley, now part of the University of the West of Scotland).

== See also ==
- Thomas Coats
- John Mills McCallum
- Morris Young
