= Alisse Waterston =

American professor of anthropology

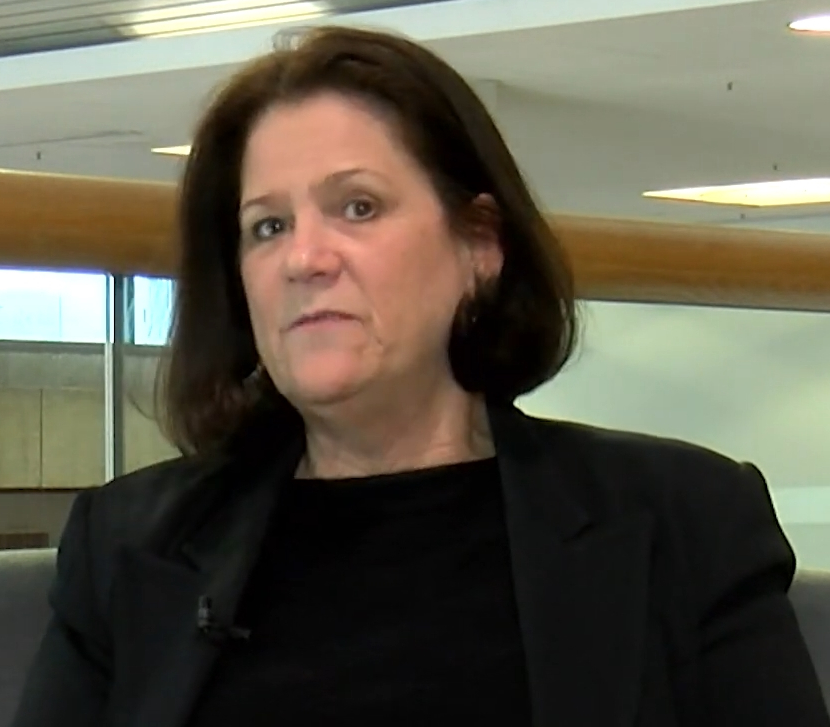
American anthropologist Alisse Waterston

Alisse Waterston (born 1951) is an American professor of anthropology at John Jay College of Criminal Justice, City University of New York. Her work focuses on how systemic violence and inequality influence society.

== Early life and education ==
Waterston attended New York University, receiving her bachelor's degree in experimental psychology and education. She then continued her education, earning her master's degree at Columbia University, where she focused on Cultural Anthropology, with Puerto Rican Women in the U.S.: Family, Religion and Political Economy as her thesis. This was followed by her PhD studies at City University of New York Graduate Center in 1990. Her dissertation, Aspects of Street Addict Life, was published that year.

== Career ==
Waterston served as an adjunct instructor from 1981 to 1985 at Pace University at White Plains and Pleasantville, N.Y., in the Department of Anthropology and Sociology. In 1991 and 1992 she was Adjunct Assistant Professor at State University of New York, in the Purchase Division of Social Sciences. She was then hired for a year as adjunct assistant professor at the Department of Anthropology and Sociology of Fordham University.

Along with her sister Adriana, in 1992 Waterston co-founded Surveys Unlimited, a Horowitz Associates division dedicated to the social, cultural and ethnic research for urban markets. She served as president from the founding until 2003. During this time she was a visiting associate professor at New School for Social Research from 1996 to 1998 in the Graduate Faculty in Sociology in New York. In 1998, Waterston was awarded the NAMIC Excellence Award for Research. She worked as editor of North American Dialogue (the publication of the Society for the Anthropology of North America) for six years.

In 2003 Waterston became an associate professor at John Jay College of Criminal Justice in the Associate Department of Anthropology.

In 2005, Alisse served as the executive program chair for the 104th annual meeting of the American Anthropological Association.

In 2006, Waterston was named chair of a new American Anthropological Association board on the Future of Electronic and Print Publishing, a committee to oversee the AAA transition to digital publishing with AnthroSource. In 2015 she serves as the organization's chair.

In 2009 Waterston became a full professor at John Jay College of Criminal Justice.

In 2013 she published an ethnographic account of her father in a book titled My Father's Wars (Routledge). She is president-elect of the American Anthropological Association, to serve as its vice president (2014–2015) and president in 2016–2017. She is a member of John Jay College Foundation, Inc. board of trustees and a Non-resident Long-term Fellow at Swedish Collegium for Advanced Study in Uppsala, Sweden.

== Publications ==
- Street Addicts in the Political Economy was published in 1993 by the Temple University Press. Waterston discusses economic and socio political forces that lead to a street-addict life in urban areas.
  - Love, Sorrow and Rage: Destitute Women in a Manhattan Residence was published on 1999 by the Temple University press. An insider's view on how it is like to live in the streets of NY and what kind of problems the homeless women face.
- An Anthropology of War: Views from the Frontline (2008).
- Anthropology off the Shelf: Anthropologists on Writing was published in 2011 with cultural anthropologist Maria D. Vesperi. 18 anthropologists write about publishing research materials.
- My Father’s Wars: Migration, Memory, and the Violence of a Century (2013) is written from a view point of a daughter analyzing her father who has been influenced greatly by 20th century social history.
