= Middle East Supply Centre =

The Middle East Supply Center (MESC) was “an Anglo-American agency that had complete control over the flow of civilian supplies to the Middle East during the Second World War. It was created by the British in April 1941 starting in Egypt, Palestine and Syria and reporting to the Ministry of War Transport.

During the war shipping was in short supply and involved a high amount of risk due to German submarine warfare. It was also necessary to ensure that military supplies could have precedence through congested Middle Eastern ports. The MESC was a clearing house for consumer items in order to eliminate non essential shipping and trade while at the same time ensuring that the population did not become hostile due to economic deprivation.

Due to the amount of Lend Lease aid that was coming into the region, the Americans joined the British in the MESC to help co-ordinate aid in the Middle East.

The MESC co-ordinated imports and local substitutes for civilian rationing and to promote agricultural improvements. By March 1943 the MESC had replaced about 100 Liberty Ship deliveries worth of imports with increased local production of potatoes, cooking oil, dairy products and fish; cattle drives from Sudan obviated the need for refrigerated shipping.

The Medical Division was concerned with medical and health supplies required by the twenty countries in that region.”

The MESC operated until 1945.
