= Peter Coats =

Scottish thread manufacturer and philanthropist

Portrait by Daniel Mcnee

Sir Peter Coats of Auchendrane FRSE JP DL (18 July 1808 – 9 March 1890) was a Scottish thread manufacturer and philanthropist. He was co-founder of the firm J & P Coats, which later evolved into Coats Group.

== Life ==
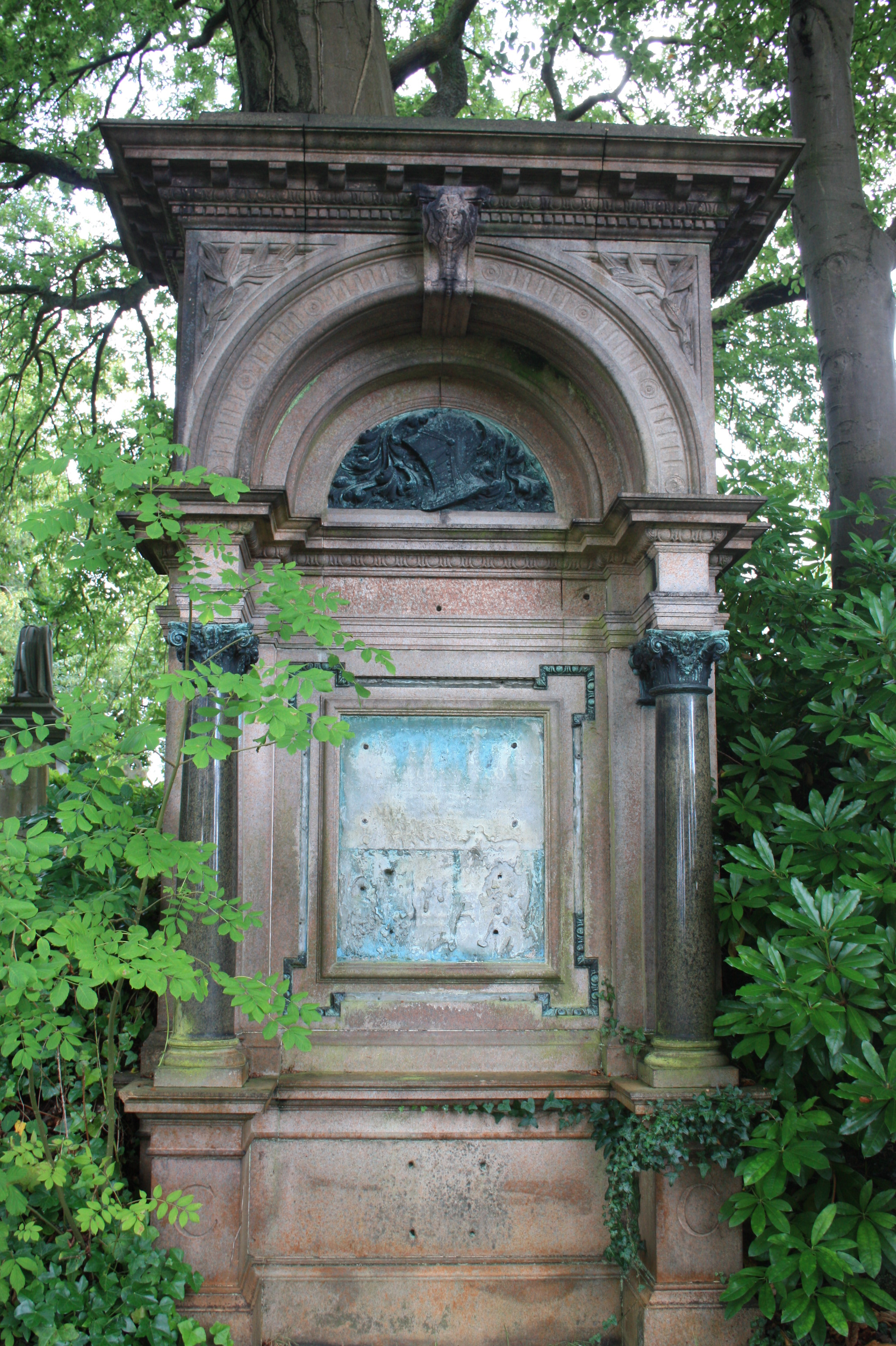
The grave of Sir Peter Coats, Woodside Cemetery, Paisley

Coats was born in Paisley, the third son of James Coats and Catherine Mitchell, and is deeply associated with that town. He attended Paisley Grammar School and then the University of Glasgow, at first intending to study for as a minister. However he decided to follow his father as a thread manufacturer (largely in partnership with his younger brother Thomas Coats).

In 1850, he had a large mansion, Woodside House, built for him in Paisley. This was designed by Charles Wilson.

He was knighted in 1869. Following his wife's death in 1877 he retired to Auchedrane near Maybole in Ayrshire. He is fondly remembered in Maybole.

He was elected a Fellow of the Royal Society of Edinburgh in 1881. His proposers were Sir Daniel Macnee, Sir Archibald Geikie, Alexander Buchan and Robert Mackay Smith.

He died in the Mustapha Superieur quarter of Algiers on 9 March 1890 aged 81. His body was returned to Paisley for burial in Woodside Cemetery, west of the town centre. The bronze central tablet has been stolen from the grave but the inscription is visible in silhouette. The grave is paired with that of Sir Thomas Coats, flanking the statue to James Fillans.

== Philanthropy ==
In the same vein as Carnegie, Coats believed that gain in personal wealth had to be balanced against good deeds in a public way. In 1870 Coats gifted his home town of Paisley a Free Library and Museum, the Paisley Museum and Art Galleries, built wholly at his expense, and intended for the improvement and education of all.

== Artistic recognition ==
A statue of Peter Coats is paired with a statue of Thomas Coats in the centre of Paisley just west of the town hall. The pair were sculpted by William Birnie Rhind.

== Family ==
Sir Peter and his wife Gloranna McKenzie had twelve children, five sons and seven daughters. Their eldest son, Sir James Coats (1834–1913), was made a baronet in 1905.
