= James Waterston (entomologist) =

Scottish entomologist

James Waterston (7 February 1879 – 28 April 1930) was a Scottish entomologist and minister of the United Free Church of Scotland who in 1917 was appointed as the first specialist hymenopterist at the Imperial Bureau of Entomology.

James Waterston was born on 7 February 1879 in Paisley, Renfrewshire, Scotland, and was educated as George Watson's College in Edinburgh before studying Divinity and Science at the University of Edinburgh, graduating with bachelor's degrees in both subjects, before being awarded a doctoral degree in science. He became a minister of the United Free Church in Shetland where he continued his biological studies, carrying out studies of ectoparasites, becoming an authority in the Mallophaga of Britain.

In 1917 Waterston joined the Imperial Bureau of Entomology to study the Hymenoptera of the superfamily Chalcidoidea. He was temporarily commissioned in the Royal Army Medical Corps in May 1917 and served as entomologist to the Malaria Commission at Thessaloniki, Greece, with the rank of captain. In May 1920 he joined the staff of the British Museum, Natural History as Assistant Keeper, First Class, in the Department of Entomology. His main areas of work as a taxonomist were the Chalcidoidea, Mallophaga, or bird lice, and Siphonaptera, or fleas. He died, soon after a major operation, on 28 April 1930 in London. His son, Andrew Rodger Waterston (1912–1996) was also a noted entomologist and malacologist and was, like his father, a curator at Department of Entomology at the British Museum, Natural History.
