= James Peacock (anthropologist) =

American anthropologist

James Lowe Peacock III (born 1937) is an American anthropologist.

Peacock studied psychology at Duke University, graduating with a bachelor's degree in 1959. After completing a doctorate in anthropology at Harvard University in 1965, he began teaching at Princeton University. He joined the University of North Carolina at Chapel Hill faculty in 1967. Peacock received a Guggenheim fellowship in 1980, and was named Kenan Professor of Anthropology in 1987. He was president of the American Anthropological Association between 1993 and 1995. Peacock retired from the University of North Carolina in May 2015. In 2025, he was elected to the American Philosophical Society.

== Bibliography ==
- Grounded Globalism: How the U.S. South Embraces the World. University of Georgia Press. (2007). ISBN 9780820334721.
- The Anthropological Lens: Harsh Light, Soft Focus. Cambridge University Press. (2001). ISBN 9780521004596.
- Pilgrims of Paradox: Calvinism and Experience Among the Primitive Baptists of the Blue Ridge. (1989). University of North Carolina Press. ISBN 9781469635187.
- Muslim Puritans: Reformist Psychology in Southeast Asian Islam. University of California Press. (1978). ISBN 9780520314528.
- Purifying the Faith: The Muhammadijah Movement in Indonesian Islam. University of North Carolina Press. ISBN 9781469635156.
- Consciousness and Change: Symbolic Anthropology in Evolutionary Perspective. (1975). University of North Carolina Press. ISBN 9781469665993.
- Rites of Modernization: Symbolic and Social Aspects of Indonesian Proletarian Drama. University of Chicago Press. (1968). ISBN 9780226651316.
