= 1928 in architecture =

The year 1928 in architecture involved some significant architectural events and new buildings.

== Events ==
- February – Hannes Meyer succeeds Walter Gropius as head of the Bauhaus school.
- June – Congrès Internationaux d'Architecture Moderne is initiated by Le Corbusier.
- Le Corbusier wins all three competitions for design of the Tsentrosoyuz building in Moscow.
- Léon Azéma is appointed Architect of the City of Paris.

== Buildings and structures ==
=== Buildings opened ===
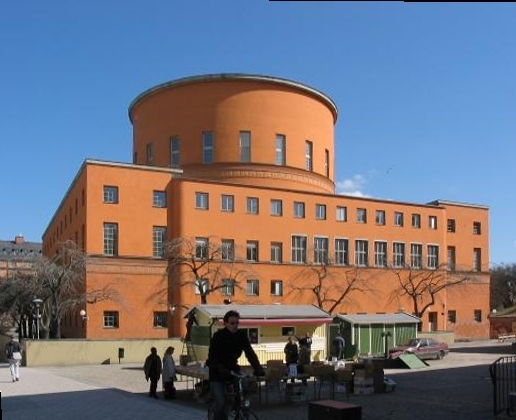
Stockholm Public Library, Sweden

- January 1 – Milam Building in San Antonio, Texas, designed by George Rodney Willis, the tallest brick and reinforced concrete structure and first office building with built-in air conditioning in the United States at this date.
- March 31 – Stockholm Public Library in Sweden, designed by Gunnar Asplund.
- October 6 – Collège Saint Marc, Alexandria, Egypt, designed by Léon Azéma.
- October 25 – Großmarkthalle at Frankfurt am Main, designed by Martin Elsaesser.

=== Buildings completed ===
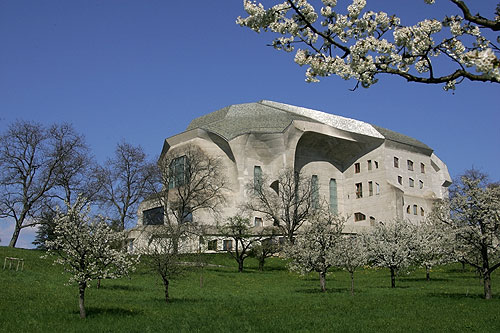
Second Goetheanum in Dornach, Switzerland

- The Royal Horticultural Society New Building, a second exhibition hall for The Royal Horticultural Society, designed by Easton & Robertson, is completed in Westminster, London, the first in the United Kingdom to have a parabolic curved concrete roof structure.
- Second Goetheanum, Dornach, Switzerland, designed by Rudolf Steiner.
- Rusakov Workers' Club in Moscow, USSR, designed by Konstantin Melnikov.
- Firestone Tyre Factory on the 'Golden Mile' of London's Great West Road, designed by Wallis, Gilbert and Partners in Art Deco style (demolished 1980).
- Granada Theatre and Temple Israel (Minneapolis), designed by Liebenberg and Kaplan.
- First Dymaxion House is designed by Buckminster Fuller.
- Balluta Buildings, St. Julian's, Malta, designed by Giuseppe Psaila.
- Industrial Trust Company Building (a.k.a. "Superman Building") in Providence, Rhode Island, designed by Walker & Gillette.
- Petersdorff Department Store in Wrocław, designed by Erich Mendelsohn.
- Samuel-Novarro House in Los Feliz, Los Angeles, California, designed by Lloyd Wright

== Awards ==
- Olympic gold medal – Jan Wils of the Netherlands for Olympic Stadium in Amsterdam.
- Olympic silver medal – Einar Mindedal Rasmussen of Denmark for Swimming pool at Ollerup.
- Olympic bronze medal – Jacques Lambert of France for Stadium at Versailles.
- RIBA Royal Gold Medal – Guy Dawber.
- Grand Prix de Rome, architecture: Eugène Beaudouin.
- Concrete house competition winner for the Daily Mail Ideal Home Exhibition, won by Frederick MacManus of Sir John Burnet and Partners

== Births ==
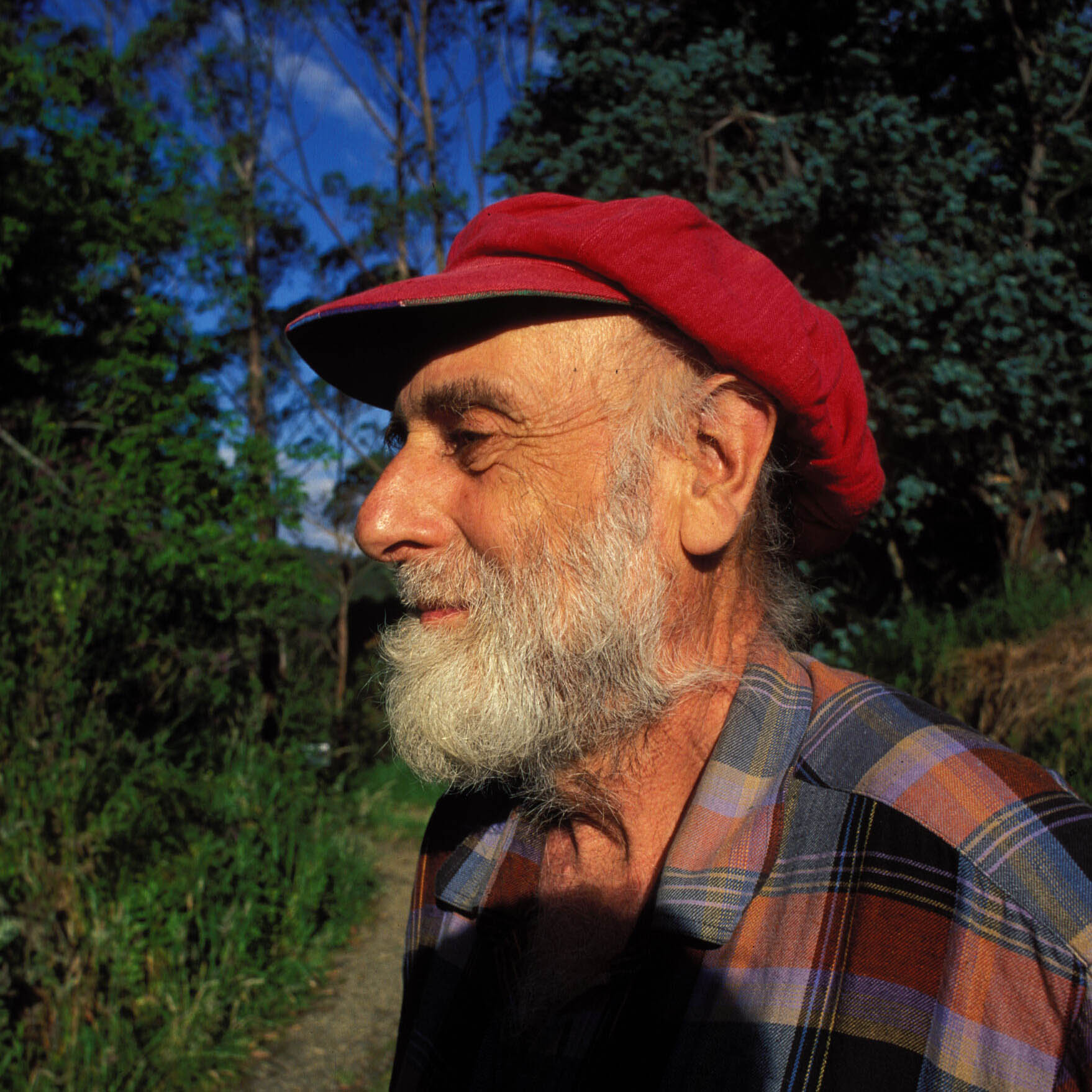
Friedensreich Hundertwasser

- June 24 – Ivan Štraus, Bosnian architect (died 2018)
- June 28 – Alison Smithson, née Gill, English architect (died 1993)
- August 7 – Owen Luder, British architect (died 2021)
- September 8 – Fumihiko Maki, Japanese architect (died 2024)
- October 25 – Paulo Mendes da Rocha, Brazilian architect Pritzker Prize laureate 2006 (died 2021)
- December 15 – Friedensreich Hundertwasser, Austrian architect and artist (died 2000)
- date unknown – James Birrell, Australian architect (died 2019)

== Deaths ==
- January 23 – A. E. Doyle, American architect (born 1877)
- June 23 – Konstantīns Pēkšēns, Latvian-born architect (born 1859)
- December 10 – Charles Rennie Mackintosh, Scottish-born architect and designer (born 1868)
