= Wallis, Gilbert and Partners =

British architectural partnership

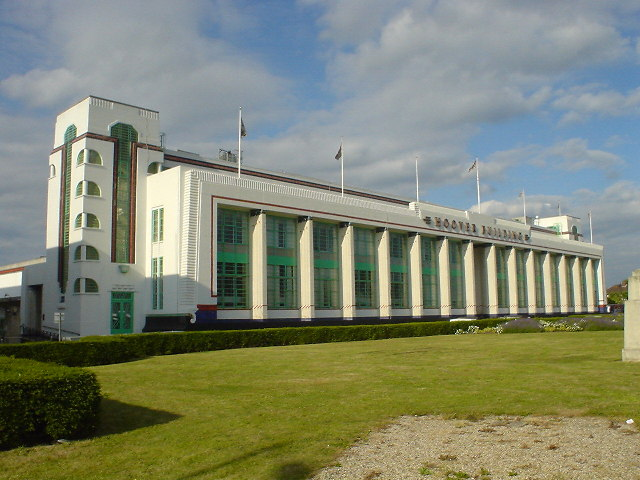
Hoover Factory, Western Avenue, Perivale

Wallis, Gilbert and Partners was a British architectural partnership responsible for the design of many Art Deco buildings in the UK in the 1920s and 1930s.

The partnership was established by Thomas Wallis in 1916. Wallis had previously served with Sir Frank Baines in the Office of Works.

The identity of Gilbert has not been established, and it is unlikely that a Gilbert ever worked at the partnership. Architects who did work in partnership with the firm included James Warne and Harry Beken; later partners included Frederick Button, Douglas Wallis (1901–1968), Agbolahan Adesegun (1935–2008) and J. W. MacGregor (d. 1994).

Notable buildings include the Hoover Factory, the Firestone Tyre Factory, and Abbey Road Studios. Wallis, Gilbert and Partners were responsible for designing nearly a quarter of the industrial buildings studied in one review of factories built in London during the interwar period. The demolition of the Firestone Factory has been credited with the foundation of the Thirties Society, which later became The Twentieth Century Society.

The firm also occasionally designed country houses, for instance, Limber and Ripley Grange at Loughton for Charles Frederick Clark, proprietor of the Caribonum group. The partnership was dissolved in 1945.

== Works ==
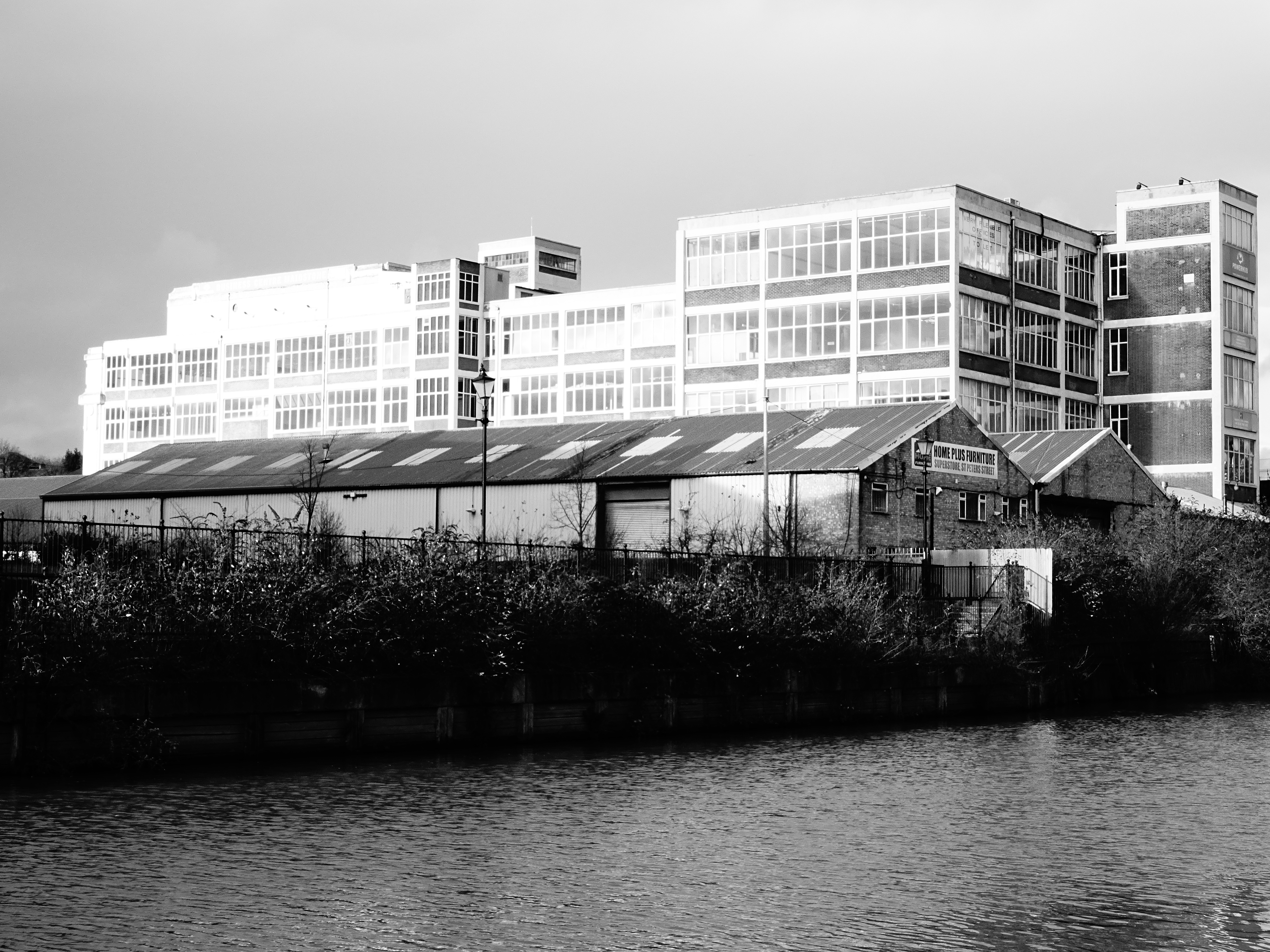
Tilling-Stevens Building, Maidstone

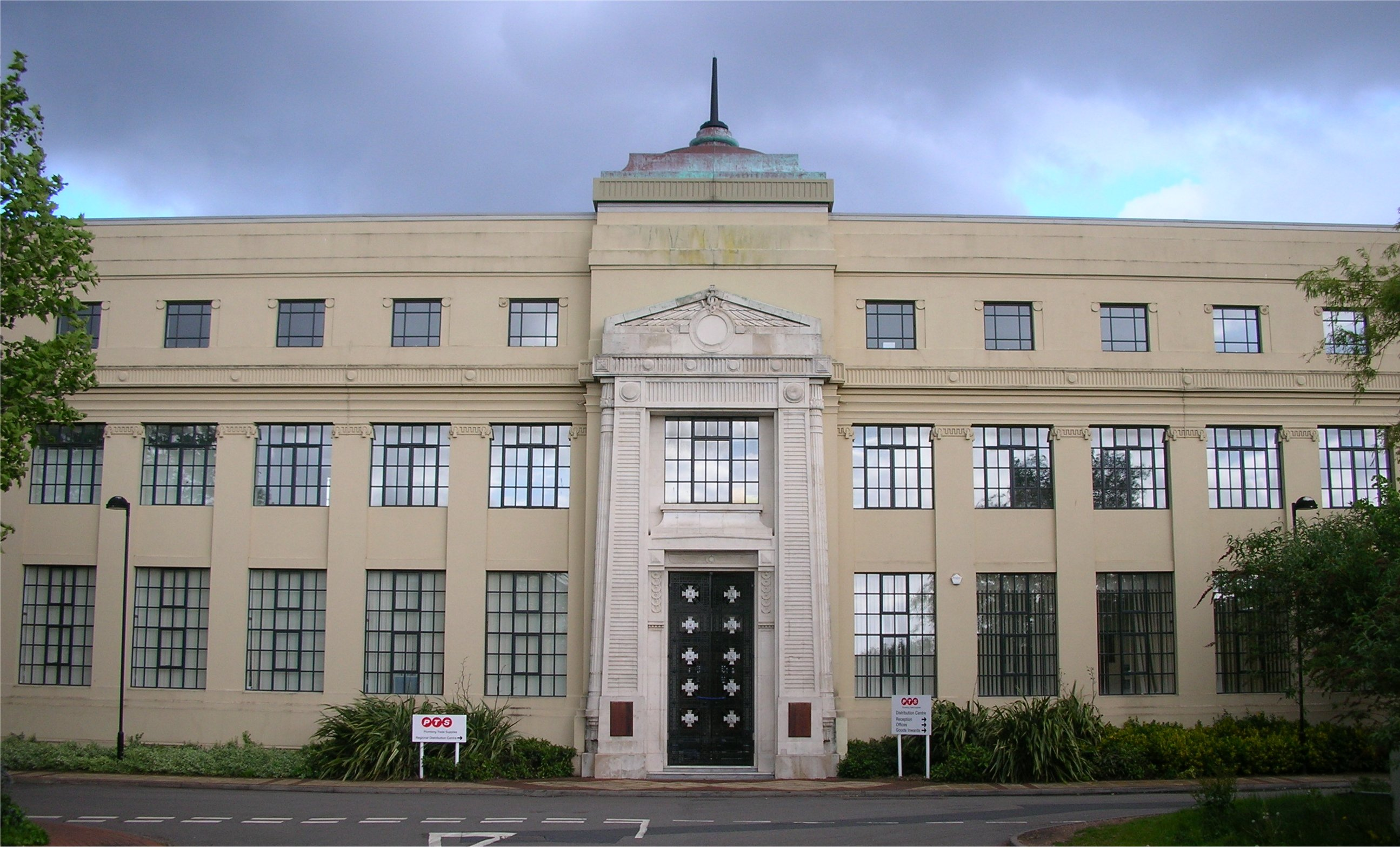
Former office buildings of The General Electric Company, Birmingham

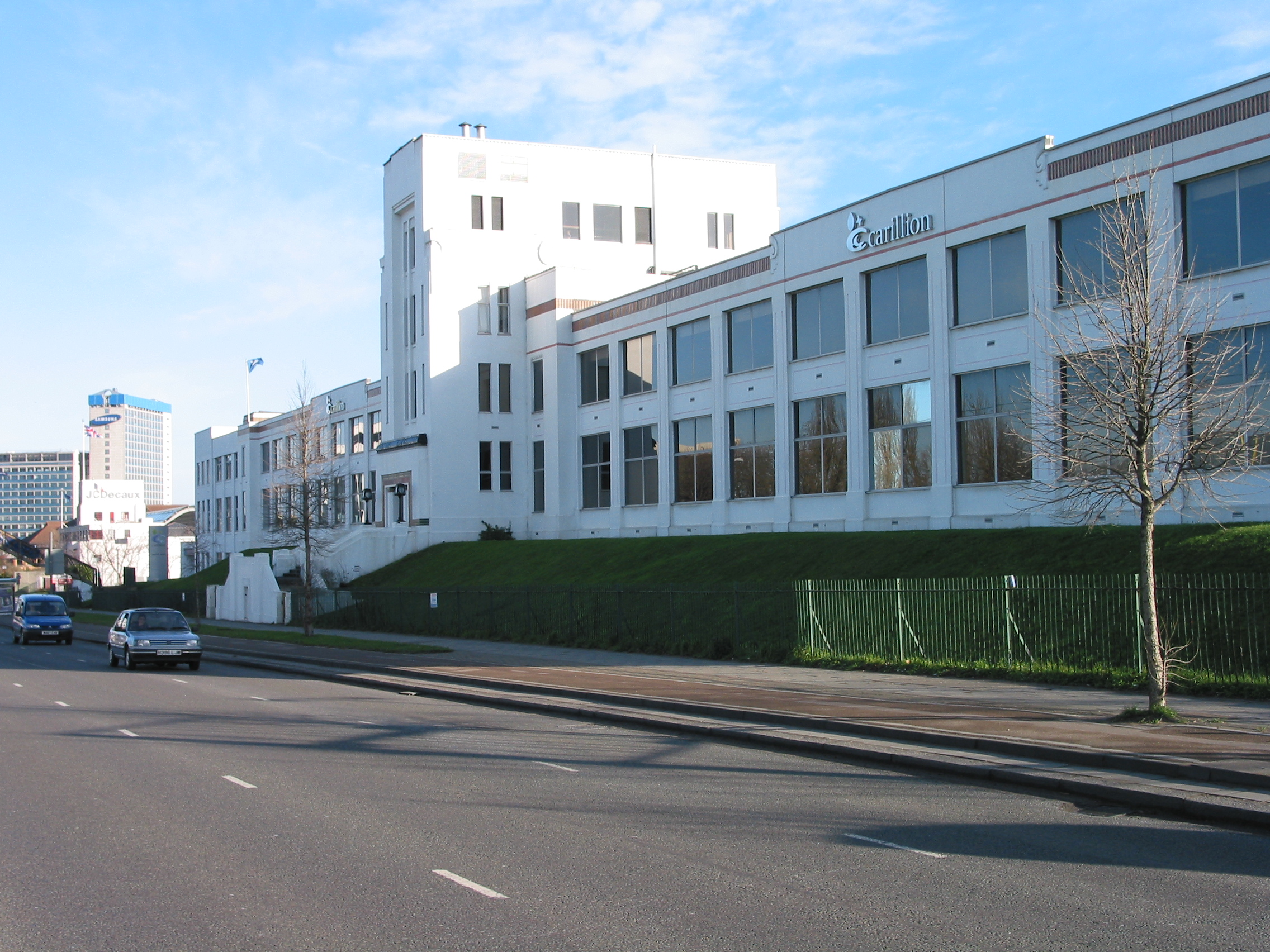
Pyrene Building, Great West Road, Brentford, Middlesex.

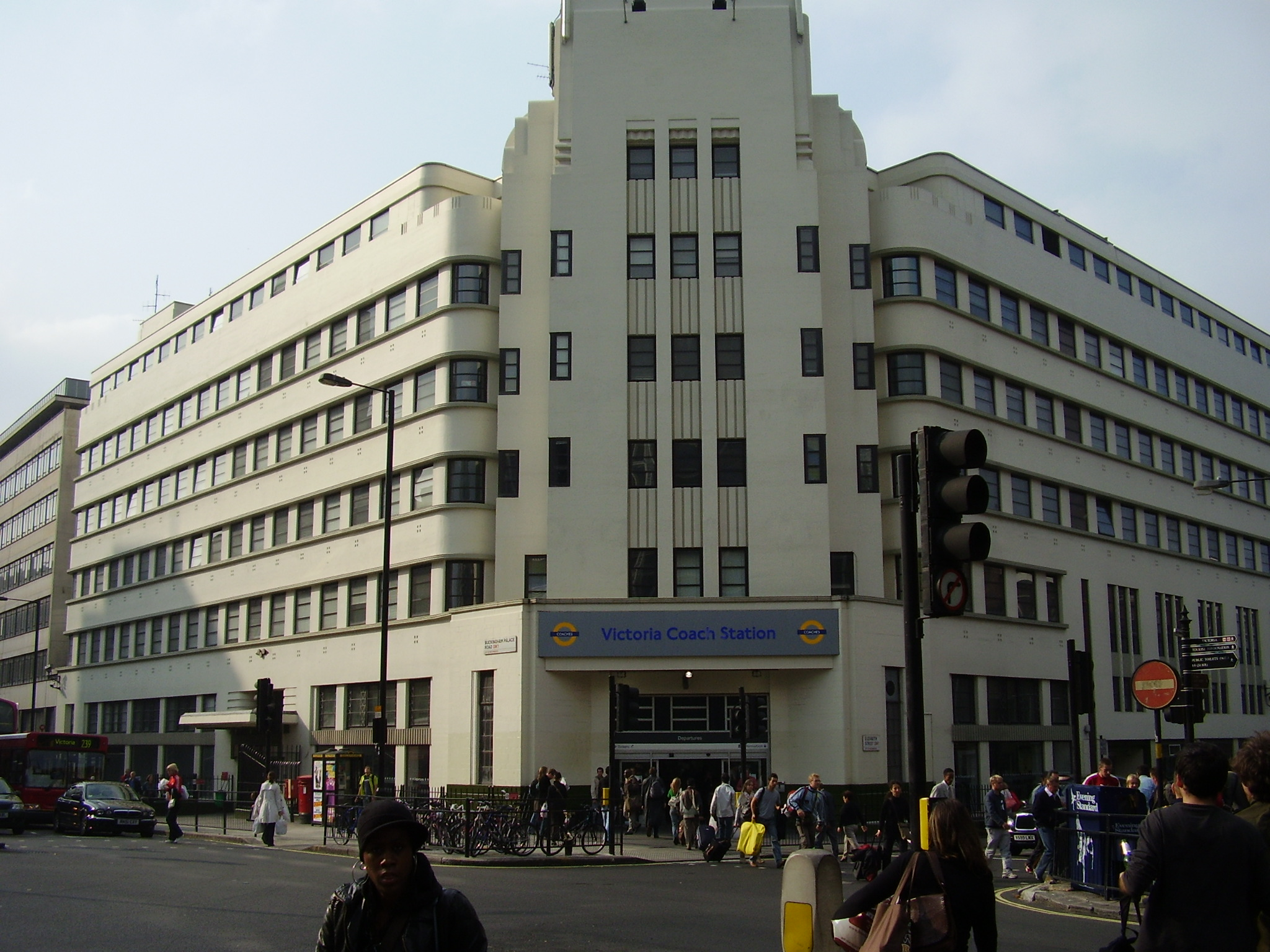
Victoria Coach Station, London

- Tilling-Stevens Factory, Maidstone, Kent, 1917, Grade II listed.
- Caribonum Factory, Leyton, London, 1918.
- General Electrical Company Witton Works, Electric Avenue, Birmingham 1920, Grade II listed.
- The Solex Factory, Marylebone Road, London, 1925.
- Wrigley's Factory, Wembley, London, 1926.
- The Shannon Factory, Kingston, London, 1928.
- EMI factory, Hayes, 1927–29
- Firestone Tyre Factory, Great West Road, Brentford, Middlesex, 1928-1929 (Demolished 1980).
- Pyrene Building, Great West Road, Brentford, 1929-1930
- Abbey Road Studios, 1929-31
- Tower and extension to the 'Alaska' factory, Bermondsey, London 1930s.
- Albion Motor Car Company Ltd Works, Scotstoun, Glasgow 1930.
- India Tyre Factory, Inchinnan 1930-1931.
- Daimler Hire Garage, 9 Herbrand Street, London 1931.
- British Bemberg Factory, Doncaster, Yorkshire, 1931.
- Hoover Factory, Western Avenue, Perivale 1931-1938.
- Victoria Coach Station, London, 1931-1932.
- Coty Cosmetics Factory, Great West Road, Brentford, 1932.
- ASEA Factory (latterly the Hawker Siddeley Power Transformer Factory before its closure in 2003), Walthamstow, 1936.
- Simmonds Aerocessories, later Beecham's Pharmaceuticals Factory, now known as Wallis House, Great West Road, Brentford, 1936-1942.
- Richard Klinger Factory, Sidcup, London, 1937.

The firm also designed a number of bus garages for London Transport and its predecessors at:-

- Addlestone, Surrey
- Amersham, Buckinghamshire
- Epping, Essex
- Grays, Essex
- Hemel Hempstead, Hertfordshire
- Hertford, Hertfordshire
- Peckham, London (demolished 1995)
- Reigate, Surrey
- St Albans, Hertfordshire (in collaboration with Adams, Holden & Pearson)
- Tring, Hertfordshire
- Northfleet, Kent
- Windsor, Berkshire

== Bibliography and references ==
- Curl, James Stevens (2006). A Dictionary of Architecture and Landscape Architecture (Paperback) (Second ed.). Oxford University Press. p. 880. ISBN 0-19-860678-8.
- Skinner, Joan S. (1997). Form and fancy: factories and factory buildings by Wallis, Gilbert and Partner (Paperback) (First ed.). Liverpool University Press. ISBN 978-0-85323-622-1.
