= Firestone Building (disambiguation) =

Firestone Building may refer to one of several architecturally significant buildings that once housed Firestone Tire businesses:

- Firestone Building, Orlando, Florida
- Firestone Building (Gainesville)
- Firestone Tyre Factory, London (demolished)
- Firestone Tire and Service Center, Los Angeles
