= Wallis House, London =

Former factory in London

Wallis House

General information
- Type: Factory, now residential
- Architectural style: Art Deco
- Location: London, England
- Coordinates: 51°29′28″N 0°17′59″W
- Completed: 1936 with substantial additions in 1942

Design and construction
- Architects: George Warren, significant additions by Wallis, Gilbert and Partners

Listed Building – Grade II
- Official name: Smithkline Beecham House Including Midland Bank
- Designated: 25 January 1991
- Reference no.: 1361320

Wallis House is a Grade II listed former factory building, a substantial landmark of the "Golden Mile" in the Brentford area of London.

== History and description ==
The first section of the building, now the east wing, was designed by George Warren for Simmonds Aerocessories and built in 1936. Substantial extensions including the central tower and a mostly symmetrical west wing were completed between 1938 and 1942 to the designs of Wallis, Gilbert and Partners. The finished product is a prominent Art Deco frontage along the Great West Road, a section known as the "Golden Mile" for the collection of factories and along the stretch, many of which were built in these "modern" styles. Its central tower of 11 storeys was of an unusually grand scale for a building of its kind at the time.

In 1947 the British Overseas Airways Corporation converted the building into offices and in 1955 it became the headquarters of the Beecham Group. Under their ownership, further alterations were carried out by R. Gallanaugh, providing space for offices, laboratories, manufacturing, as well as recreational facilities.

In 2004, Assael Architecture submitted plans for the refurbishment of the building as part of their "Great West Quarter" development, retaining its historic exterior but re-purposing the space for residential use. Barratt Redrow carried out the work which had been completed by 2012.

== See also ==
- Firestone Tyre Factory
