= Thomas Wallis (architect) =

British architect (1872–1953)

- Born: 27 May 1872; West Norwood
- Died: 4 May 1953 (aged 80); Worthing
- Occupation: Architect
- Spouse: Edith Elizabeth Wallis (m. 1899; div. 1933) Doris Rudland (m. 1947)
- Children: 3
- Practice: Wallis, Gilbert and Partners
- Buildings: Stoke-upon-Trent Town Hall extension; Victoria Coach Station; India of Inchinnan; Hoover Building; several buildings on the Golden Mile

Thomas Wallis (27 May 1872–4 May 1953) was an English architect known for his Art Deco designs and for founding Wallis, Gilbert and Partners.

== Early life ==
Wallis was born in West Norwood and was the son of a bricklayer father and a grocer mother. In 1899, he married his cousin, Edith. They had three children.

== Career ==
Wallis worked for local architect, Sidney R. J. Smith, during the time that Smith had the Tate Gallery commission. Wallis contributed to some of the drawings for the building's design.

In 1900, Wallis was admitted to the Society of Architects and worked independently. In 1901, he returned to work as a draughtsman at the HM Office of Works and Public Buildings to earn more money. He also worked with James Albert Bowden. Buildings they designed included the Bunker, Hythe and Rochdale swimming baths, Barnsley swimming baths, an extension for Stoke-on-Trent Town Hall, St Marylebone Town Hall and the Port of London Authority head office. Their designs were praised for their consideration of how people would work in the spaces.

In 1913, Wallis was promoted to become an Architectural Assistant at the Ministry of Works and ceased working with Bowden.

During World War I, Wallis worked with Sir Frank Baines in the Office of Works, helping to design factories using materials such as concrete and steel for rapid building to support the war effort.

Wallis established Wallis, Gilbert and Partners in 1916. Wallis was influenced by American approaches to employee welfare and production. He worked with the Trussed Concrete Steel Company (Truscon), based in Michigan, for ten years. Collaborating with Truscon enabled Wallis to get around rules against architects engaging in commercial activities.

Wallis was made a Fellow of the Society of Architects in 1920. He was one of its four vice presidents when it merged with the Royal Institute of British Architects (RIBA) in 1925 so was automatically also made a fellow of that organisation. He served on various committees for the RIBA.

== Architectural style ==
Wallis described his style, which featured large, adaptable spaces behind an elaborate Art Deco façade, as "Fancy". Many other architects were critical of his designs but they were popular with the public. A notable example of his work is the India Rubber Company factory at Inchinnan in Renfrewshire, completed in 1930.

Wallis considered that the façade of a building provided effective advertising for a company and that good design had a positive effect on good workers.

In 1932, Wallis delivered a lecture on Factories at the RIBA. Following the lecture, he defended his architectural approach in a conversation with Charles Herbert Reilly and Harry Stuart Goodhart-Rendel, arguing that offices attached to factories should receive as much architectural consideration as offices in cities.

== Personal life and death ==
Wallis had affairs that threatened his marriage and by 1933, caused its end. From this point, he lived with his secretary Doris Rudland, who was 28 years younger. In 1947, after Edith's death, Thomas and Doris married. In 1953, they moved to Worthing. He died soon after the move, on 4 May 1953.
