= List of listed buildings in Inchinnan, Renfrewshire =

This is a list of listed buildings in the parish of Inchinnan in Renfrewshire, Scotland.

== List ==
Name	Location	Date Listed	Grid Ref. (Note: Sometimes known as OSGB36, the grid reference (where provided) is based on the British national grid reference system used by the Ordnance Survey. • "Guide to National Grid". Ordnance Survey. • "Get-a-map". Ordnance Survey.)	Geo-coordinates	Notes	LB Number (Note: Historic Environment Scotland assign a unique alphanumeric identifier to each designated site in Scotland, for listed buildings this always begins with "LB", for example "LB12345".)	Image
Town Of Inchinnan Farm, Greenock Road, Inchinnan				55°53′11″N 4°25′51″W	Category C(S)	12729	Upload Photo
Inchinnan Bridge Over Black Cart Water, (Part In Renfrew Parish)				55°52′50″N 4°24′42″W	Category A	12732	Upload another image See more images
India of Inchinnan (Dunlop Limited) Office Range				55°53′11″N 4°26′25″W	Category A	13459	Upload Photo
Inchinnan New Parish Church, Early Gravestones				55°53′21″N 4°25′59″W	Category B	13049	Upload Photo
Northbar House Inchinnan				55°53′33″N 4°25′51″W	Category A	12730	Upload Photo
Former Park Parish Church, (Now A Hall), Broomlands, Old Greenock Road				55°53′29″N 4°26′20″W	Category C(S)	12731	Upload another image

== Key ==
The scheme for classifying buildings in Scotland is:

- Category A: "buildings of national or international importance, either architectural or historic; or fine, little-altered examples of some particular period, style or building type."
- Category B: "buildings of regional or more than local importance; or major examples of some particular period, style or building type, which may have been altered."
- Category C: "buildings of local importance; lesser examples of any period, style, or building type, as originally constructed or moderately altered; and simple traditional buildings which group well with other listed buildings."

In March 2016 there were 47,288 listed buildings in Scotland. Of these, 8% were Category A, and 50% were Category B, with the remaining 42% being Category C.
