= Saint Conval =

- Born: c. 570; Ireland
- Died: c. 630 (aged 60); Scotland
- Venerated in: Catholic Church; Eastern Orthodox Church
- Canonized: Pre-Congregation
- Feast: 28 September

Saint Conval (Conwall) (died c.630) was an Irish-born missionary who, according to legend recorded in the Aberdeen Breviary, as he was praying on the sea shore "to be borne, by whatsoever means, to the regions beyond the sea", was miraculously carried by the stone he stood on across the Irish Sea to Inchinnan in Scotland. He was active in the Kingdom of Strathclyde in the area of East Renfrewshire, where there were “Conval wells” in Barrhead and Thornliebank. He is believed to have founded churches at Inchinnan, Pollokshaws and Fereneze (near Barrhead). His bones were preserved in an impressive sarcophagus at the Inchinnan church.

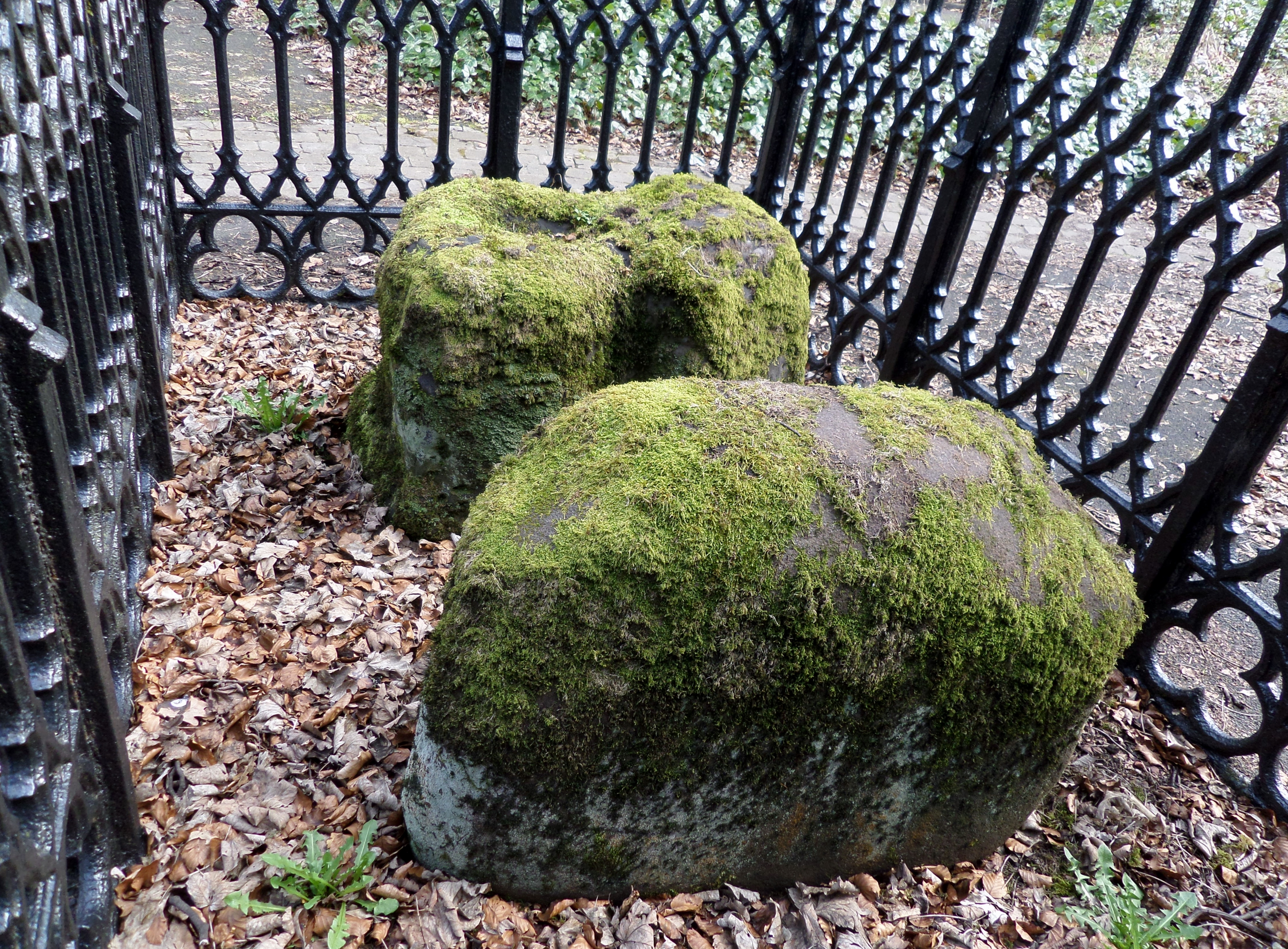
"St Conval's Chariot", behind the Argyll Stone.

The Aberdeen Breviary records traditions that he was a disciple of Kentigern in Glasgow, but this may have originated from 12th century bishops seeking to bring the Inchinnan church under their jurisdiction. Traditionally, Conval was buried at Inchinnan. In the 12th century David I of Scotland gave the Knights Templar a church in Inchinnan dedicated to Saint Conval, it was replaced by 'Hallows Church' in 1900, then demolished in 1965 for the extensions of Abbotsinch airfield into Glasgow Airport.

A stone, thought to be the base of an early Christian cross, is protected by cast iron enclosure near the bridge at Inchinnan, and is known as "St Conval's Chariot" which supposedly brought Saint Conval from Ireland to Inchinnan. There is a legend that pilgrims drank water gathered in a hollow in the stone for its healing properties, and that the adjacent stone was the pediment of the cross.

He is a Catholic and Orthodox saint, feast day 28 September.
