= Gillette Corner =

Coordinates: 51.4841°N 0.3275°W

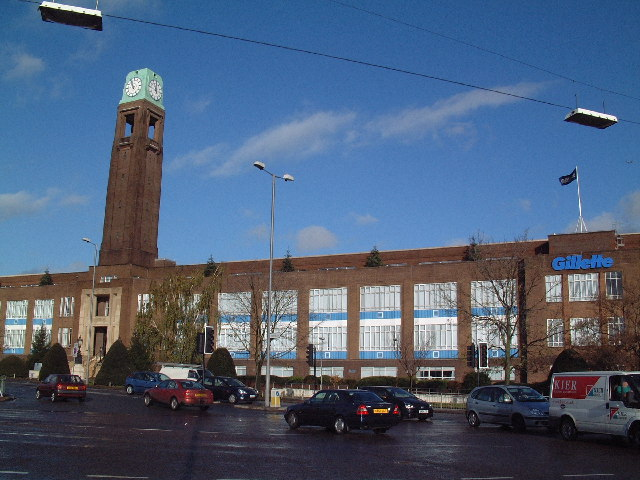
- The main, east front, of the Gillette Building at Gillette Corner

- Location within Greater London
- OS grid reference: TQ162774
- London borough: Hounslow
- Ceremonial county: Greater London
- Region: London
- Country: England
- Sovereign state: United Kingdom
- Police: Metropolitan
- Fire: London
- Ambulance: London
- London Assembly: South West

Gillette Corner is a crossroads in west London. It is where a straightened medieval route Syon Lane (B454) crosses the triple carriageway of the Great West Road A4 and is the western end of the West Cross business district (which has an older, more ambiguous name, the Golden Mile). A disused name for the neighbourhood is Syon Hill.

== Place name ==
It is very locally used as a placename (toponym) (Note: Such as in a large supermarket and informal football facility) interchangeably with Syon Lane and formerly, for a time, Syon Hill. (Note: Supporting this: "Syon Hill House belonged to the Duke of Buckingham in the late 17th century") As with Osterley to the east and north these terms are the upper hinterland of the historic parish of Isleworth, centred to the south. A projection of Brentford begins a short distance to the south-east. Osterley is increasingly seized upon (over a wider area), due to its associations with and origins in the elaborate, very verdant traditional home of the Earls of Jersey, Osterley Park.

== Syon Lane ==
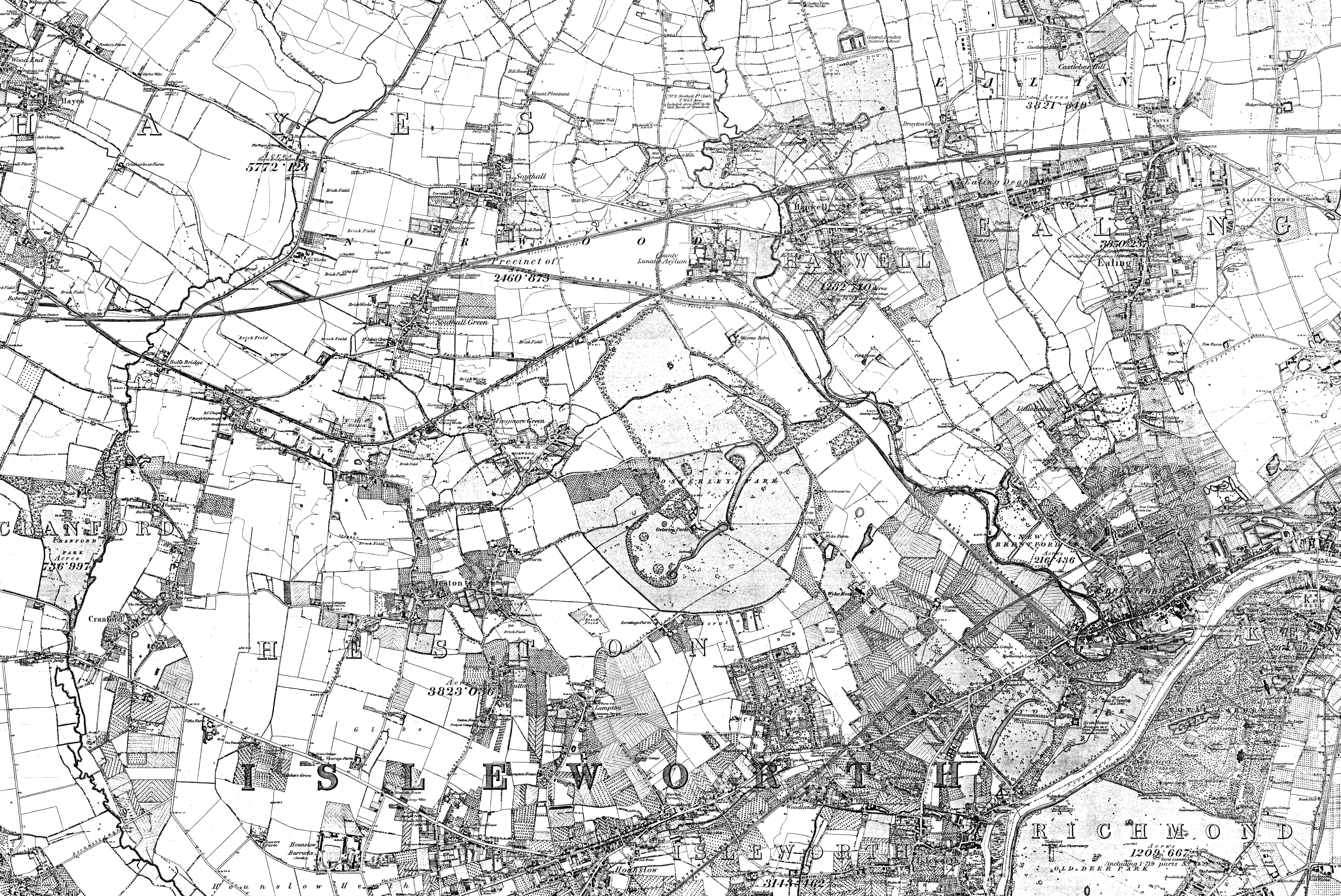
The lane in about 1880 lacking the Great West Road.

Syon Lane was turnpiked in 1767 and straightened twelve years later. A map seeking to show the early 19th century layout of Cranford, Heston and Isleworth moments before their large central and north-western open fields were, as documented, legally privatised (enclosed), in the Victoria County History shows the various lanes and extent of settlement, which was focussed on the Roman London-westward road, kept up as a road locally today. The accompanying narrative states the lanes were all medieval linking the several hamlets. Syon Lane ran past land featuring Wyke House then after a fork, stately Osterley Park on its east side to Southall, the parish to the north. The fork to the north was for a winding lane west, via the depopulated hamlet of Scrattage (today residential Osterley) towards Heston. Syon Lane here had its own hamlet of a perhaps depleted estimate of eight buildings, Syon Hill, which lay just south of Gillette Corner.

== Land use and architecture ==
Gillette Corner marks the western end of the Great West Road's landmark manufacturing sites and office headquarters – dubbed the "Golden Mile" of the 1930s, with Art Deco and modernist design features. It was adapted for the dystopian Brave New World of that decade. Directly north east set behind the main road's characteristic sparse but long line of trees is the 'Gillette Building'. It is a grade II listed Art Deco style office with workshop floors and outbuildings, designed by Sir Banister Fletcher, incorporating a high brick tower surmounted by a four-faced neon-illuminated clock. As this tall structure sits on high ground it represents a prominent local landmark and can be seen from afar, day and night. From the early 1930s until the early 21st century it was the European headquarters of the Gillette Company, of Boston, Massachusetts. In 1958 the buildings employed over 1,000 people. Beyond it is a Tesco hypermarket, several buildings east is the headquarters of media company Sky.

On the Northwest corner of the junction, now a petrol station site, stood the Better 'Ole transport cafe from the 1920s to the 1950s. This was named after and contained a mural based on a World War 1 cartoon series by artist Bruce Bairnsfather. https://www.flickr.com/photos/finlandia_175/4863699681/in/photostream/lightbox/

== Public transport ==
South is Syon Lane railway station. The nearest tube stations are Boston Manor and Osterley, and it is regularly served by H91 and H28 buses.

== Gillette building ==
The Bonnington Group was granted planning permission by the London Borough of Hounslow to develop the building into a hotel and small business park, which will add to the West Cross area, of which Gillette Corner forms the western end. Work has not yet started and the site was sold to a holding company, Gillette Corner Holdings, in 2013.

== Gallery ==
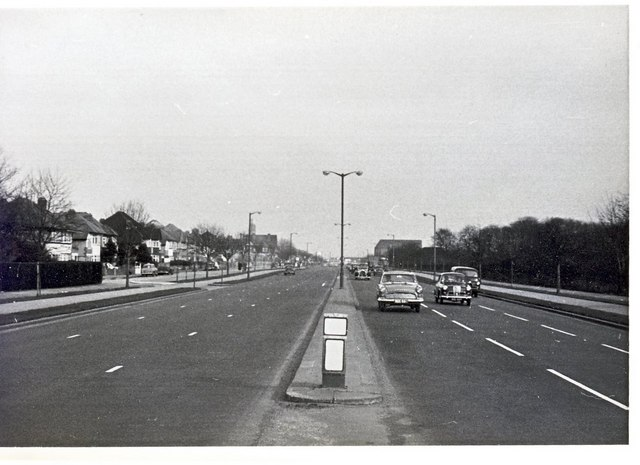
Image from the western approach, in 1958.

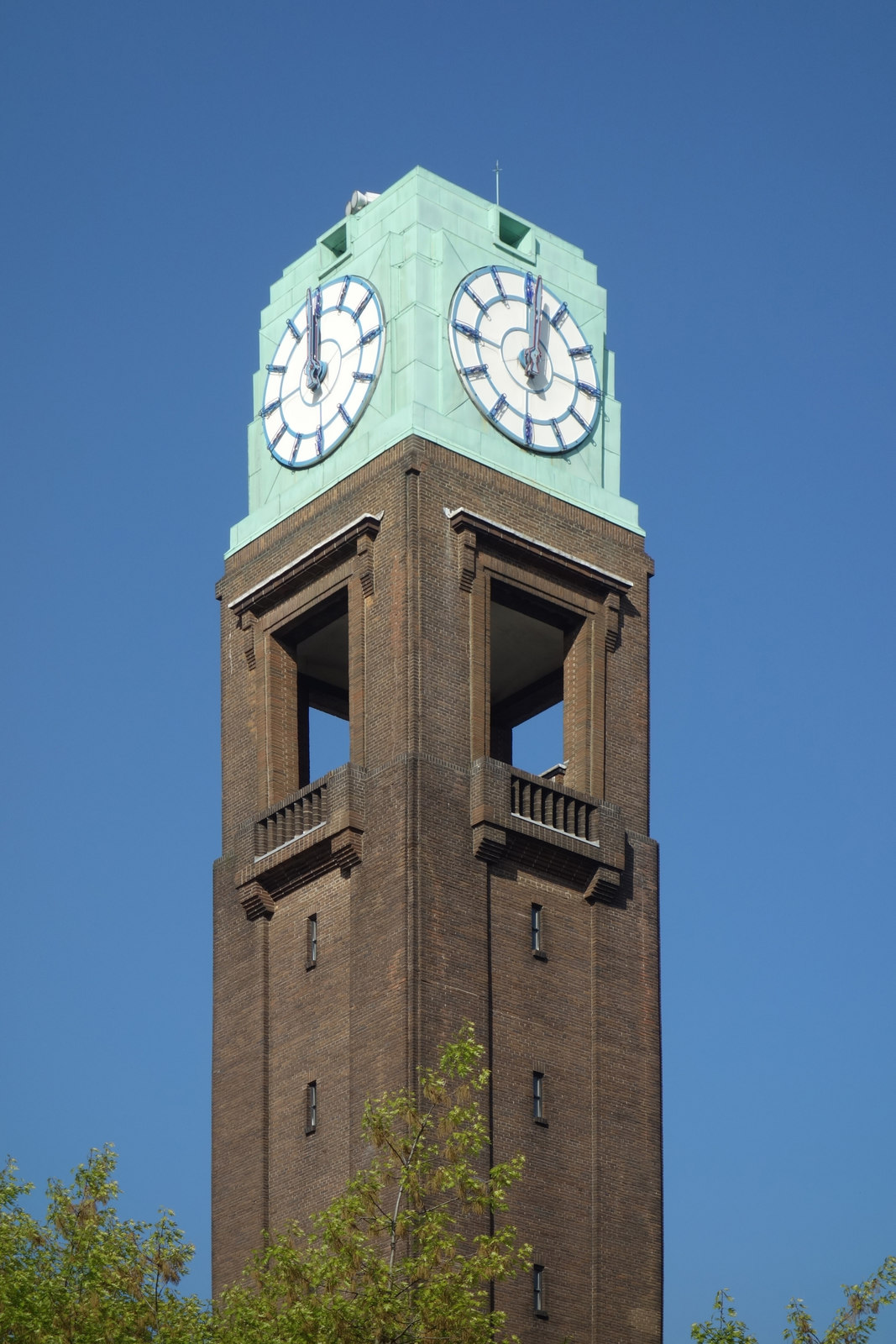
Illuminated clock tower set in the centre of the former Gillette building
