= Golden Mile (Brentford) =

Stretch of road in London, United Kingdom

Coordinates: 51.4853°N 0.3208°W

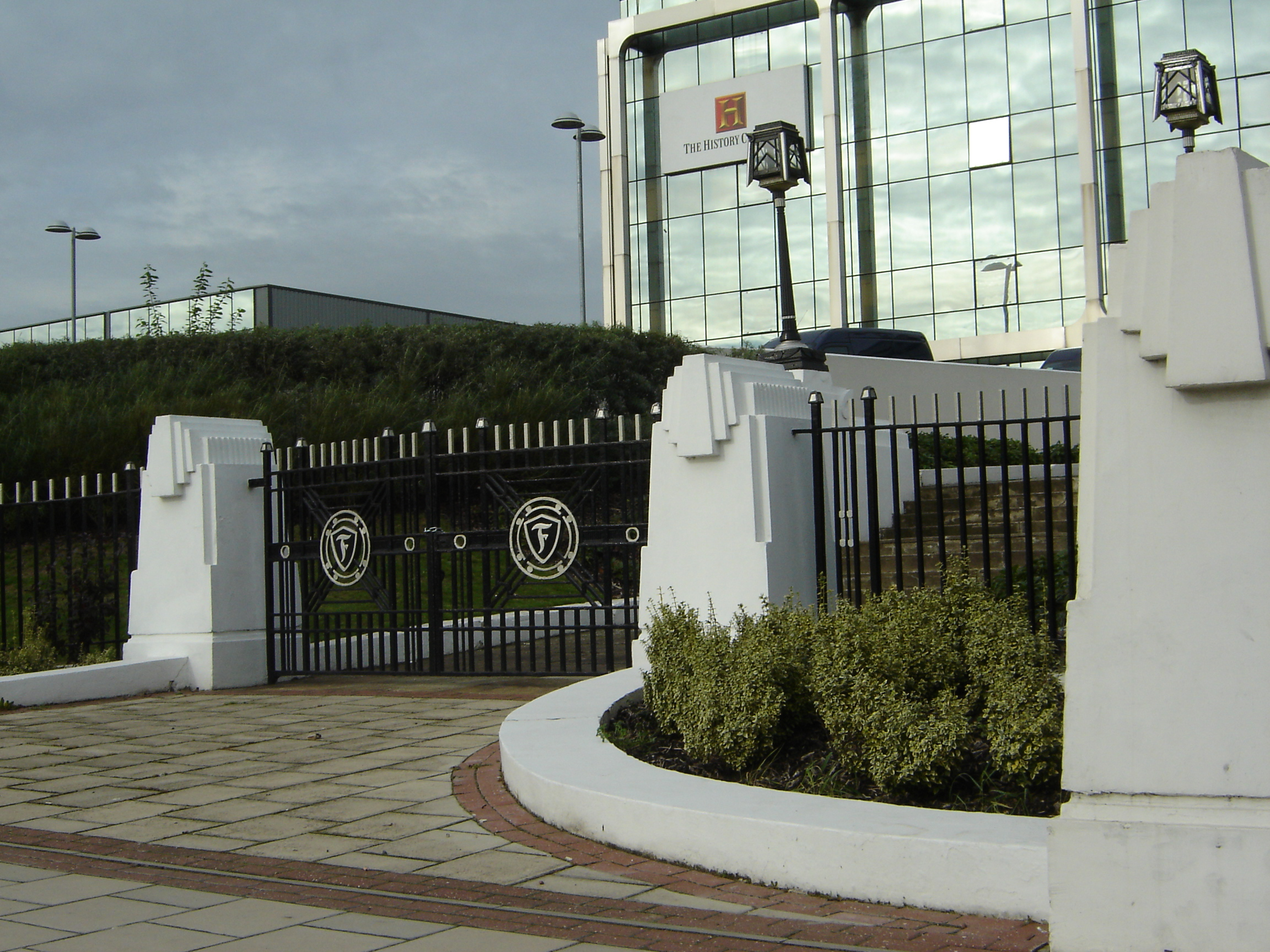
The gates and part of the exterior railings of the former Firestone factory, all that remains of the demolished buildings.

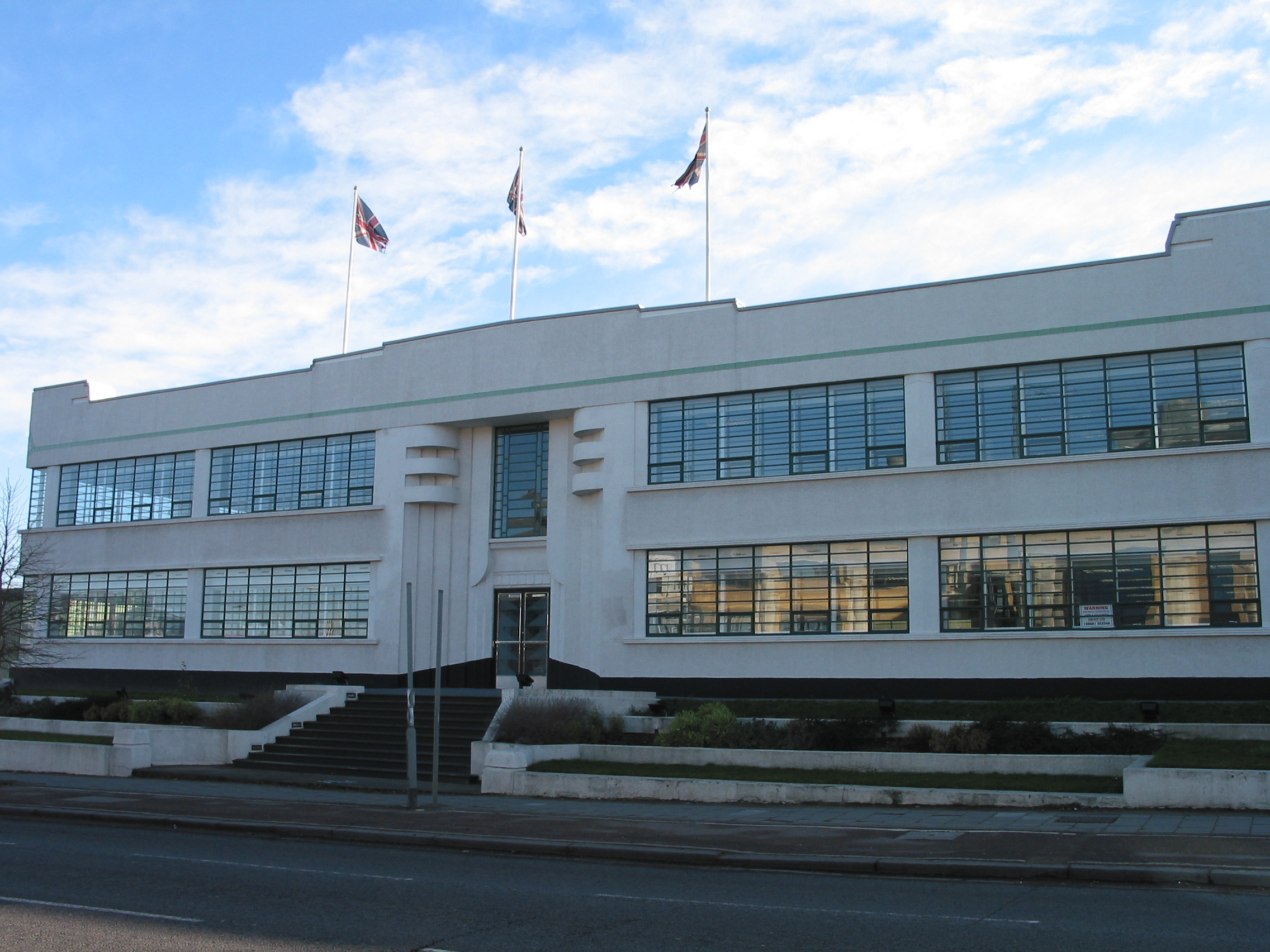
The frontage of the Coty Cosmetics factory on the Golden Mile portion of the Great West Road, Brentford. Designed by Wallis, Gilbert and Partners.

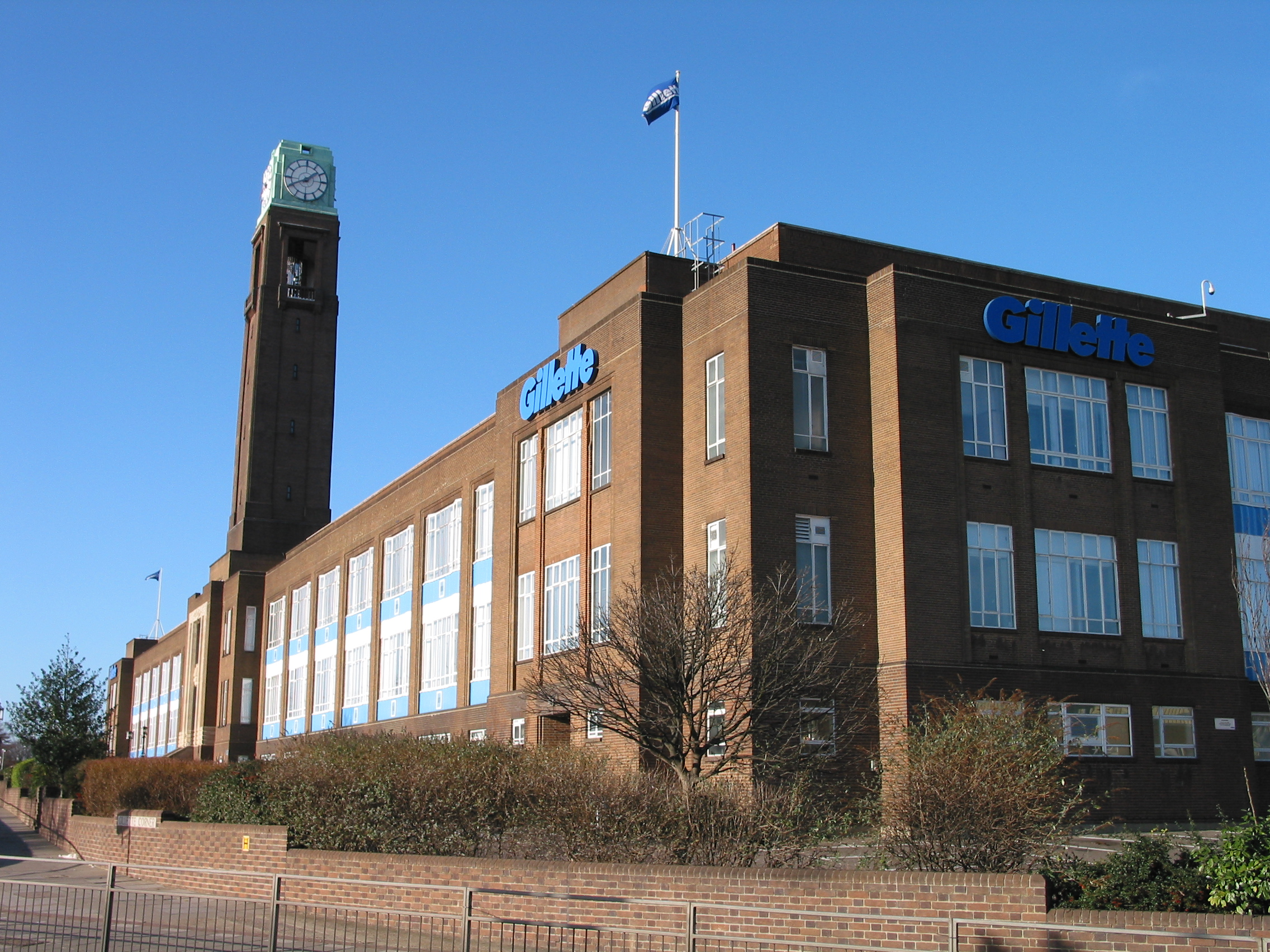
The Gillette Factory on the Golden Mile

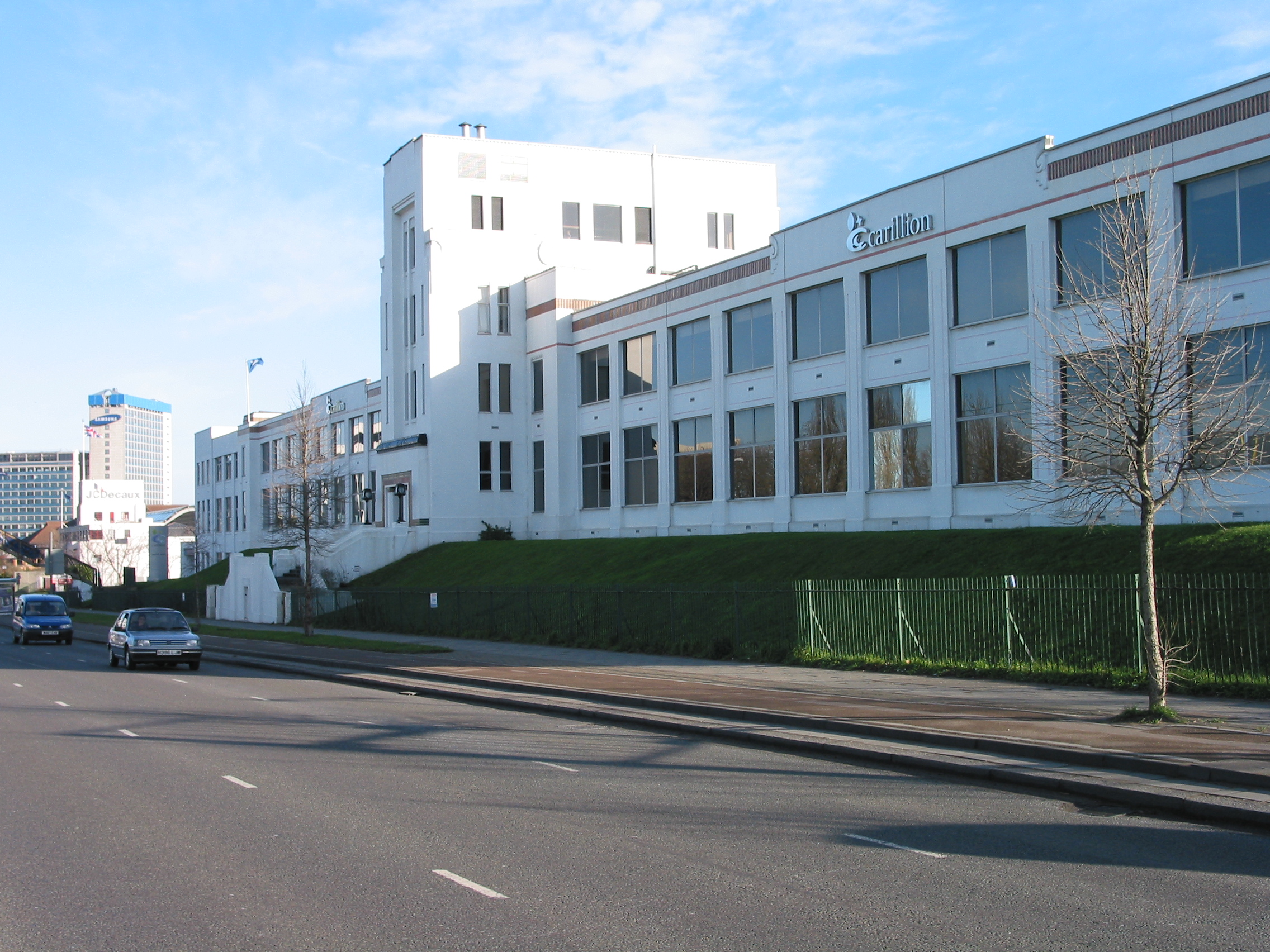
The frontage of the Pyrene Building on the Golden Mile portion of the Great West Road, Brentford. Designed by Wallis, Gilbert and Partners.

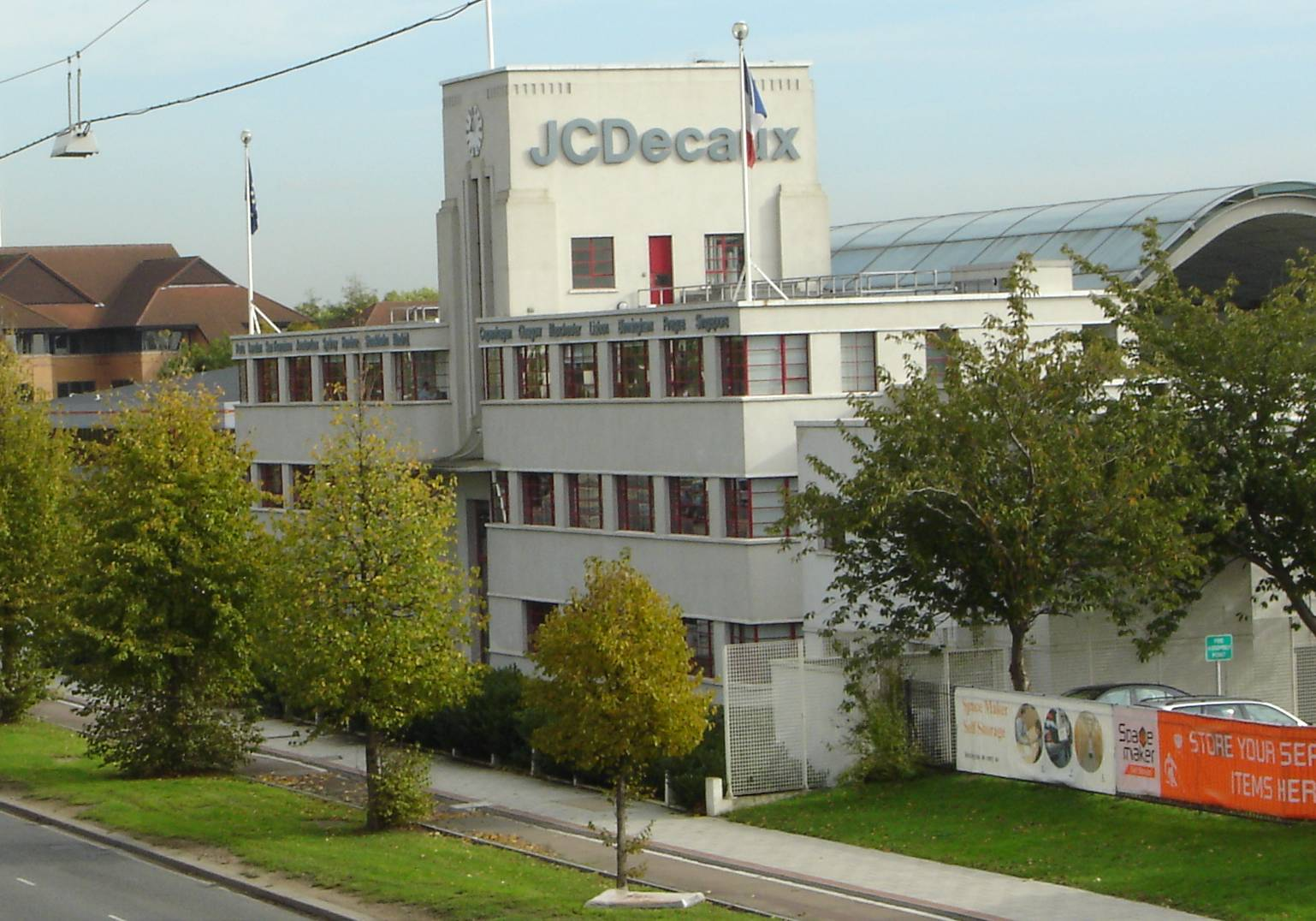
The restored frontage of the former Currys office building, now occupied by JCDecaux.

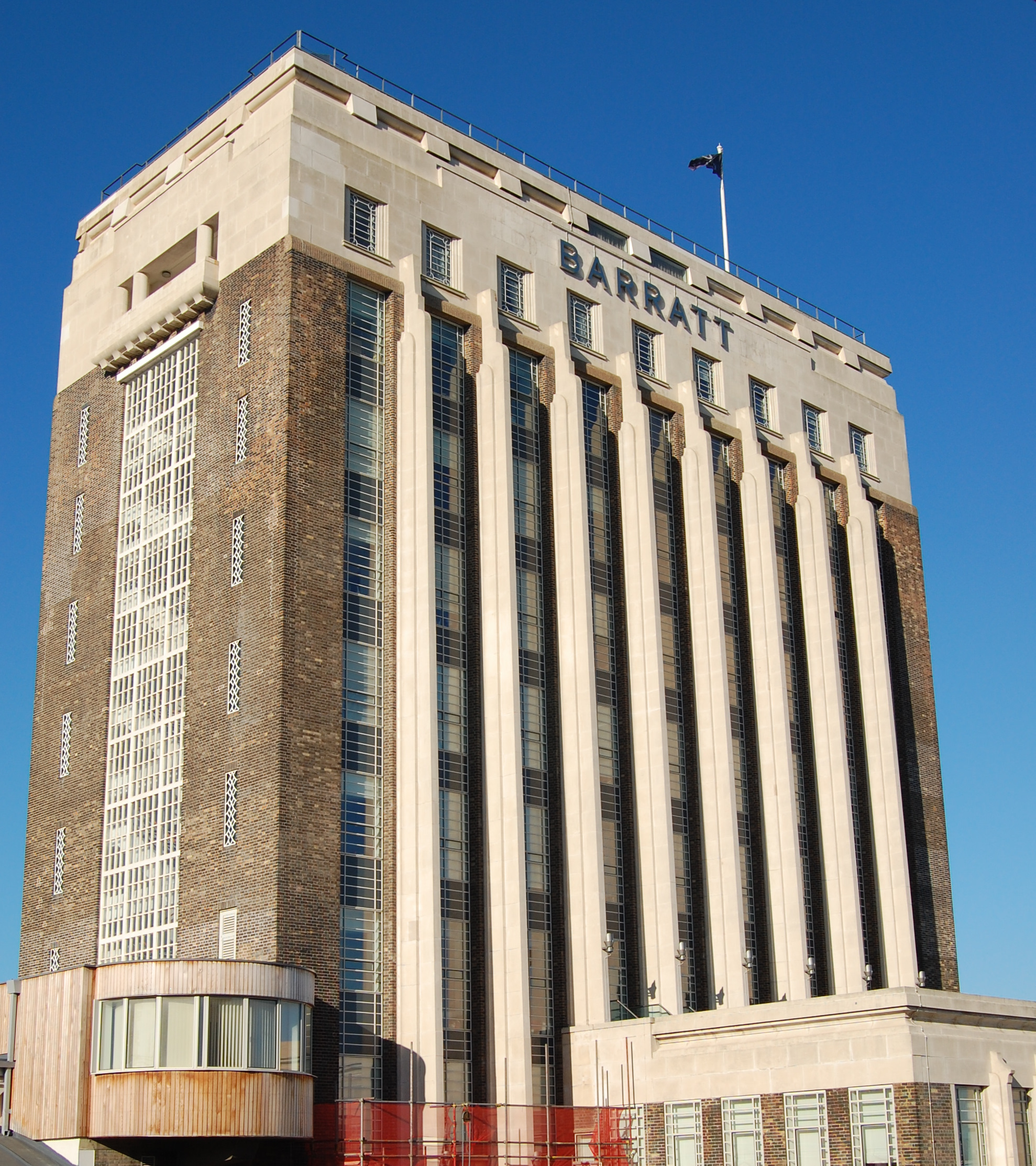
Wallis House, originally designed by Wallis, Gilbert and Partners, and in 2008 the conversion to residential development was designed by Assael Architecture.

The Golden Mile is a stretch of the Great West Road north of Brentford running west from the western boundary of Chiswick in London, United Kingdom.

It was so called due to the concentration of industry along this short stretch of road. This section of the Great West Road was opened in 1925 in order to bypass the notoriously congested Brentford High Street and several factories of architectural merit were rapidly built along the road to take advantage of both the good communications it provided, and the easy availability of land for new buildings. Many examples of the Art Deco architecture remain. However, no commercial buildings could be built further west along the Great West Road (A4) after Syon Lane (Gillette Corner) as the land was owned by the Church Commissioners. Syon Lane railway station was built especially for the workers at these various factories.

Land for the Great West Road was compulsorily purchased. It seems likely that housing was dictated by the Housing, &c. Act 1923, and later Housing Acts, which gave house builders incentives to build houses; also the need to have workers living near the factories.

== Factories ==
These factories included:

- Hudson-Essex Motors was the first factory built in the area, opening in 1926. The factory built Hudson and Essex motor cars, and later Terraplane. Further office premises were added and after the merger of Nash-Kelvinator and Hudson to form American Motors Corporation in 1954 the company became Rambler Motors Limited. Because of their close proximity to the newly built Chiswick flyover the Chiswick junction came to be known as "Hudsons corner." Rambler Motors continued to import and service AMC cars into the 1970s.
- Smith's Potato Crisps Ltd opened in 1927 (brand now owned by PepsiCo, acquired in 1989). Factory rebuilt and expanded in 1930 with colonnaded frontage.
- The Firestone Tyre Company. Built 1928, designed by Wallis, Gilbert and Partners. It was the first overseas factory built by the Firestone company of America. The building frontage was demolished during a public holiday in August 1980 shortly before a preservation order was due to be served on it to retain the Art Deco architecture. The Art Deco gatehouse was demolished in 2004 to make way for increased parking facilities. The remaining gates, railings, and piers are in a Jazz Modern style and are Grade II listed.
- The Trico Products Windscreen Wiper factory, No. 980, opened in 1928. The Trico business relocated to Pontypool, South Wales in 1992 and the building was demolished. The site, together with the adjacent site, Maclean's toothpaste factory (then owned by Rank Audio-Visual) to its east, was to be used for the UK headquarters of Samsung. The 1997 Asian financial crisis prevented this, and the site now houses the headquarters building of GlaxoSmithKline, also known simply as "GSK".
- Leonard Williams Ltd.. No. 971, (Packard Cars Concessionaire) in 1929
- Jantzen Knitting Mills Factory, opened in 1931
- Sperry Gyroscope Company Limited Factory, opened in 1931
- Coty Cosmetics Factory, No. 941, designed by Wallis, Gilbert and Partners opened in 1932. The building now operates as BMI Syon Clinic.
- The Macleans Factory opened in 1932 (brand acquired in 1938 by Beecham, now owned by GlaxoSmithKline). Macleans was founded in 1919 by Alex C Maclean to produce 'own-brand' products for chemists. "Did you Maclean your teeth today?"
- The Gillette Factory, designed by Sir Banister Flight Fletcher in 1936–1937. Gillette stopped using this factory in April 2006, moving production to Poland. The building is as of 2013 undergoing conversion into a mixed use complex with a hotel and residential apartments.
- The Pyrene Fire Extinguisher Company, No. 981, built between 1929 and 1930, designed by Wallis, Gilbert & Partners.
- Wallis House, built between 1936 and 1942 originally for Simmonds Aerocessories, designed by Wallis, Gilbert and Partners. Named after the architect, Thomas Wallis. Latterly used by Beecham Pharmaceuticals as Beecham House. Assael Architecture was commissioned by the Barratt Group to convert and restore the Listed building and redevelopment took place between 2005 and 2008 into apartments, retaining the basic fascia, although with a new partially glass entrance enclosure, and reglazed windows replacing the Crittall originals.
- The Currys Factory and head office, No. 991, built in 1936, now Grade II listed, front office building now restored by Foster & Partners between 1997 and 2000 for JCDecaux
- Henly's Car Showroom (Studebaker and Jaguar) with a distinctive tower – on the east side of the Smith's Crisps factory – opened in 1937 and later became a warehouse for Martini, and following redevelopment after a fire in 1989 retaining the tower, an office for Data General, then EMC Corporation
- Harvey's Wines, who had their own railway line to deliver goods from Bristol.
- MacFarlane Biscuit Factory, behind the Gillette building (off Syon Lane North) (Demolished in the 1980s and now a Tesco Supermarket and the HQ of Sky.)

This stretch of road included an illuminated, animated, advertising sign known to many drivers coming into London on the M4 motorway. The sign, showing a bottle of Lucozade emptying into a glass, was on the wall of what was the Lucozade factory, which opened in 1953 and was demolished in late 2004. The sign was removed to Gunnersbury Park Museum in September 2004 after a brief campaign to preserve it in situ. A replica was subsequently installed, then controversially removed at the end of 2015 and replaced with a digital billboard. Another memorable animated signage was of a female diver advertising Jantzen swimwear.

== See also ==
- Syon Lane railway station
