= Firestone Building (Gainesville) =

Historic building in Gainesville, Florida

Coordinates: 29.6522°N 82.3281°W

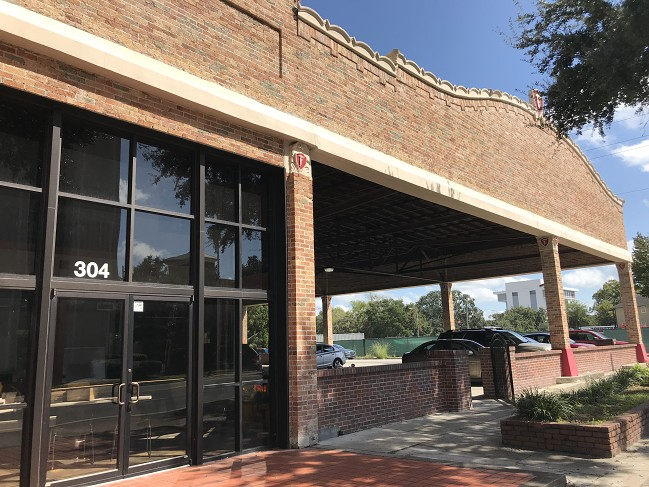
Front face of Gainesville Firestone building on University Avenue side

The historic Firestone Building in downtown Gainesville, Florida is located on West University Avenue (SR 26) at the intersection on NW 3rd Street.

== History ==
It was built in 1927 for the Firestone Tire and Rubber Company until it was abandoned in the 1950s when the economy dipped.

== Renovations ==
The building sat empty for over 40 years before Phoebe Cade Miles, daughter of Florida physician, professor and inventor Robert Cade, and board president of the Cade Museum of Creativity and Invention, bought the Firestone building with her husband and its annex in 2008.

Beginning with the area next door, the couple spearheaded a renovation project that was completed in 2012. They enlisted the help of father-son team Joyner Construction to complete the rehabilitation.

On May 8, 2015, the project earned an Honorable Mention for Adaptive Reuse at the Florida Trust for Historic Preservation's (FTHP) annual awards ceremony held in Miami, Florida. In addition, contractor Joyner Construction was honored for their exceptional work.

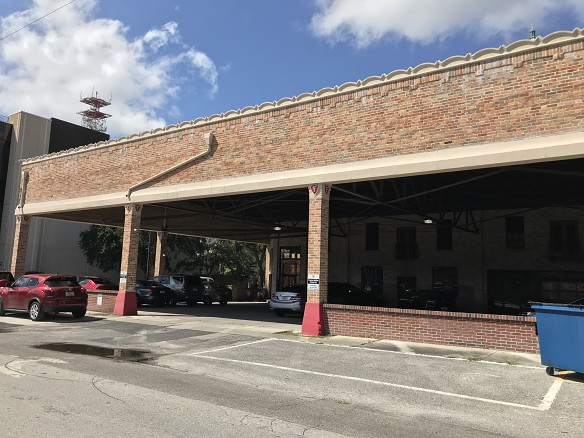
Side face of Gainesville Firestone building on NW 3rd St

== Office space ==
The initial plan for the Firestone building was to use it as an events facility, but it proved to be too costly to build. Thus, after years of incremental renovations, it re-opened as an office space facility in 2014, with a local startup called SharpSpring as its first tenant. The building is now occupied by Gainesville-based technology company Scout GPS/IoT. The two-story facility measures 4,000 square feet and features a balcony, a two-story reception area, and loft-style space.
