= India of Inchinnan =

Coordinates: 55.885°N 4.441°W

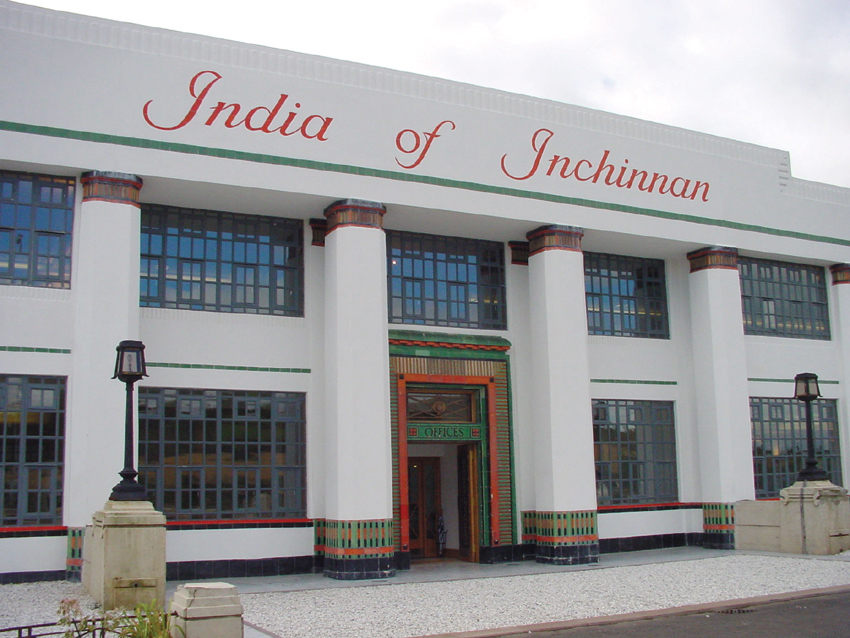
The renovated India of Inchinnan building from the North

India of Inchinnan is now a commercial site in Inchinnan, Renfrewshire, Scotland, that was formerly used for various industrial uses. It includes the former office block of India Tyres of Inchinnan - a Category A listed building in the art deco style, designed in 1930 by Thomas Wallis of Wallis, Gilbert and Partners. The office block was similar in style to Wallis, Gilbert and Partners' Hoover Building in Perivale, London.

== Airship construction ==
The site was first used industrially by William Beardmore and Company, who obtained a contract from the Admiralty to build airships in World War I. Airship components were built at William Beardmore's Dalmuir, Clydebank, factory but more land was needed. William Beardmore therefore obtained land at Inchinnan and built the Inchinnan Airship Constructional Station. Building work started in January 1916 to construct the Station, which occupied 413 acres (1.67 km^{2}). Due to the difficulties of getting staff to this isolated location, the company built 52 houses in Inchinnan, at Beardmore Cottages.

A large airship hangar, the Airship Shed, was built by Sir William Arrol & Co. At 720 feet (220 m) long by 230 feet (70 m) wide and 122 feet (37 m) high, it was of comparable size to the Cardington and Howden Airship sheds, which were contemporary. It was designed to accommodate two Class 23 airships side by side; of the class only R24 was built by Beardmore.

A hydrogen production plant, a bottled hydrogen storage area, and various production shops were also built.

William Beardmore successfully built several airships, Airship No. R24, R27, R34 and the R36.

The Admiralty contract was cancelled in August 1919 and no more orders were received. The station closed on 12 October 1922, and the Airship shed and many other buildings were demolished for scrap.

== India Tyres ==
The major part of the site and some of the buildings, including a large hangar, were purchased by India Tyres in December 1927. The company set about redeveloping it.

Based on a plan of the Airship construction station, the existing hangar appears to have comprised three adjacent shops: the Frame Shop, the Girder Shop and the Car shop. It was reused as a rubber mill building, where the rubber was compounded and the tyres were manufactured, and a linked raw materials store.

Other separate buildings were erected for storage of carbon black and finished products. The carbon black storage silo was separate; by the 1970s it appears to have occupied part of the former hydrogen generation plant / bottled gas storage area.

India Tyres commissioned their Art Deco office block in 1930, strategically located in front of their mill building west of Glasgow on Greenock Road, the A8 road from Edinburgh to Greenock. It is similar in style to Wallis, Gilbert and Partners' Hoover Building in Perivale, London. Construction work was completed, and the building opened in 1931. India Tyres also built two groups of houses to accommodate its workers: "Allands Avenue" and "India Drive". The office block remained in use for its original purpose for some 50 years.

== Renovation ==
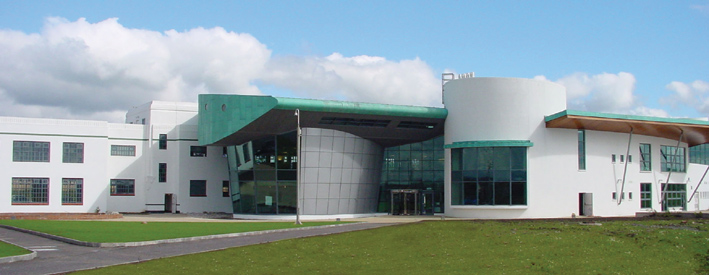
The renovated and extended India of Inchinnan building from the South

The India Tyres office building became vandalised and burnt after India Tyres closed down and vacated the site in 1981. The former India Tyres buildings, with the exception of the office block, were demolished in 1982. Several plans for redevelopment of the by now brown field site by Renfrew District Council's Renfrew Development Agency (RDA), later Renfrew Enterprise, failed to progress.

The India of Inchinnan office block was saved from its dereliction when it was bought, renovated and extended by the software company Graham Technology (now ultimately owned by Verint Systems), whose headquarters were located in the category A listed building. The renovation was completed in 2003. The design by Gordon Gibb of Gibb Architects Ltd keeps the original India Tyres office building but adds a contemporary extension inspired by the airships formerly built there. The roof of the extension is a 1:1 scale replica of a section of the R34 and internal lighting spells out "R34" in morse code. The design won 'Best Re-Use of an Historic Building' at the Scottish Design Awards as well as a commendation in the 'Commercial Interior' Category. In May 2005, this was the only category A listed building in Scotland in Commercial use, although that situation changed when The Wisegroup set up their headquarters at 72 Charlotte Street in Glasgow, in the Category A Listed former Lady and St Francis Secondary School

== Current Use ==
The building is now owned by Verint Systems, housing the business unit previously known as KANA Software before their purchase by Verint in 2014. Prior to this, the building was occupied by the same business unit, under the names Sword Ciboodle and originally Graham Technology. The building is also an office for Getronics, who occupy much of the office section of the ground floor.

== See also ==
- List of Category A listed buildings in Renfrewshire
- List of listed buildings in Inchinnan, Renfrewshire
