= Hoover Building =

Building in London

The Hoover Building
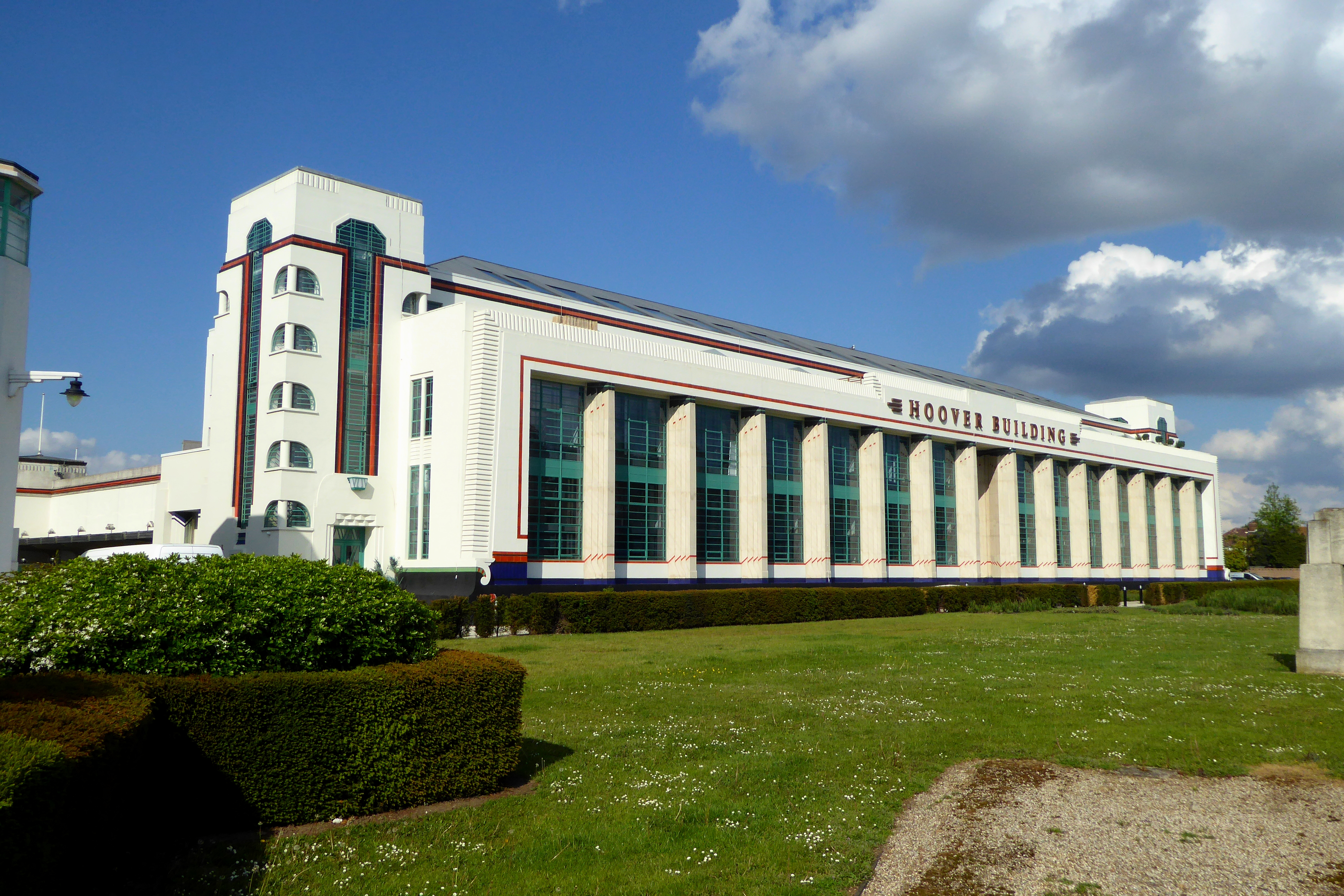
- The Hoover Building

- Location within Greater London

General information
- Location: Western Avenue, UB6 8AT, Perivale, Western Greater London, United Kingdom
- Coordinates: 51.533611°N 0.318889°W
- Groundbreaking: 1931
- Opened: 2 May 1933
- Renovated: 2018
- Owner: IDM Properties

Design and construction
- Architecture firm: Wallis, Gilbert and Partners
- Designations: Grade II* listed

Website
- https://hooverbuilding-ub6.com

The Hoover Building is a Grade II* listed building of Art Deco architecture designed by Wallis, Gilbert and Partners located in Perivale in the London Borough of Ealing. The site opened in 1933 as the UK headquarters, manufacturing plant and repairs centre for The Hoover Company. The building is now owned by IDM Properties and has been converted into apartments.

== History ==
The main building was opened in May 1933 by Lord Rochdale as the UK headquarters for The Hoover Company. This was designed by Wallis, Gilbert and Partners - the same firm that designed the Firestone Tyre Factory in Brentford and Victoria Coach Station in Central London. Thomas Wallis said of the Art Deco design: ’A little money spent in the incorporation of some form of decoration, especially colour, is not money wasted. It has a psychological effect on the worker.’

Soon after the main building was built, plans were drawn up for a manufacturing plant. As demand for Hoover vacuum cleaners began to grow, the factory was extended in the mid-thirties increasing the space to 254,000 square feet (23,597.4 square metres). A two-storey extension was added to the manufacturing plant and another factory was built behind the original building. In 1938, a canteen and recreation centre were completed to the west of the site. It was referred to in the press at this time as a 'Modern Palace of Industry', in contrast to the older factories in the north of England. The firm welcomed visitors to look around the factory.

During its heyday in the 1930s, 1,600 people were employed at the site, which was considered a model factory with regard to worker welfare.

John Betjeman described it as "a sort of Art Deco Wentworth Woodhouse – with whizzing window curves derived from Erich Mendelsohn's work in Germany, and splashes of primary colour from the Aztec and Mayan fashions at the 1925 Paris Exhibition."

During the Second World War the factory was used to manufacture aircraft parts. Vacuum cleaners were still produced at the site, but at a lower output than previously. The buildings were camouflaged to avoid being bombed by German aircraft. The building's staff set up their own Home Guard unit. After the war, which the building survived, another extension was added - a five-storey building to the north of the site.

In 1980 the main building and in 1981 the canteen building were granted a Grade II* listing. The site was described in the list entry as ‘possibly the most significant arterial road factory of its date, and one of the most attractive.’

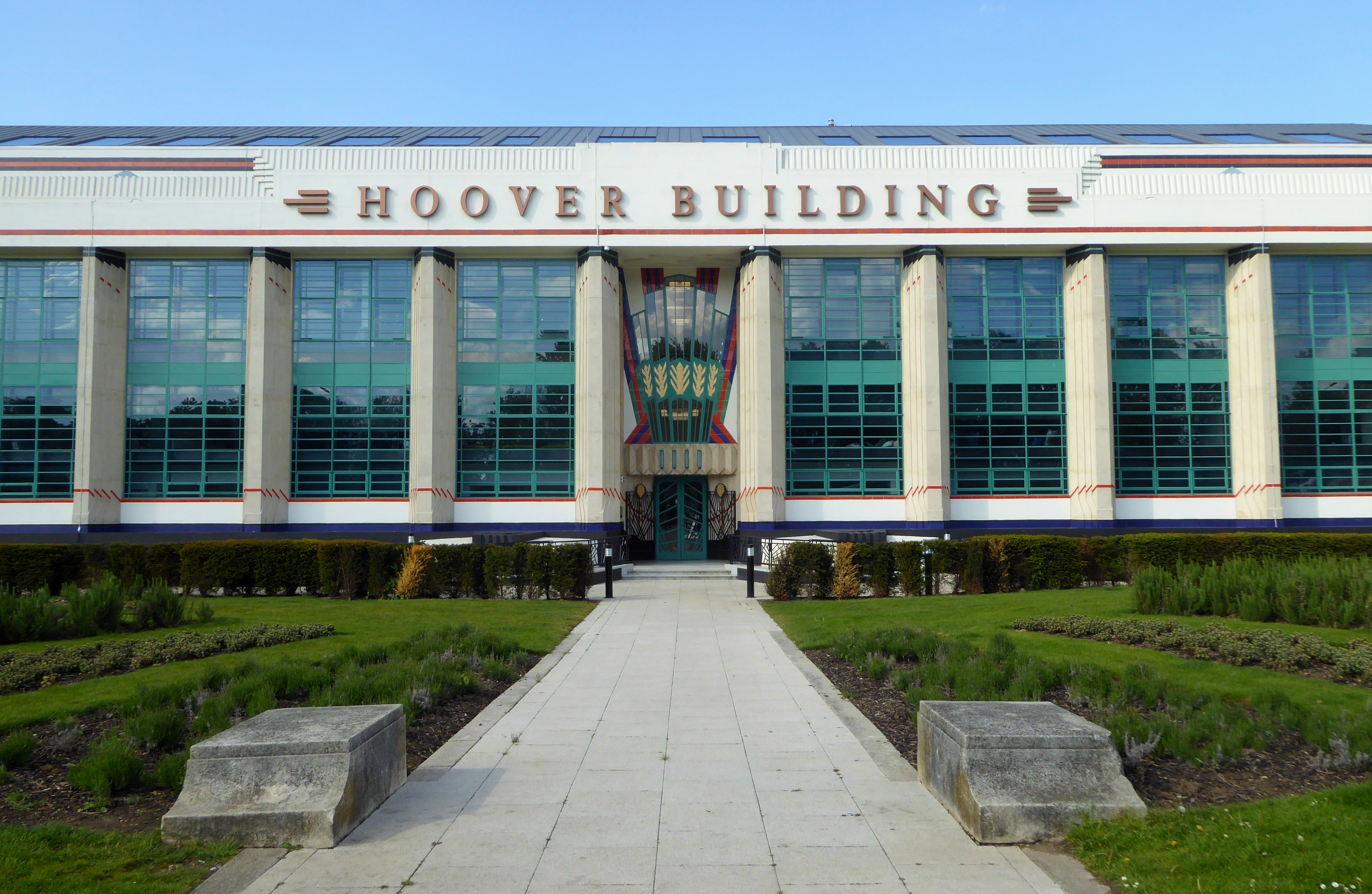
The main building

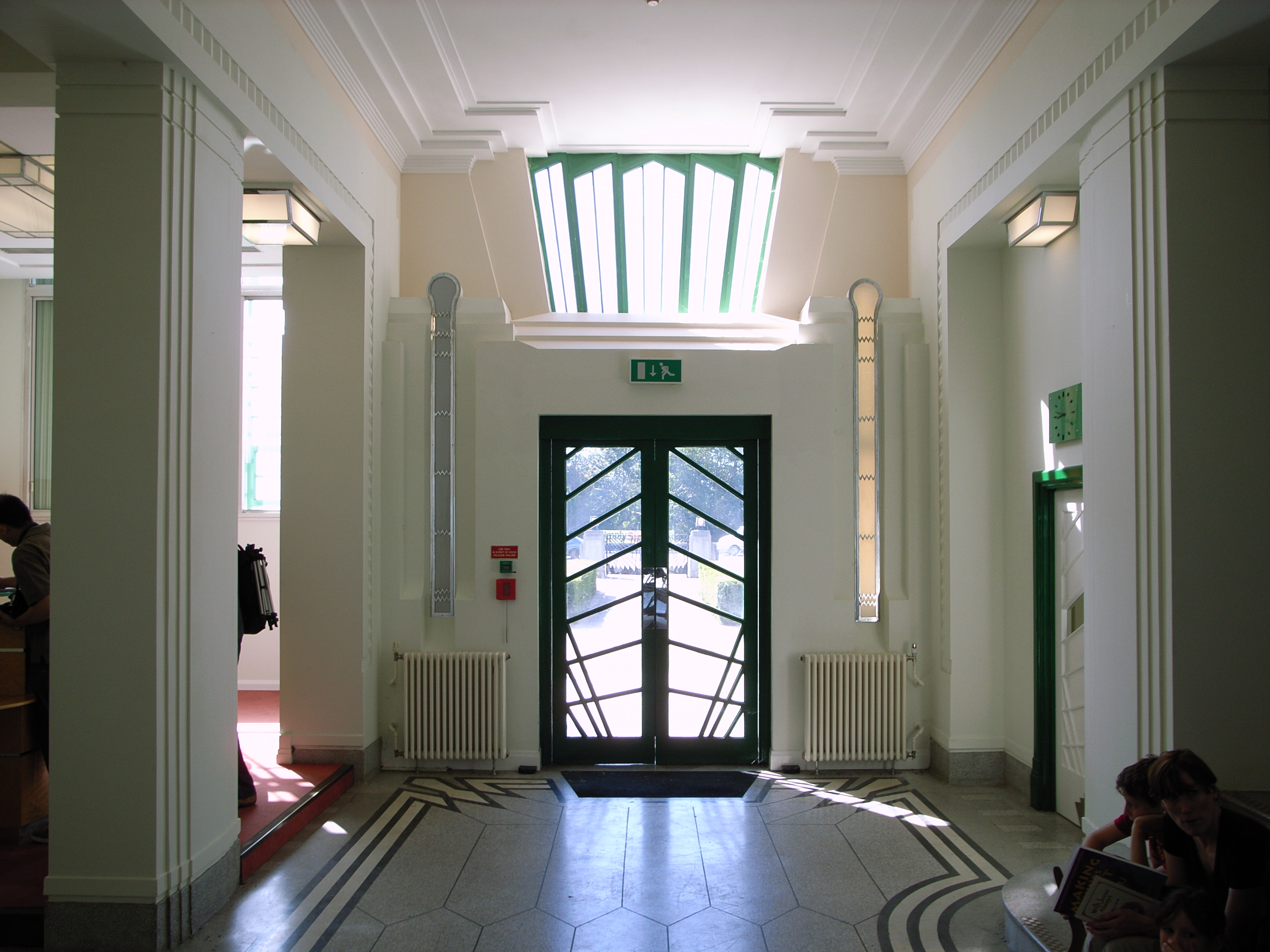
The original entrance to the main building

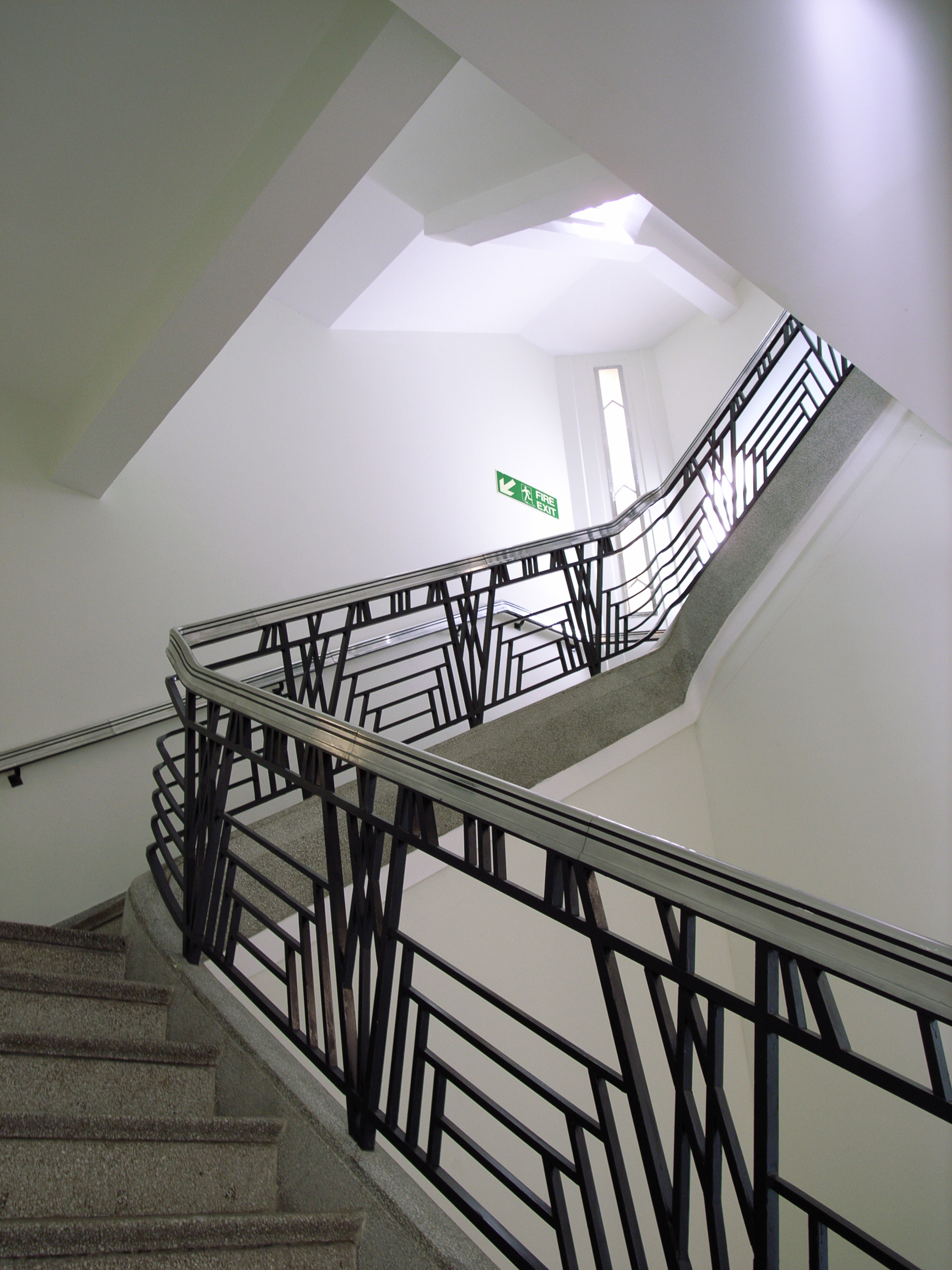
The original staircase in the main building

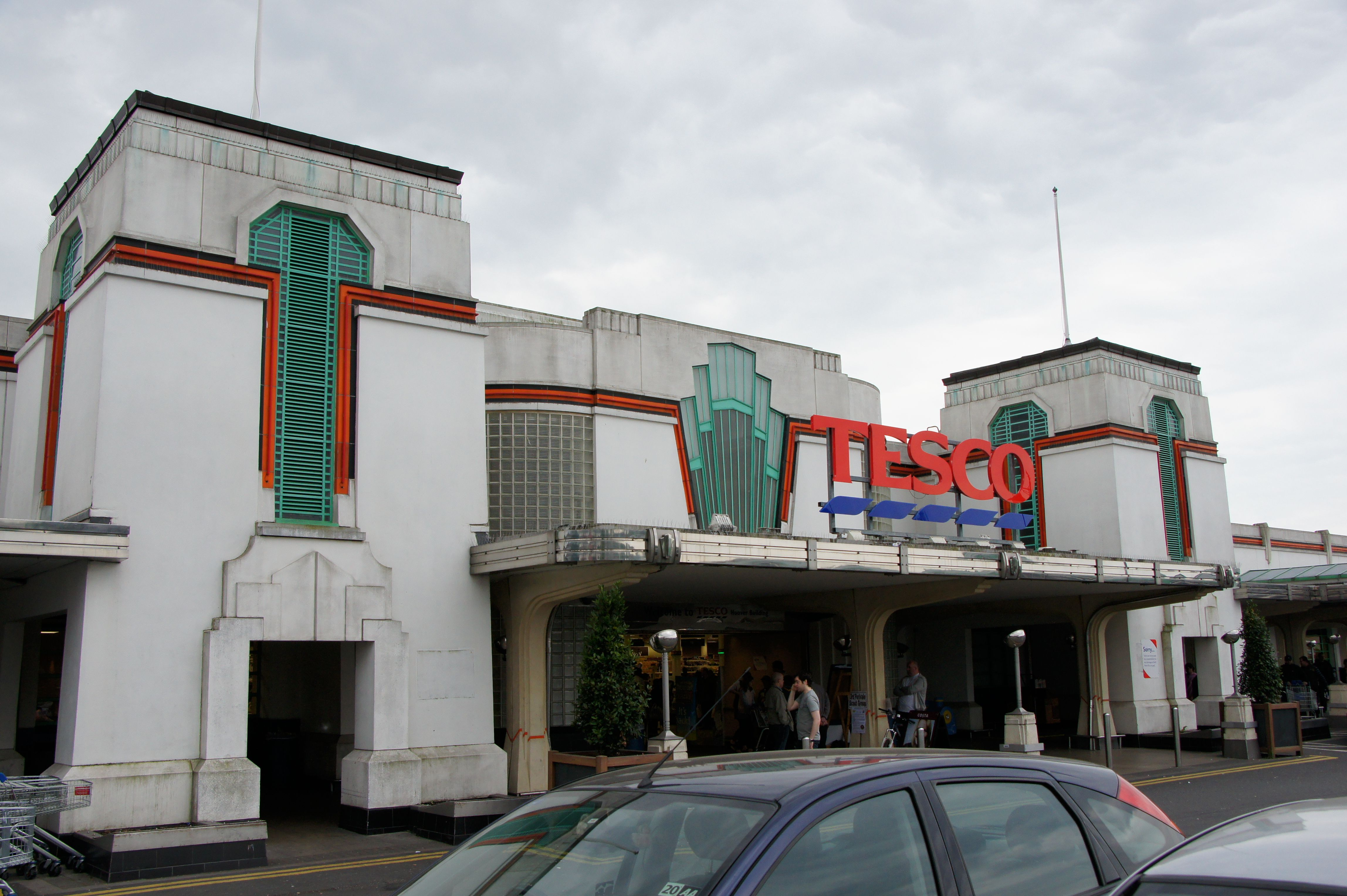
The present day Tesco supermarket housed in the building

In 1989 the supermarket chain Tesco purchased the Hoover Building and sixteen of the seventeen houses that backed onto the Hoover site. The northern parts of the factory site were demolished to make way for a supermarket and the main building was repaired and refurbished to create office space.

After several years of the building's remaining vacant, IDM Properties acquired the Hoover Building in 2015, with plans to redevelop the building into residential accommodation.

In 2017 work commenced to convert the main building into 66 studio, 1, 2 & 3 bedroom apartments, with the addition of a new top floor. This was completed in 2018 by IDM Properties and Interrobang.

== Design ==
The building took on a palatial facade of large columns and recessed glass bay windows. Above the central entrance which was a geometric sunburst pattern, positioned beneath the large “Hoover Limited” lettering.

== Redevelopment ==
The comprehensive renovation by IDM Properties focused on the conservation of the historic fabric and the insertion of a new timber structure, maximising the number of new homes that could be created.

The timber structure forms a mezzanine within the double-height ground floor, creating 14 maisonettes with full-height, Crittall steel windows. The original staircase leads to 21 flats on the first floor and 31 on the second. Many on the second floor have private terraces overlooking the lawn. The 12 flats at the new third floor have been created by replacing the old fibre-cement and steel roof with a zinc standing seam with large rooflights. Two maisonettes incorporate the listed staircases in the two towers that bookend the façade.

Internally, many of the original Art Deco features have been refurbished. The building's original colour scheme is reflected in new Art Deco-style corridors with green interiors and high-waisted dado rails. The light fittings, staircases with wrought-iron banisters and terrazzo lobby floors have all been restored.

== In popular culture ==
In 1980, Elvis Costello recorded a song called "Hoover Factory", which includes a brief description of the building and its position in Greater London. It first appeared on the B-side of Costello's "Clubland" single in 1980, and can now be found as an "extended play" bonus track on CD reissues of his album Get Happy!!. The Hoover Building was also used as a filming location for two episodes of Agatha Christie's Poirot: namely, "The Dream" and "The King of Clubs".

== See also ==
- India Tyre Factory
- Carreras Building
- Firestone tyre factory
