= Inchinnan =

Coordinates: 55.8917°N 4.4386°W

Inchinnan: Scottish Gaelic: Innis Fhionghain
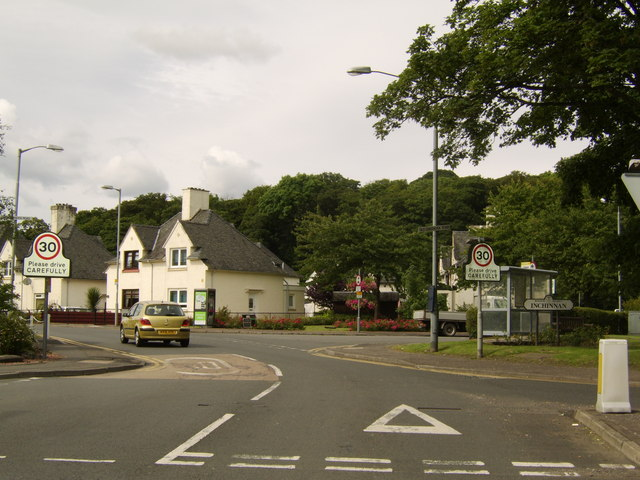
- Inchinnan Village

- Location within Renfrewshire
- Population: 1,820 (2020)
- OS grid reference: NS475691
- Council area: Renfrewshire
- Lieutenancy area: Renfrewshire
- Country: Scotland
- Sovereign state: United Kingdom
- Post town: Renfrew
- Postcode district: PA4
- Dialling code: 0141
- Police: Scotland
- Fire: Scottish
- Ambulance: Scottish
- UK Parliament: Paisley and Renfrewshire North
- Scottish Parliament: Renfrewshire North and West

Inchinnan (/ɪntʃˈɪnən/; Scottish Gaelic: Innis Fhionghain) is a small village in Renfrewshire, Scotland. The village is located on the main A8 road between Renfrew and Greenock, just south east of the town of Erskine.

== History ==
The name of Inchinnan village is derived from the Gaelic word 'Innis', which means an island or low-lying land near a river or stream. The other part of the name is taken from Saint Inan, a 9th-century confessor at Irvine. An ornamental cast iron enclosure near the ford protects "St Conval's Chariot" which is supposedly the stone that brought Saint Conval from Ireland to Inchinnan around 590, and a 12th-century church dedicated to Saint Conval was given to the Knights Templar by David I of Scotland. Another church called 'Hallows Church' replaced it in 1900. The newer church was then replaced by part of the airfield at Abbotsinch. The latest church (Inchinnan Parish) is in the centre of the village. It contains burial stones possibly dating back to around the 9th century. In the same enclosure as St Conval's Chariot, "Argyll's Stone" was supposedly where the 9th Earl of Argyll rested when he was captured in 1685, before he was executed in Edinburgh on the Maiden.

The confluence of the rivers Black Cart and White Cart is situated near Inchinnan. Travelers crossed by a ford and later by ferry. A stone bridge was built to cross the Black Cart and a bascule bridge crosses the White Cart.

In the 1700s there were quarries within the village. The quarries produced high quality freestone right up until the 1900s. In 1809–1812 stone from the quarries built the nearby Black and White Cart bridges.

William Gilmour, farmer of Town of Inchinnan Farm, was the husband of Charlotte Gilmour who stood trial for his murder by arsenical poisoning in 1843.

== Landmarks ==
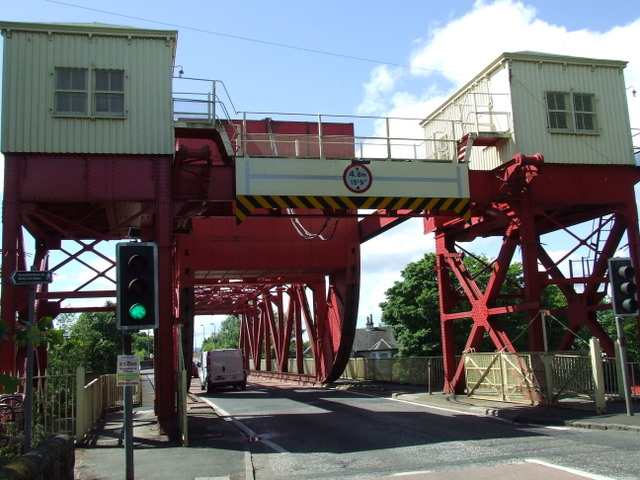
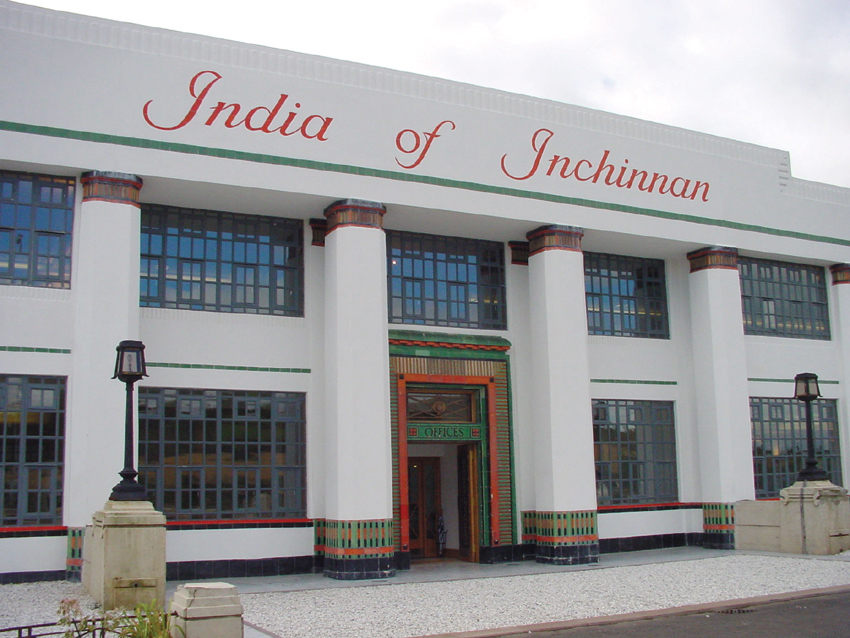
(Left) Bascule bridge crossing White Cart (Right) India Tyres office (1930)

The bascule bridge at the border with Renfrew was replaced in 1923 by a bascule bridge, which was made by Sir William Arrol & Company. It is still capable of opening, as the Doosan Babcock factory at Renfrew requires the capability to move large loads by river. The bridge crosses White Cart Water and onto the River Clyde.

Inchinnan hosts an art deco style category A listed building called India of Inchinnan, designed by the architect Thomas Wallis. It is the former office block of India Tyres factory which occupied the site from 1927 until the early 1980s. It has now been renovated into private offices. The company also built two groups of houses to accommodate its workers. These streets were called Allands Avenue and India Drive. Prior to its use as a tyre factory, the site was used by William Beardmore and Company to build airships in World War I. Several airships, the No's R24, R27, R34 and the R36 were built on this site. The company built 52 houses in Inchinnan, at Beardmore Cottages, to house its workers.

Inchinnan has a large industrial estate within the town. There are a few manufacturing companies left within the area. Some of the companies associated with Inchinnan past and present include: Reekie Machine Tools, Scot Tubes, Gas Measurement Instruments, Bairdswear, Armour Park, Metecno, Aulds and Rolls-Royce. M&Co (Mackays) has its head office at Caledonia House in the industrial estate.

There is a bus depot in Inchinnan which belonged to Arriva Scotland West and before that Western SMT (later Clydeside Scottish). In December 2011, it was announced that Arriva had agreed to sell the company to the independent operator McGill's Bus Services and all of Arriva Scotland West's operations ceased on Monday 26 March 2012.

East of the village beside the A8 road is a spoil tip from a disused ironstone mine. This hillock is now covered with trees. The mine, known as the Blythswood mine was abandoned by 1875.

A palace was situated within the village about 1506. It was built by Matthew, Lord Darnley, second Earl of Lennox. Remains of the building known as Palace of Inchinnan could be seen up to 1710 but have now since been destroyed. It was situated on the border with Erskine; near to Flures Drive in Erskine. An inventory was made of the contents of the palace and chapel around the year 1570. The chapel goods included; two missals, statues of Jesus as a baby, the Virgin Mary and St Anne, with an ivory statue for the hanging chandelier.

Wilhelmina Alexander, famous as Robert Burns' 'The Bonnie Lass of Ballochmyle', is buried in the Old Inchinnan Cemetery near the Black Cart Water. The site has restricted access and is very overgrown.

The Inchinnan Cruising club was established in 1932. It is sited east of the village.

The disused Park or Fulton's Quay stands on the River Clyde in the parish of Inchinnan. It was used privately by the owners of Park House.

== Education ==
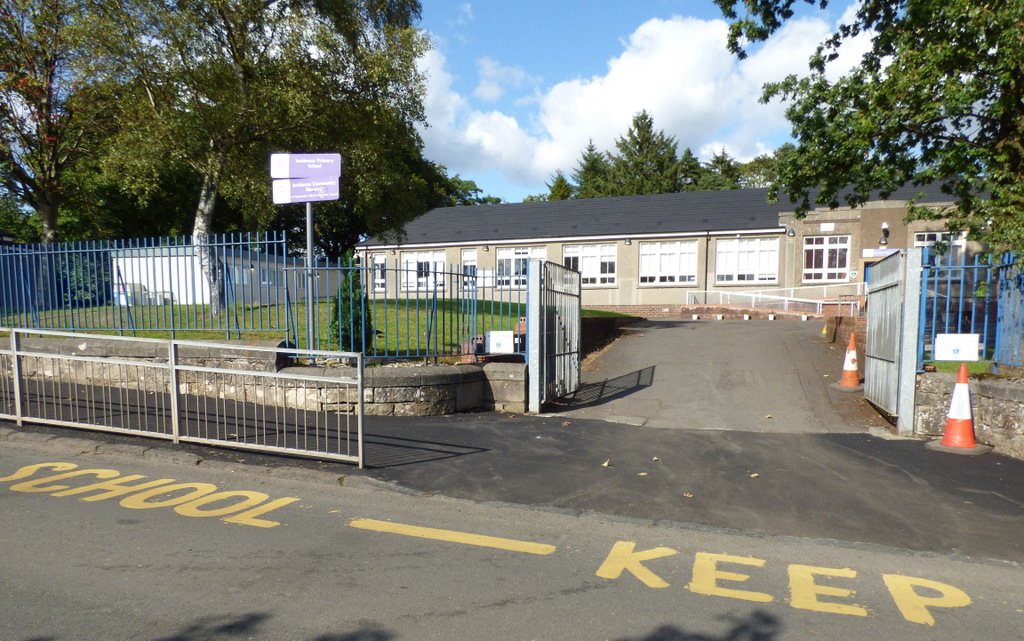
Inchinnan Primary School

Inchinnan Primary school is the only school within the village. It is a non-denominational state school. For secondary education the village falls within the catchment area of Park Mains High School in Erskine. For Roman Catholic denomination education, the nearest primary school is St Anne's in Erskine and Trinity High School in Renfrew is the nearest secondary school. Inchinnan Community Nursery provides pre-school education within the village.

== Transport ==
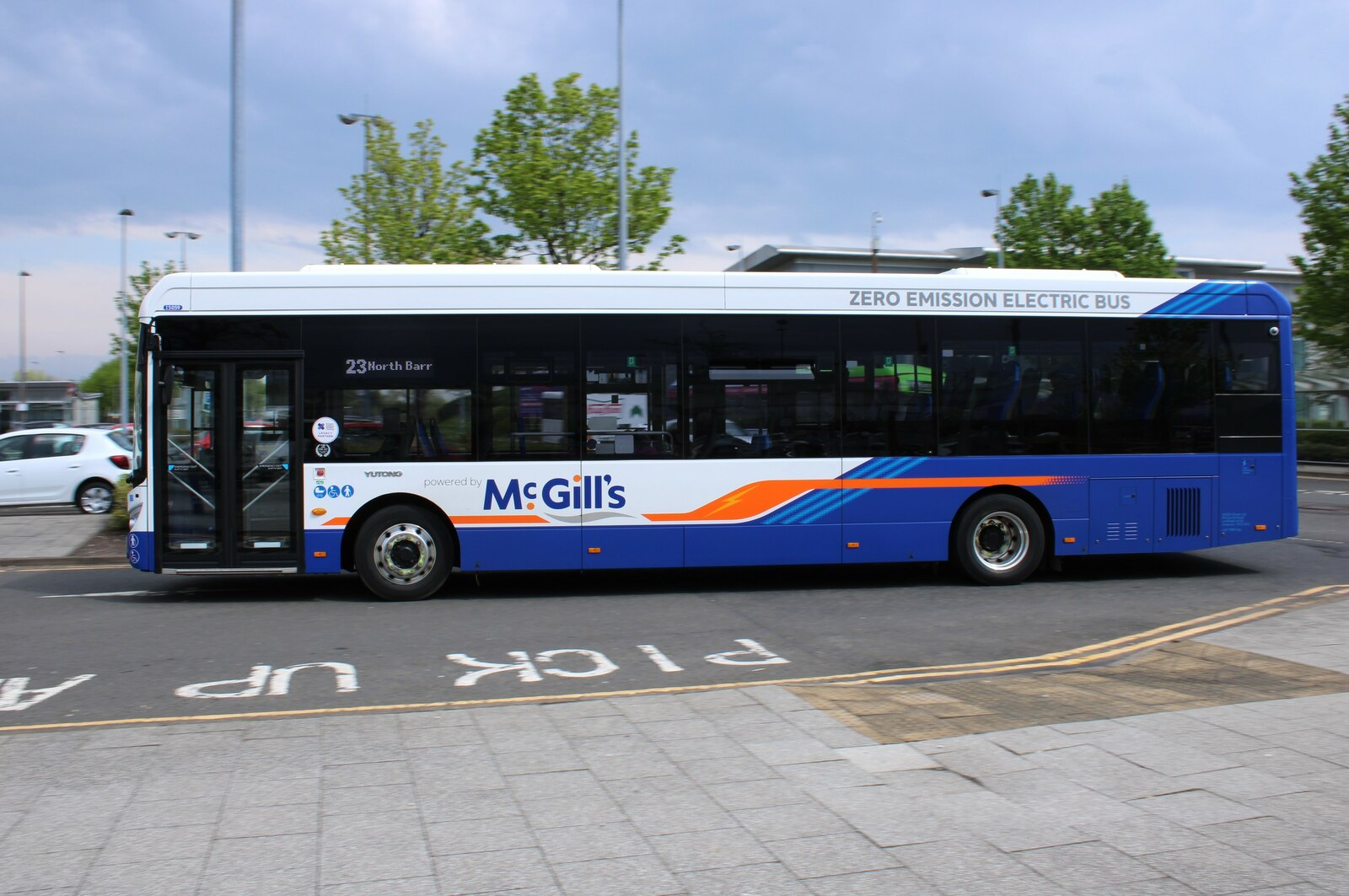
McGill's Buses service 23 bound for North Barr in Erskine departing Braehead bus station

Inchinnan is served by Glasgow Airport, which is located 2 km south of the village. The village has close links to the nearby M8 motorway, A8 road and the Erskine Bridge. Inchinnan is serviced by McGill's Bus Services and previously Arriva Scotland West. Services operate to Glasgow, Paisley, Renfrew, Govan, Erskine, Clydebank and Glasgow Airport.

== Geography ==
Inchinnan is situated in the north east of Renfrewshire. It lies to the south of the River Clyde and close to where the River Gryffe meets the River Cart. The village borders a number of nearby settlements, some separated by a rural hinterland.

== Gallery ==
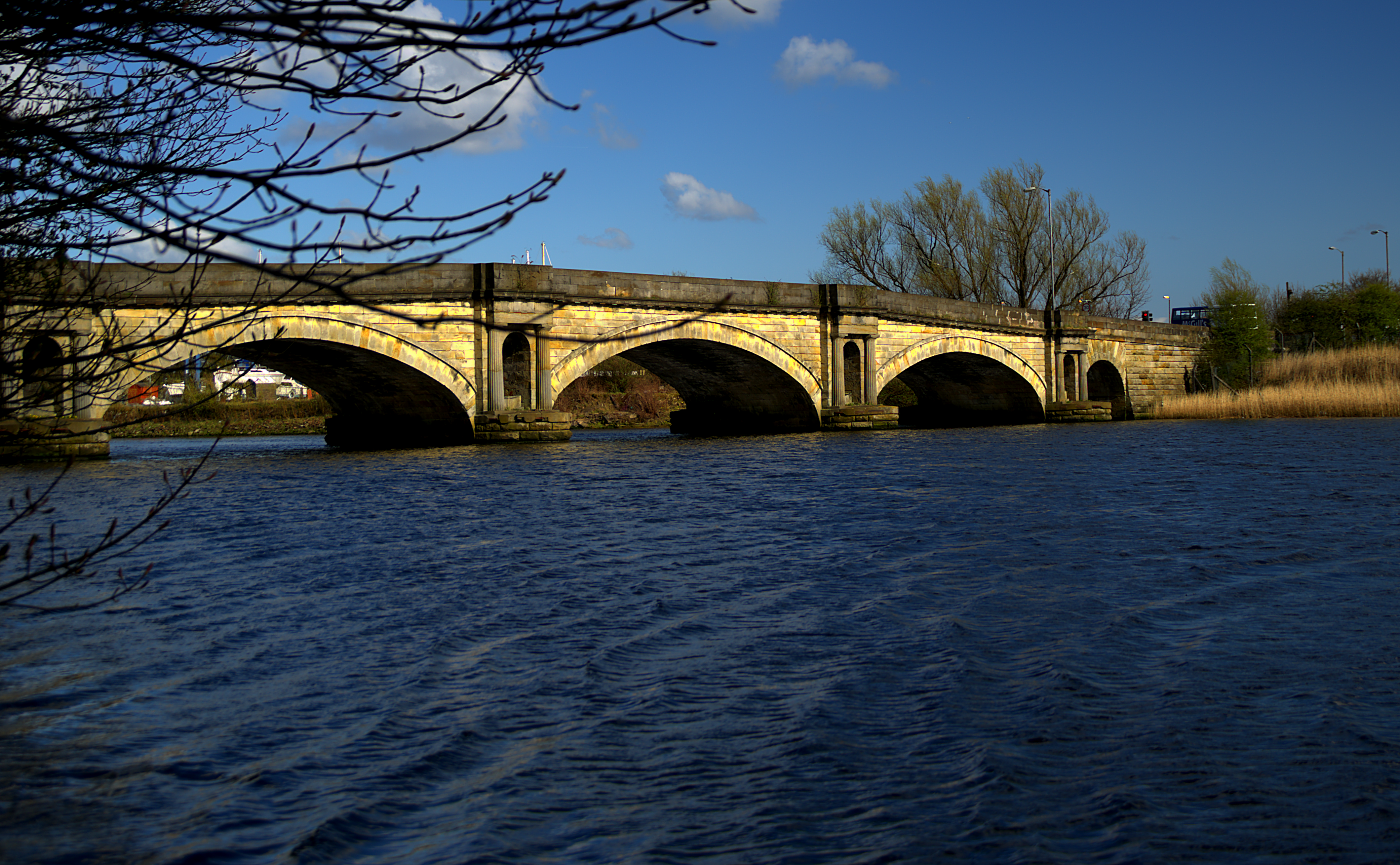
Black Cart Bridge

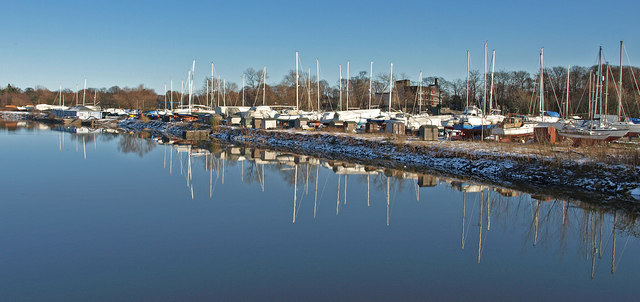
Inchinnan Cruising Club

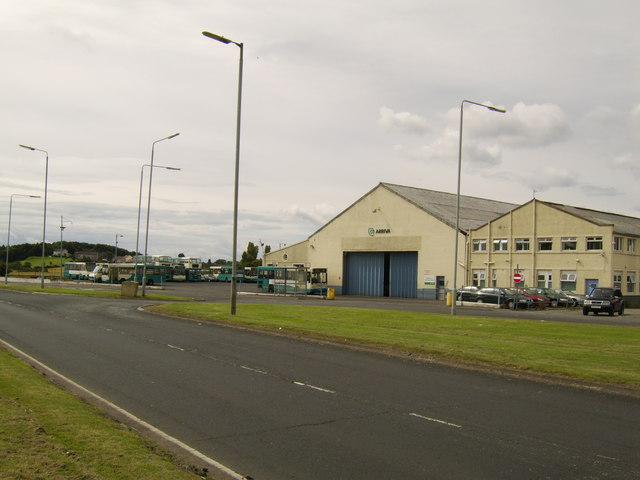
Bus Depot

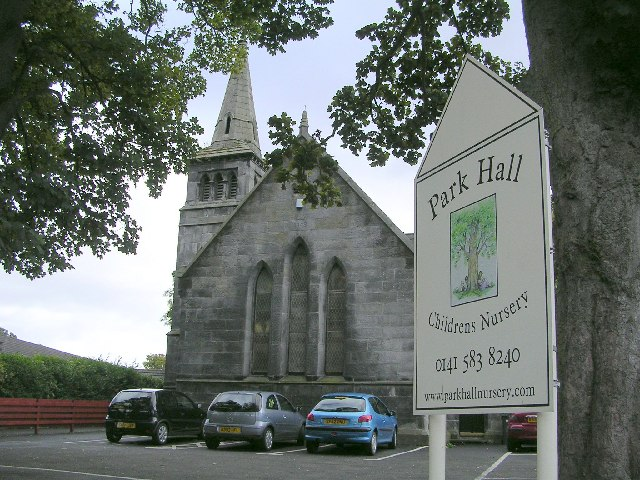
Park Hall Nursery

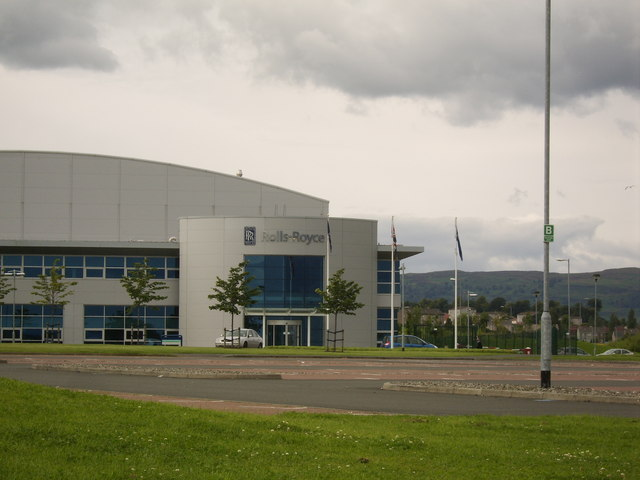
Rolls-Royce Factory

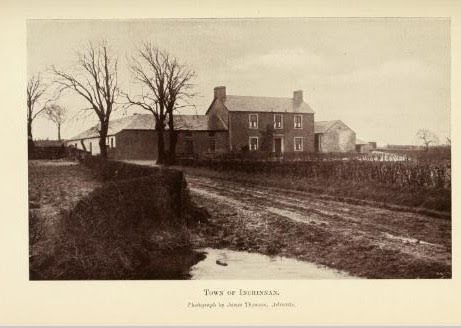
Town of Inchinnan Farm
