= Firestone Tyre Factory =

Former factory in Brentford, England

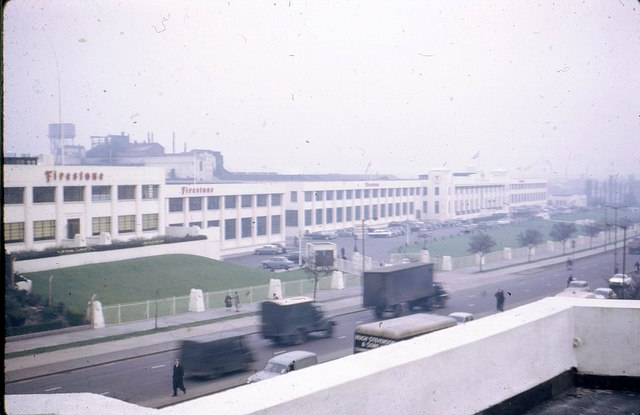
- 1963 view of the factory

- Location within Greater London

General information
- Location: Brentford, United Kingdom
- Coordinates: 51°29′5.9″N 0°19′18.7″W
- Destroyed: August 1980

Design and construction
- Architecture firm: Wallis, Gilbert and Partners

The Firestone Tyre Factory was an Art Deco building on the Great West Road in Brentford in the London Borough of Hounslow. It was designed by Wallis, Gilbert and Partners for the Firestone Tire and Rubber Company. Built on a 26–acre site, it opened in October 1928 and was the second factory to open on the Great West Road, following Hudson-Essex Motors of Great Britain Limited which opened in 1927.

== Demolition and controversy ==
The company announced in November 1979 that it would close the factory.

After its purchase by Trafalgar House, the building was demolished during the August 1980 bank holiday weekend, reportedly in anticipation of its becoming listed. The Twentieth Century Society call the structure their "first serious case" and say that its destruction "focused public attention on the necessity for greater protection for 20th century buildings and led directly to the listing of 150 examples of inter–war architecture (including Battersea Power Station) by the government." The gates, piers and railings fencing the site received a Grade II listing in 2001.

== See also ==
- India Tyre Factory
- Fort Dunlop
- Michelin House
- Hoover Building
- Firestone Building (disambiguation)
