= Boon Farm =

Coordinates: 55.701123°N 2.683558°W

- Boon Farmhouse in 1924

- Location within the Scottish Borders
- OS grid reference: NT574465
- Council area: Scottish Borders
- Lieutenancy area: Berwickshire
- Country: Scotland
- Sovereign state: United Kingdom
- Postcode district: TD2
- Police: Scotland
- Fire: Scottish
- Ambulance: Scottish
- UK Parliament: Berwickshire, Roxburgh and Selkirk
- Scottish Parliament: Midlothian South, Tweeddale and Lauderdale

Boon is a farm and former barony located near Lauder, Scotland.

== History ==
=== Name origins ===
Boon (aka "Boune" or "Bounn"), derives from the Breton word bonn, meaning "boundary", or "limit".

=== Prior to the 17th century ===
Boon Farm, a part of the former Legerwood parish, was carved out of lands that were originally covered in thick woodlands. The Picts, Romans, Anglo-Saxons, Britons, and Scots, successive possessors of this region, consumed the greater part of these woods through the ravages of war, in opening passages through the country, for domestic uses, and in clearing the ground for cultivation.

The remains of an ancient wall, or earthen mound with a ditch on one side, known as The Black Dyke or Heriot's Dyke, runs eastward from Boon towards Greenlaw and the coast at Berwick. It is not known by whom or at what time this wall was built nor for what purpose it was intended.

Up until the 12th century, the lands of Birkenside, Whitslaid, Legerwood, and the Morristons (near Earlston) were public lands. David I held these lands as his demesne, and in 1160 his grandson Malcolm IV granted the lands of Birkenside and Legerwood to Walter fitz Alan. The lands remained in the possession of the Stewart family until Robert II granted the lands of Birkenside, Legerwood, and Morriston to Alan de Lawedre (father of Robert de Lawedre of Edrington) on 13 June 1371.

=== 17th century and 18th centuries ===
By the mid 17th century, the woodland had been almost completely cleared, except for a small remnant called Bounwoode which lay tucked up against the Boondreigh Water, a small burn that runs along the northern boundary of Legerwood before joining the Leader river to the west.

After the widespread destruction of the native woods, the higher, hilly sections were overtaken by heath, and the lower and flat tracts became water-filled bogs and marshes. Small farm-steads with narrow fields were the norm for most of the 17th and early 18th centuries.

The family of Lauder were still in possession of the lands until 1666 when they passed to the Maitlands. Boon was given as a dowry to Lady Mary Maitland, the daughter of John Maitland, 1st Duke of Lauderdale, when she married John Hay, 2nd Marquess of Tweeddale.

Boon Farm was continuously farmed by the Mirtle family from the late 1600s until 1810.

=== 19th century ===
On 31 January 1810 John Mirtle of Boon Farm, uncle of William Mirtle, died at the advanced age of 95, leaving no heirs. The farm passed through unknown hands until 1872, where Dr. Robert Shirra Gibb took over the lease and worked the lands for 50 years, until retiring in 1922.

=== Boon Hill ===
At 1070 feet above sea level, Boon Hill is a prominent eminence rising above the fields of Boon Farm and the surrounding countryside. During the reign of Queen Anne, there was a small fort on top of the hill which housed a sergeant and two soldiers, stationed there to man the beacon hut. Portions of the fort remained standing until 1840, when they were blown down during a windstorm. The landowner, the Marquess of Tweeddale, ordered a small tower to be built upon the hill to commemorate the site of the old fort.

=== Dod's Corse Stone ===
Located near the base of Boon Hill, Dod's Corse Stone is an ancient shaft of sandstone sticking out of a block of the same material, inscribed with a cross on opposite sides. It was placed at the site of an old marketplace, according to local tradition.

The stone commemorates a duel between Johnne Cranstoun, brother of Patrick Cranstoun of Corsbie, and Alexander Frenche on 13 March 1612. Frenche and his accomplice, James Wicht, were tried and sentenced to beheading.

== Boon Farm today ==
Boon Farm was the site of a proposed wind farm, which would have seen up to 21 wind turbines placed on Corsbie Moor. The proposal was ultimately rejected.

== Gallery ==
Bounwoode and Bounn Mill in 1654, as shown on the Blaeu Atlas of Scotland

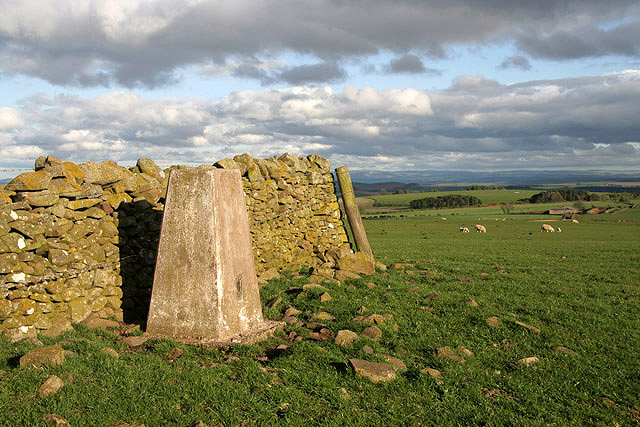
Boon hill, showing remains of a wall and a triangulation station

Map of Boon Farm, including notable landmarks, 1924

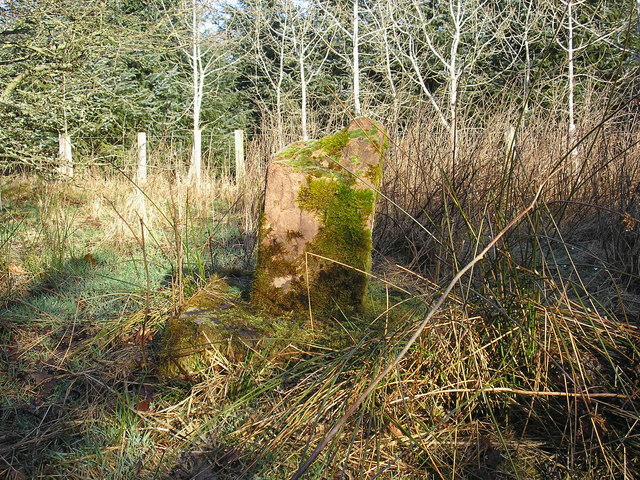
Dod's Corse Stone
