= Walter Steward =

Walter Steward, Walter the Steward or Walter Stewart may refer to:

- Walter the Steward, 1st High Steward of Scotland (died 1177)
- Walter Stewart, 6th High Steward of Scotland (died 1326)
