= Renfrew Castle =

Castle in Renfrewshire, Scotland

- Renfrew, Renfrewshire, Scotland

Site information
- Condition: Demolished

Location
- Location within Renfrewshire
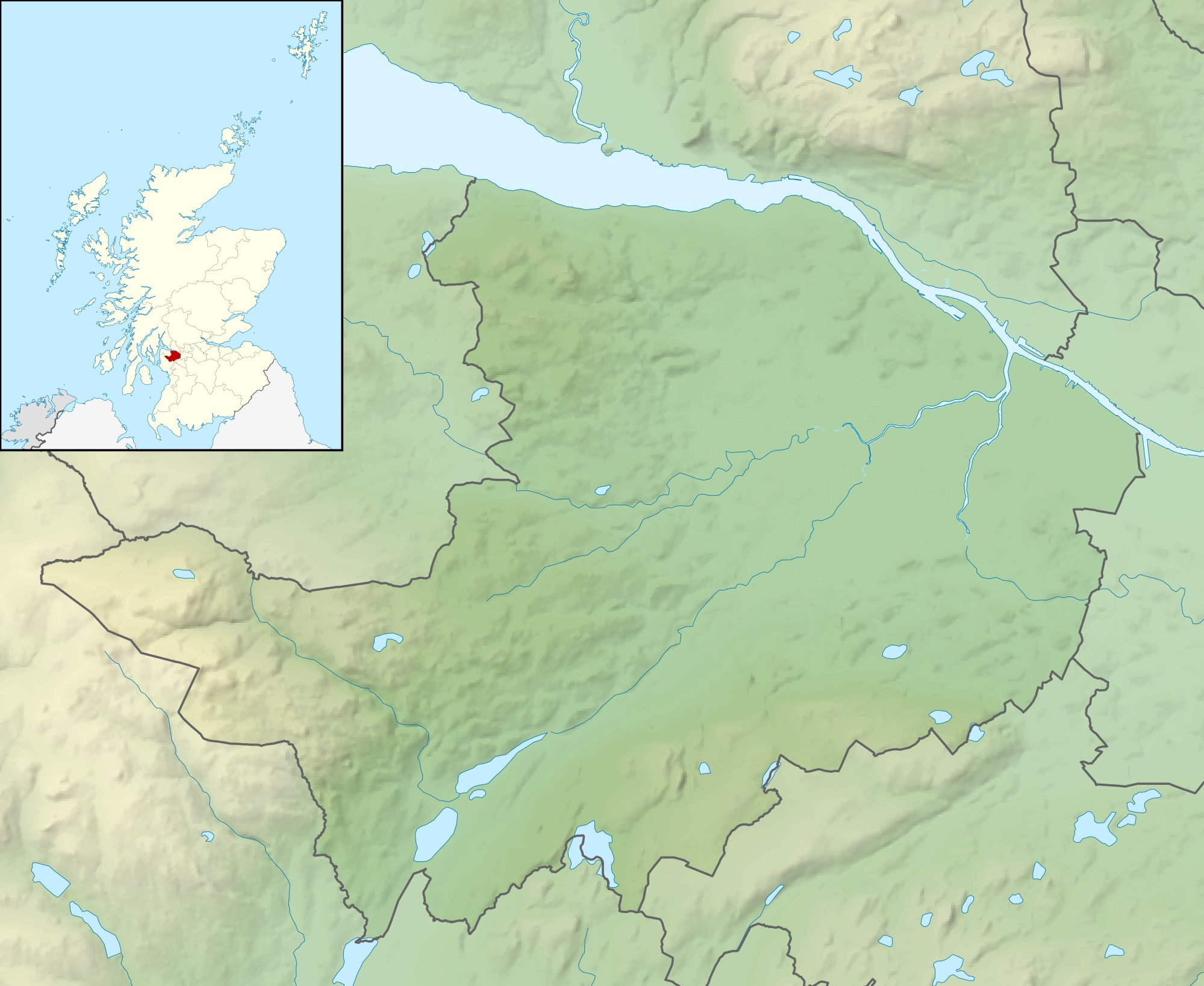
- Location within Renfrewshire
- Coordinates: 55.880°N 4.386°W
- Grid reference: grid reference NS 5086 6787

Site history
- Built: 12th century
- Built by: Walter fitz Alan
- In use: Until 16th or 17th century

Renfrew Castle was situated at the royal burgh of Renfrew, Scotland, which is near the confluence of the River Clyde and the River Cart. The original 12th-century castle was built by Walter fitz Alan, upon a river islet known as the King's Inch. This was replaced in the 13th century with a new castle by the road to the Clyde ferry, which became a royal castle under King Robert II. In the 15th century, the King's Inch site was rebuilt as Inch Castle by Sir John Ross. Both castles were demolished in the 18th century and nothing remains above ground at either site.

== History ==
=== 12th-century castle ===
The King's Inch was formerly an island in the River Clyde, and was among the lands granted to Walter fitz Alan by King David I in the mid-12th century, when Walter was also made first hereditary Steward of Scotland. The castle was constructed from wood with stone foundations, and may have been a motte. The strategic location of this castle was designed to prevent the eastward expansion of Somerled's lordship in Argyll and the Isles.

=== Renfrew Castle ===
In the 13th century the Stewart family, descendants of Walter fitz Alan, constructed a new residence at the north end of the old High Street of Renfrew. This castle has been attributed to James, 5th High Steward (died 1309).

It was captured by the English during the Wars of Scottish Independence, and King Edward I of England granted Renfrew to Henry de Lacy, Earl of Lincoln, in 1301. In 1310 King Edward II of England ordered that the castle and burgh be sacked after he spent one night at the castle. Renfrew was then given in a charter by Edward Balliol to David de Strathbogie, Earl of Atholl, in 1332. The Stewarts with the help of Sir Colin Campbell of Lochow later recaptured Renfrew Castle.

Robert, 7th High Steward, is traditionally said to have been born at Renfrew Castle. On his accession as King Robert II in 1371, the castle became a royal residence. The castle was visited by monarchs including James IV, who stayed there when visiting Paisley Abbey.

In the 18th century, the castle was dismantled and the stone used to build soap works. This was replaced by Castlehill House, which was itself demolished, and the ground now forms a playground surrounded by modern buildings. The name Castlehill Gardens and a low mound can still be seen, though excavations in 1997 discovered no evidence of the castle other than pottery sherds dated to the 12th-14th centuries.

=== Inch Castle ===
In the later 15th century the King's Inch was granted to Sir John Ross, who built a new castle over the ruins of Walter's motte. Known as Inch Castle, this building was occupied by the Ross family until 1732, and in 1760 was sold to Andrew Spiers of Elderslie. Spiers demolished the castle and constructed Elderslie House in 1777, which was in turn demolished in 1924. The rebuilt castle had four stories and was topped by crow-stepped gables. There was a central stair-tower, corbelled out above the first floor.

The King's Inch is no longer an island, being on the south bank of the Clyde, and Braehead Power Station was built over the area in the 20th century. This too has since been demolished and the exact location of Inch Castle is now uncertain, though it lies somewhere in the Braehead development area. Investigations in 2005 identified the foundations of Elderslie House at grid reference NS 5140 6762, as well as features on the same site that could represent the 15th-century castle.
