= Robertson Park =

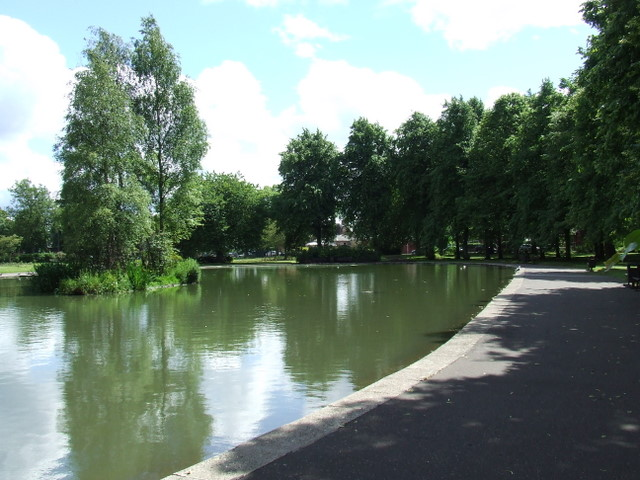
- Pond at the park
- Interactive map of Robertson Park
- Location: Renfrew
- Nearest city: Glasgow
- Coordinates: 55.876°N 4.394°W
- Operator: Renfrewshire Council
- Open: October 1912
- Status: Open

Robertson Park is in Renfrew, Scotland. It has recreational parkland and garden areas which are open to the public.

== History ==
The land the park is on was gifted to the Royal Burgh of Renfrew in early 1912 by a wealthy local family, the Robertsons. They donated the land to create an open space for the children and families of Renfrew. The park was named after the original land owners and opened in October 1912. Renfrewshire Council are responsible for the park.

A commemorative oak tree was erected in October 2012. It was planted to celebrate the park being 100 years old. Renfrewshire's Deputy Provost John Caldwell and a group of local school children were present at the ceremony. Renfrew Community Museum loaned out a spade that the Robertson family used to plant the first tree at the park in 1912 for the occasion.

== Amenities ==
The park offers various amenities and activities for the general public. These include a duck pond, floral gardens, BMX course, skateboard park, tennis courts, putting area, bowling green, sensory garden, cycle tracks, swing parks and a small animal enclosure.

== Gallery ==
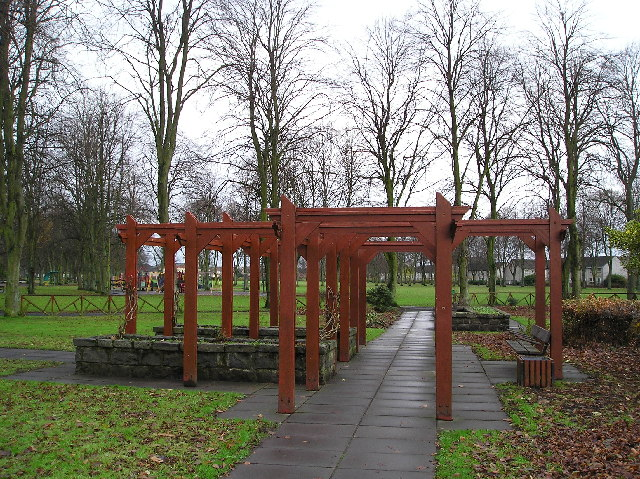
Sensory garden

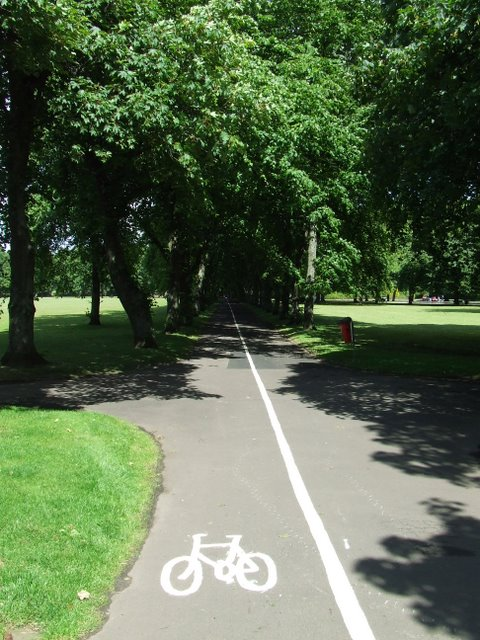
Cycle tracks at the park
