= Renfrew =

Town in Renfrewshire, Scotland

Coordinates: 55.878°N 4.389°W

Renfrew: Scottish Gaelic: Rinn Friù; Scots: Renfrew
- Town
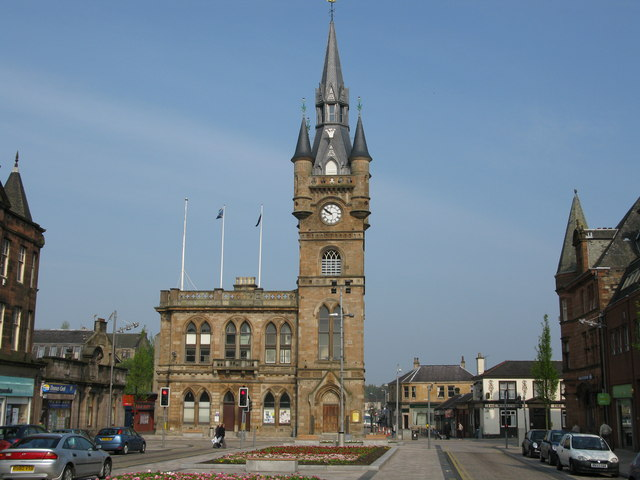
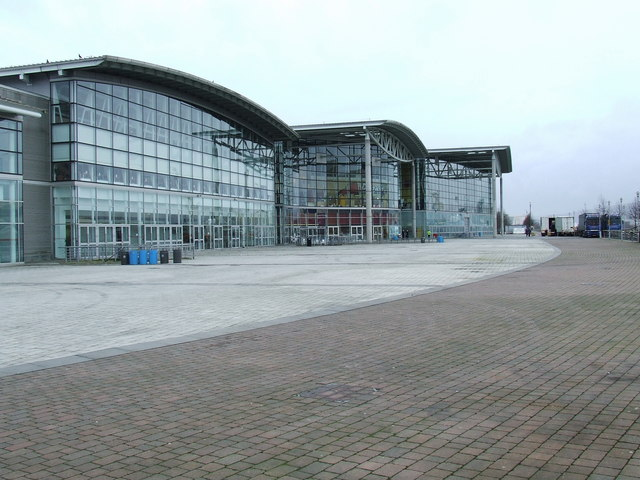
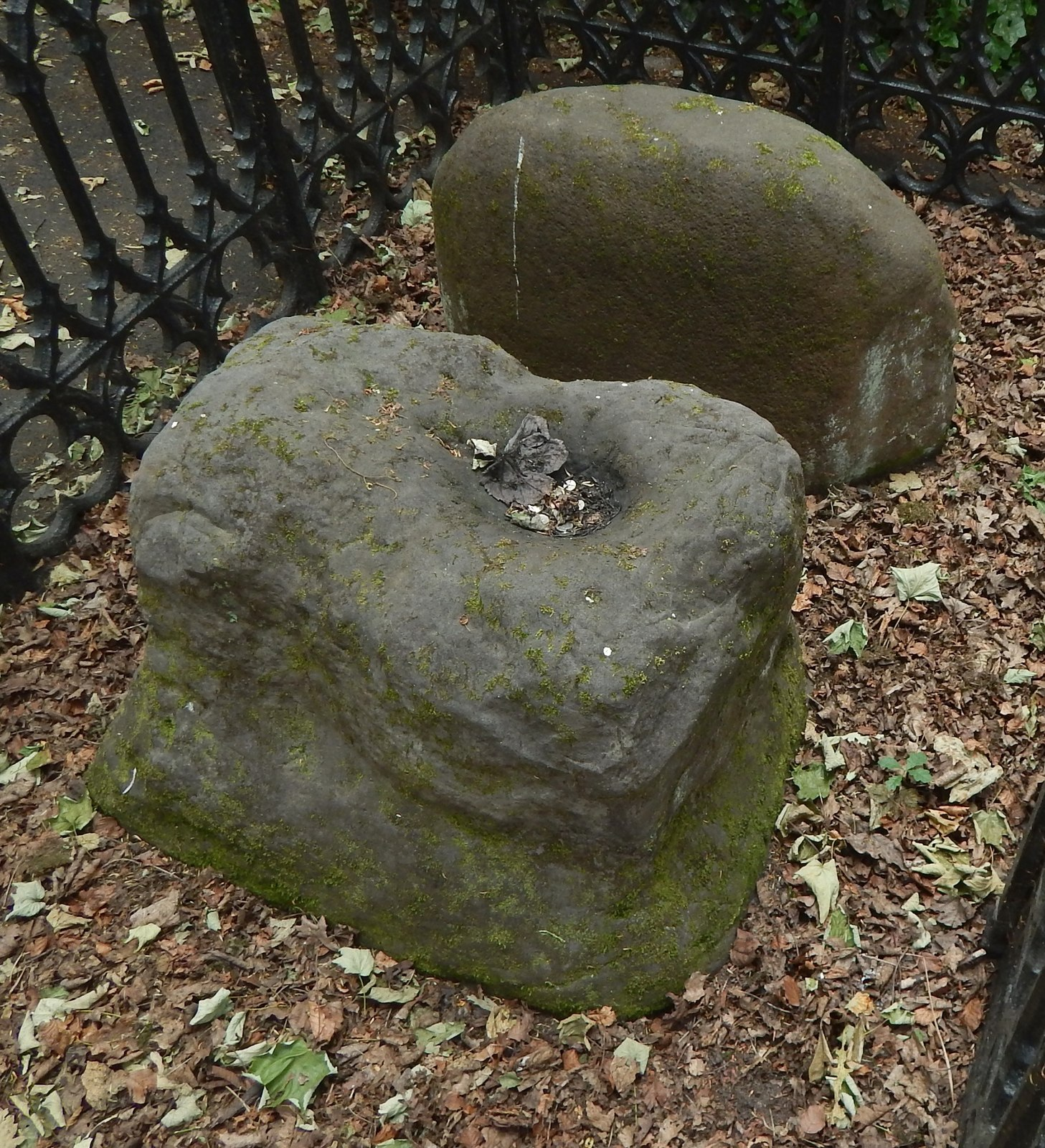
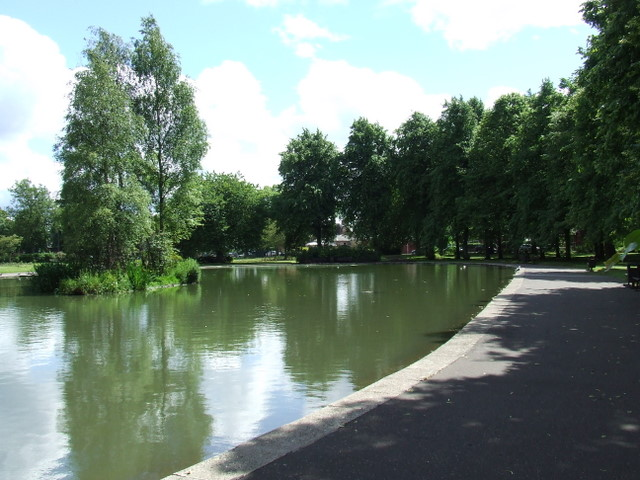
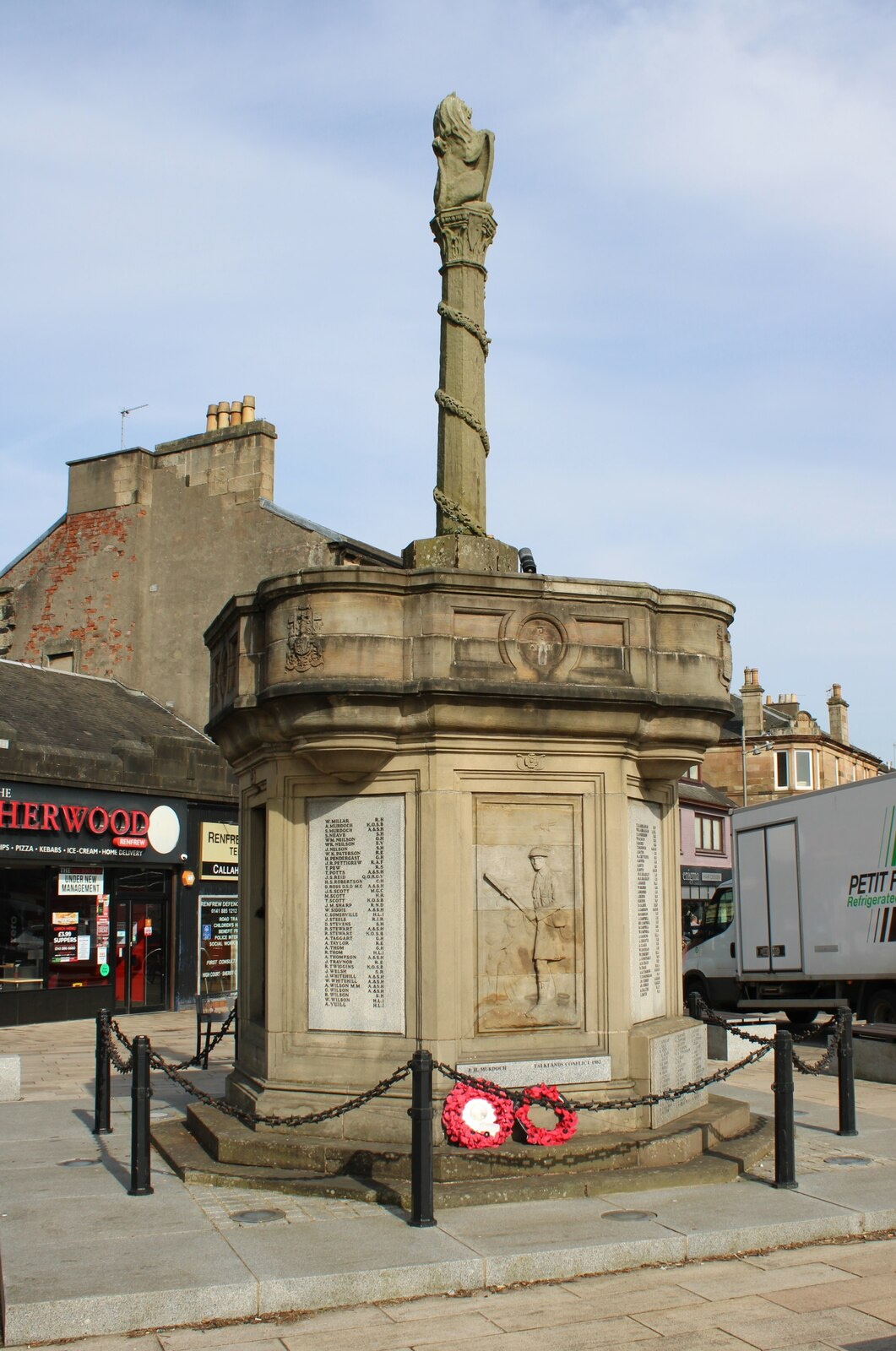
- Top: Renfrew Town Hall, Middle: Braehead Arena, Argyll Stone, Bottom: Robertson Park, War Memorial

- Coat of arms Burgh flag of Renfrew

- Location within Renfrewshire Renfrew (Renfrewshire)
- Population: 23,809 (2022)
- OS grid reference: NS519186
- Council area: Renfrewshire
- Lieutenancy area: Renfrewshire
- Country: Scotland
- Sovereign state: United Kingdom
- Post town: Renfrew
- Postcode district: PA4
- Dialling code: 0141
- Police: Scotland
- Fire: Scottish
- Ambulance: Scottish
- UK Parliament: Paisley and Renfrewshire North
- Scottish Parliament: Renfrewshire North and West

Renfrew (/ˈrɛnfruː/ REN-froo; Scots: Renfrew; Scottish Gaelic: Rinn Friù) is a town and royal burgh in Renfrewshire, Scotland. It is located 6 miles (10 km) west of Glasgow in the west central Lowlands of Scotland, and is the historic county town of Renfrewshire. The town had a population of 23,809 in 2022.

Called the "Cradle of the Royal Stewarts" for its early link with Scotland's former royal house, Renfrew gained royal burgh status in 1397.

As the county town, Renfrew once was a centre of local government for the surrounding area. Whilst the county remained known as "Renfrewshire", the focus of local government gradually shifted from Renfrew to its larger neighbour Paisley.

Following the reorganisation of 1996, Renfrewshire was divided for local government purposes into three modern council areas: Renfrewshire, with considerably smaller boundaries than the old county, including Renfrew and with its administrative centre at Paisley; Inverclyde with its centre at Greenock, covering the western part of the county; and East Renfrewshire, with its centre at Giffnock. The boundaries of the historic County of Renfrew remain for a number of ceremonial and administrative purposes.

The House of Stewart was previously based at the former Renfrew Castle. In 1164, it was the site of the Battle of Renfrew, a decisive victory for the Scottish crown over Somerled, Lord of the Isles. Given its link to the monarchy and the victory at Renfrew, the heir to the British throne holds the title of Baron Renfrew and Lord of the Isles, the current holder being Prince William, Duke of Rothesay.

Renfrew's historic industries include shipbuilding, given its position on the River Clyde and River Cart, and engineering. Today it primarily contains service sector businesses, including the nearby Braehead retail and leisure centre, built in 1999, which has resulted in the expansion of the town along Renfrew's riverside.

== History ==
The name Renfrew comes from the Cumbric cognate of the Welsh expression rhyn frwd 'point at the current'; the River Cart enters the Clyde by the town. Renfrew's recorded history began with the granting of land in the area to Walter fitz Alan, the High Steward of Scotland by King David I in the 12th century. The strategic location of this castle was to prevent the eastern expansion of the lordship belonging to Somerled, the Lord of the Isles, and to protect western Scotland from Norse invaders.

Renfrew Castle was situated in what is now part of the well-known Braehead shopping complex. It was located on the King's inch or King's Island.

Later in the 12th century, King Malcolm IV, grandson of David, finally demanded Somerled's fealty. In 1164, Somerled sailed to Renfrew and attacked an assembling Scottish army in a conflict known as the Battle of Renfrew. The outcome was a defeat of the Lordship of the Isles and the death of Somerled. The Lords of the Isles were eventually stripped of their lands and titles in 1493, as a consequence of conspiring with an earlier King of England (Edward IV) to overthrow the Scottish monarchy. Since that time, "Lord of the Isles" – like "Baron of Renfrew" - has been a courtesy title of the heir to the throne and both are currently held by William, Duke of Rothesay.

The role of the Stewarts continued to grow and in 1315 Walter Stewart, 6th High Steward married Marjorie, daughter of King Robert the Bruce. Their son succeeded to the throne as Robert II of Scotland.

During the Monmouth Rebellion of 1685, Archibald Campbell, 9th Earl of Argyll was injured and captured at Renfrew before being transported to Edinburgh and executed for his role in attempting to overthrow the Crown. The Argyle Stones in the town mark the site where his capture took place.

During the night of 13 March 1941, three Polish airmen saved Renfrew's Roman Catholic church of Saint James. Lance Corporal Pawel Radke, Aircraftman Antoni Ptaszkowski, and Aircraftman Zygmunt Sokolowski were at the church and at great risk were extinguishing incendiaries. These had caused a number of fires in the church. Two of the airmen were killed by a bomb and the third died in Alexandria Hospital the following day. They were in their twenties. When 309 Squadron transferred to Dunino in Fife in May 1941, it presented to the church a portrait of Our Lady as a token of their appreciation to the people of Renfrew. Parishioners never forgot the sacrifice and in October 1982 at a special Mass, a silver plaque in memory of the airmen and the portrait of the Black Madonna was blessed and dedicated by Bishop McGill. The plaque was crafted by a local Polish jeweler, Eugeniusz Waclawski.

At the General Assembly of the Church of Scotland in 2013, the Rev Lorna Hood, minister at Renfrew North Parish Church and a Chaplain to The Queen, became Moderator of the Assembly for the subsequent annual term. Renfrew Old Parish Church, in the town centre, closed as a place of worship in 2013, due to building maintenance costs.

Renfrew also has two Masonic Lodges: Prince of Wales and Lodge Moorpark, numbers 426 and 1263 respectively, of the Roll of the Grand Lodge of Scotland.

== Demography ==
At the 2022 Scottish census, Renfrew had a population of 23,809 inhabitants.

== Governance ==
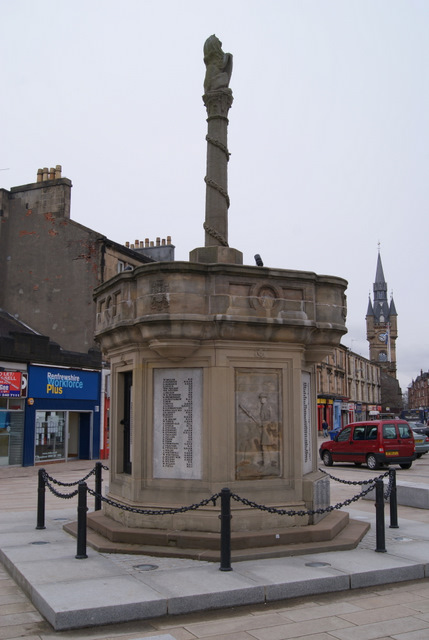
Renfrew's mercat cross and war memorial.

=== Local government and royal burgh ===
The coat of arms of Renfrew

Although the town gives its name to the council area of Renfrewshire and the larger county of the same name which was used for local government before 1975, the administrative functions of both have in modern times been operated from the considerably larger neighbouring town of Paisley.

The early origins of Renfrewshire lie in the expanding influence of the Stewarts of Renfrew, the family holding the hereditary High Stewardship of Scotland. In 1371, Robert Stewart was crowned King of Scotland as Robert II, and in 1402 his son Robert III established the shire of Renfrew, crafted from territory previously within the shire of Lanark and based in Renfrew, the site of the Stewarts' castle.

Renfrewshire's Commissioners of Supply, Quarter Sessions and freeholders met at Renfrew, as did the sheriff court until it was moved to Paisley in 1705. This began a gradual move in the focus of local government to Paisley. During this time, Renfrew continued to hold status not only as a royal burgh, but as a parliamentary, municipal and police burgh.

Renfrew is now represented by its own community council, which meets in Renfrew Town Hall.

=== Parliament of the United Kingdom ===
Renfrew was a parliamentary burgh as a component of Glasgow Burghs from 1708 to 1832, and as a component of Kilmarnock Burghs from 1832 to 1918, when it was merged into the East Renfrewshire constituency. Since 2005, it has been part of the Paisley and Renfrewshire North constituency. Gavin Newlands, SNP MP currently holds the seat for the constituency (2015–).

In the Scottish Parliament, Renfrew is part of the Renfrewshire North & West Constituency. Scottish Government Finance Secretary Derek Mackay has held the seat for the SNP since 2011.

== Transport ==
=== Road network ===
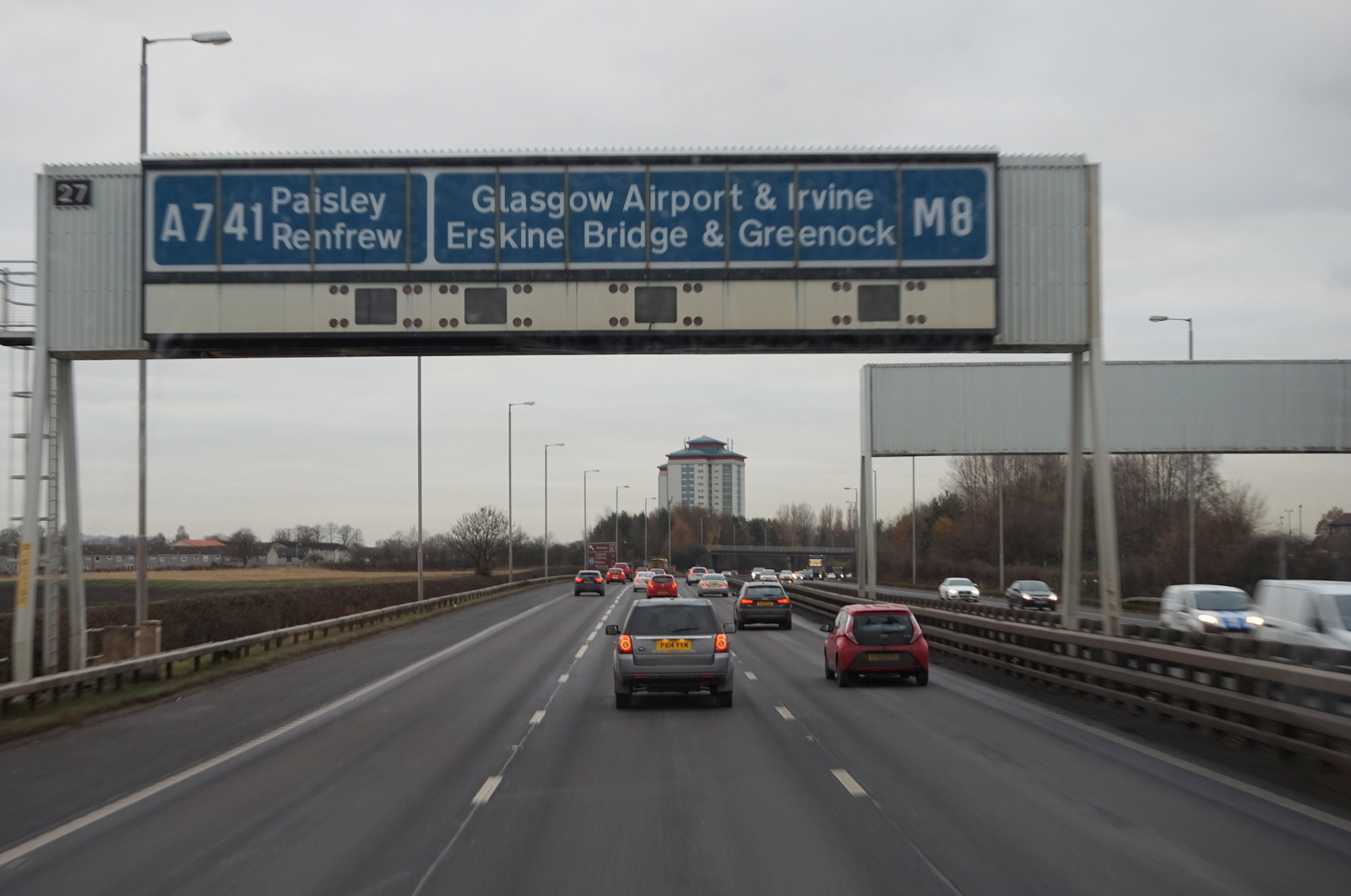
M8 motorway westbound

The M8 motorway intersects Renfrew and two junctions at Arkleston and Braehead provide access to the town, with the neighbouring town of Paisley largely lying on the opposite side. The former Renfrew Airport was located to the south of the town (only a couple of miles from the present Glasgow Airport). The site of the terminal building is now occupied by a Tesco supermarket.

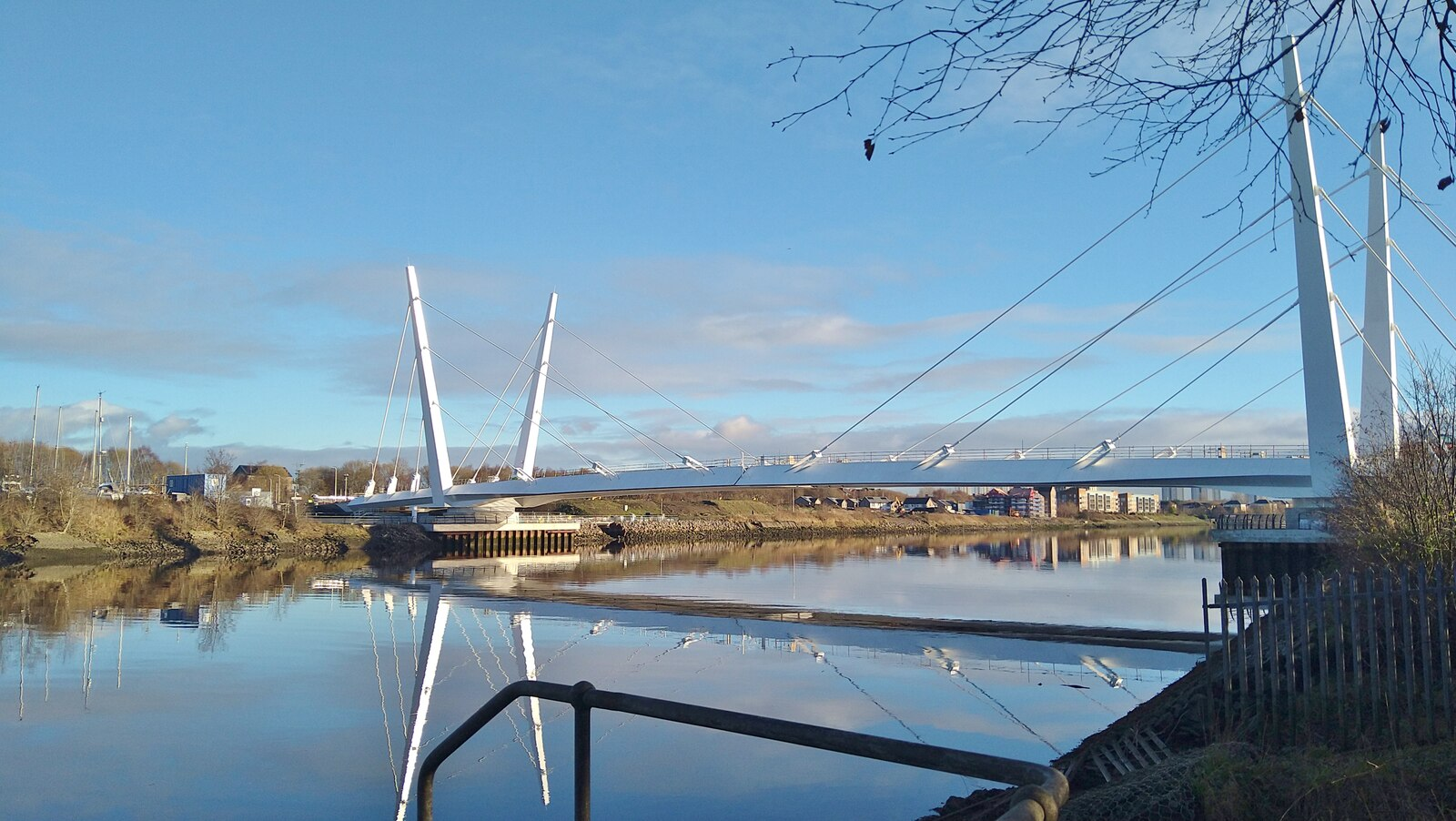
Renfrew Bridge

In the early 21st century, as part of the wider 'Clyde Waterfront and Renfrew Riverside Project' involving regeneration and new residential developments, a new moveable bridge known as The Renfrew Bridge was proposed to connect Renfrew/Braehead to Yoker/Clydebank for vehicular traffic, using 'City Deal' funding. The bridge project stalled at the planning stage in late 2018, but construction was underway by early 2024, with the bridge opening on 9 May 2025.

=== Buses ===
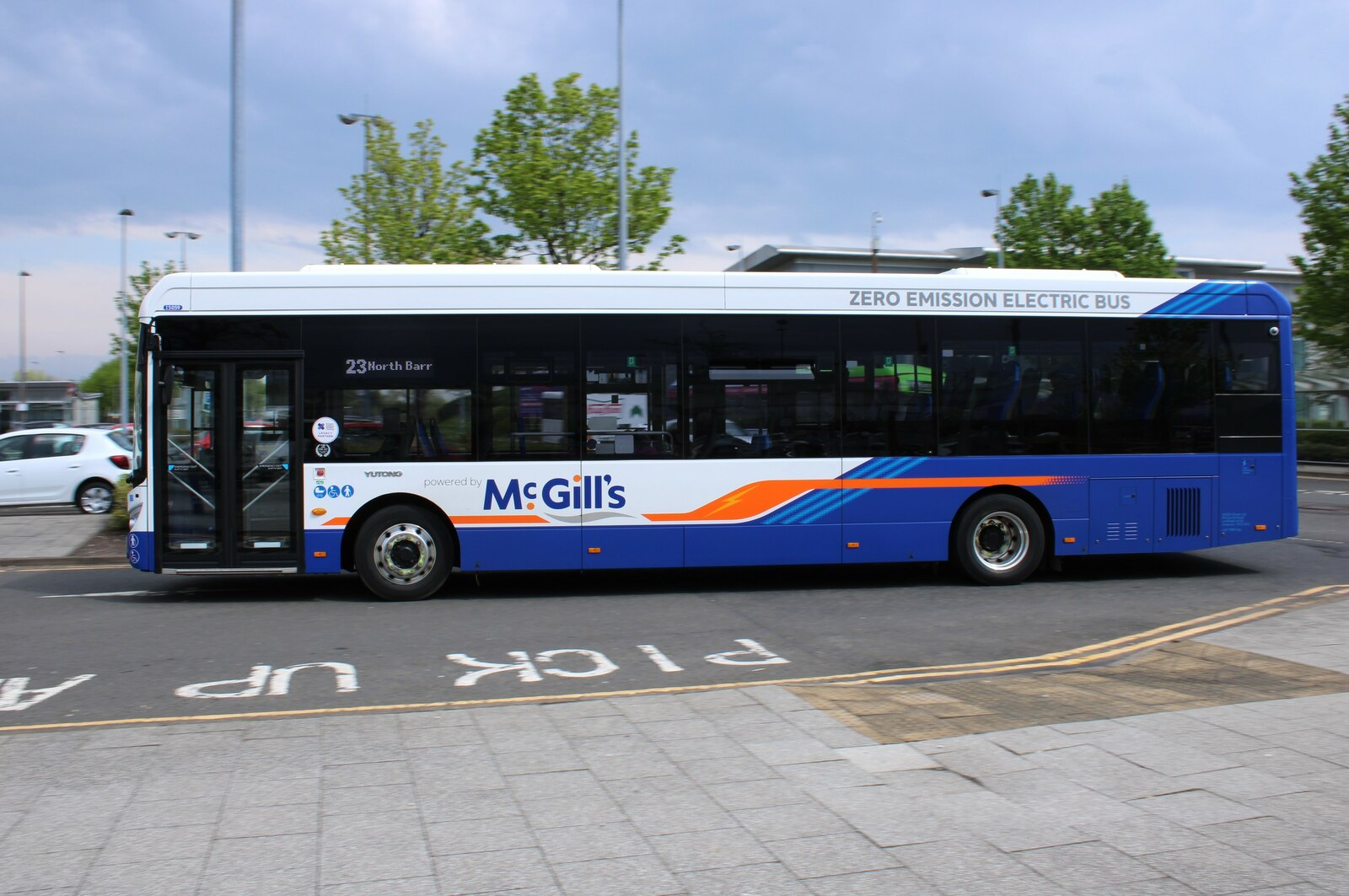
McGill's Buses service 23 bound for North Barr in Erskine

Renfrew is served by McGills buses and First Bus with services operating to Braehead Shopping Centre, Glasgow city centre as well as various routes that pass through Renfrew connecting to Erskine, Paisley, Glasgow Airport, and Govan.

=== Rail ===
Renfrew was also once served by a series of stations on a branch of the Glasgow and Paisley Joint Railway. However it was closed to passengers in 1967. The nearest present-day station is Hillington West.

There are also Plans to connect Renfrew to Glasgow with a heavy metro line as part of the proposed Clyde Metro Project.

=== The Renfrew ferry ===
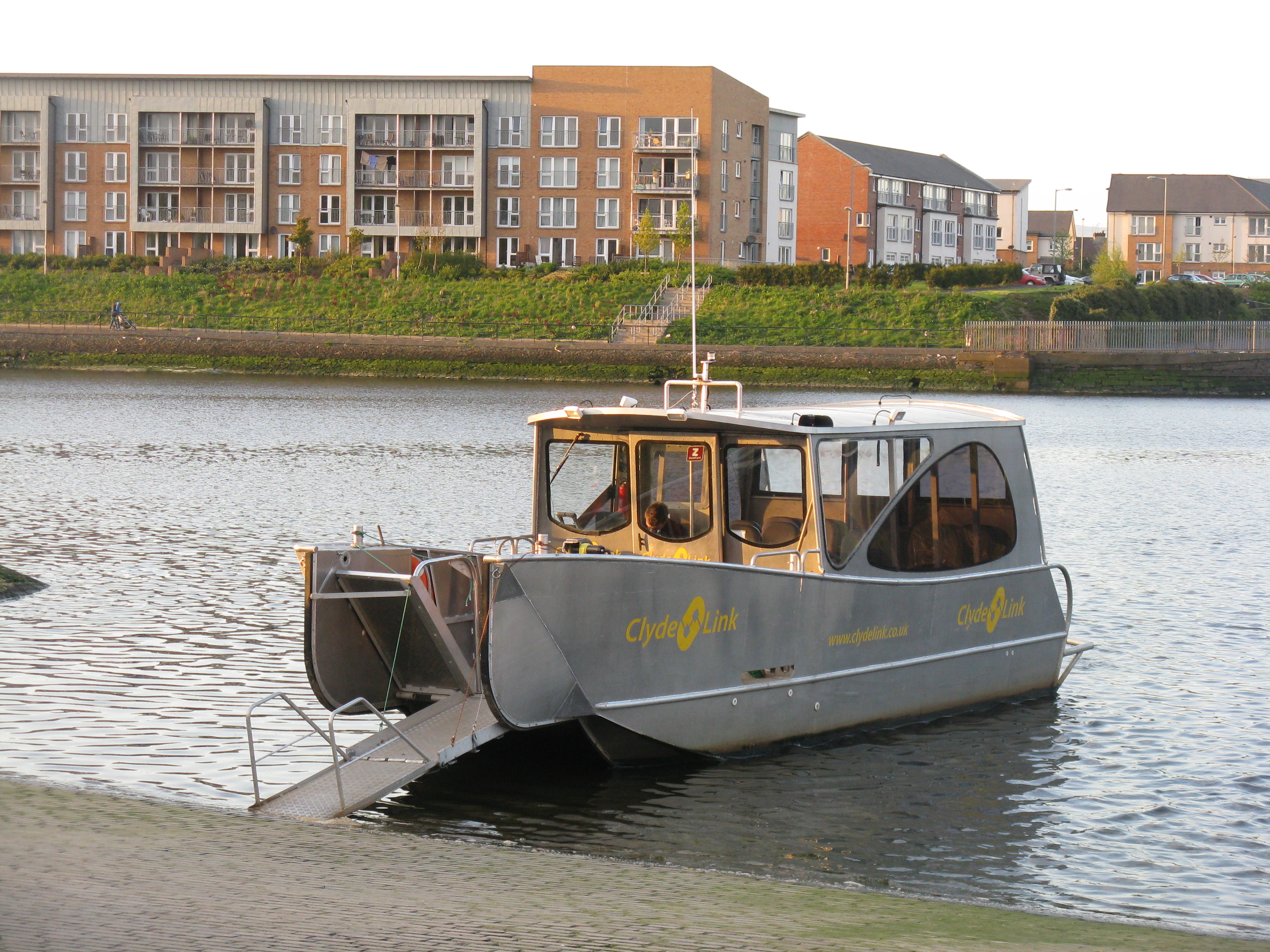
Renfrew Ferry

The Renfrew ferry, was a ferry service linking Renfrew and Yoker together with the crossing only taking a few minutes. The service was replaced by the Renfrew Bridge shortly after opening.

The service initially continued operating after the bridge opened on 9 May 2025. However later on 31 May 2025 the ferry permanently ceased operations citing the bridge opening resulting in reduced passenger numbers to the point where the service was unsuitable to operate.

== Football ==
Renfrew Football Club plays at New Western Park in the West of Scotland Football League Premier Division.

== Notable people ==
Notable people from Renfrew include:

- Fred Colledge, cricketer
- Lorne Crerar, lawyer
- Winifred Drinkwater, aviator
- Bob Harley, footballer
- Alex Hunter, footballer
- Jackie Husband, footballer
- Derek Mackay, former SNP politician
- James McDonald, WW1 flying ace
- Neil Oliver, television presenter, archaeologist, historian and author
- Mitchell Lawrie, darts player

== Economy ==
The major industry of Renfrew was previously shipbuilding. Simons and Lobnitz, most notable for building sand dredgers were based in the town. The Renfrew shipyard closed in the early 1960s.

Further expansion of Renfrew's economy took place in 1938 with the opening of Hillington industrial estate, now named Hillington Park, not to be confused with the neighbouring Hillington housing estate which falls within the city of Glasgow's boundaries.

Renfrew is home to the engineering company Doosan Babcock (formerly Babcock & Wilcox), the King George V Dock and the Braehead out-of-town retail development.

== Geography ==
Renfrew is at the confluence of the River Clyde and the River Cart. A passenger ferry previously crossed the Clyde to Yoker, now the Renfrew Bridge spans the Clyde to Clydebank and Yoker. A bascule bridge spans the Cart to Inchinnan and Glasgow Airport. King's Inch and Sand Inch islands once lay off the river bank of the Clyde on the southern side until they became joined with the 'mainland' and they are now part of Renfrew.

== See also ==
- Doosan Babcock
- Robertson Park
- Braehead
- Normandy Hotel
- Renfrew Ferry
- White Cart Bridge
- Renfrew Golf Club
- Renfrew F.C.
- 2nd Renfrew Trinity Scout Group (51st Renfrewshire)

== General and cited references ==
- Patterson, Raymond Campbell (2008). The Lords of the Isles, A history of Clan Donald. Edinburgh: Birlinn Limited. ISBN 978-1-84158-718-9.
