= Walter fitz Alan =

Anglo-Norman nobleman

Walter FitzAlan
- Steward of Scotland
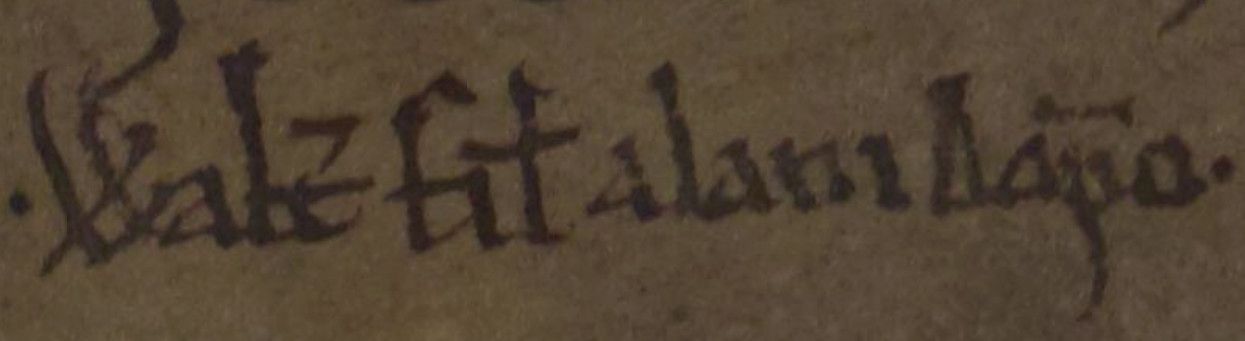
- Walter's name and title as it appears in a royal charter to Holyrood Abbey: "Walter filio alani Dapifero"
- Successor: Alan fitz Walter
- Born: c. 1106/10; Shropshire
- Died: 1177; Melrose Abbey
- Buried: Paisley Priory
- Noble family: Fitz Alan family
- Spouse: Eschina de Londres
- Issue: Alan fitz Walter; Christina?
- Father: Alan fitz Flaad
- Mother: Avelina de Hesdin

Walter FitzAlan (c. 1106/10 – 1177) was a twelfth-century Anglo-Norman baron who became a Scottish magnate and Steward of Scotland. (Note: Since the 1990s, academics have accorded Walter various patronyms in English secondary sources: Walter Fitz Alan, Walter fitz Alan, Walter Fitzalan, Walter fitzAlan, and Walter FitzAlan. Likewise, since the 1990s, academics have accorded Walter various occupational names in English secondary sources: Walter Stewart, Walter the Steward, and Walter the Stewart.) which is where the Stewart (Stuart) house comes from. He was a younger son of Alan fitz Flaad and Avelina de Hesdin. In about 1136, Walter entered into the service of David I, King of Scotland. He became the king's dapifer or steward in about 1150, and served as such for three successive Scottish kings: David, Malcolm IV and William I. In time, the stewardship became hereditarily held by Walter's descendants.

Walter started his career as a minor English baron. Upon arriving in Scotland, however, he received a substantial grant of lands from his Scottish sovereigns. These included the western provincial lordships of: Mearns, Strathgryfe, Renfrew and North Kyle. The caput of Walter's holdings is uncertain, although there is reason to suspect it was either Dundonald Castle or Renfrew Castle. Walter was a benefactor of several religious houses, and was the founder of Paisley Priory.

There is reason to suspect that Walter took part in the Siege of Lisbon against the Moors in 1147. He probably assisted Malcolm in the series of Scottish invasions of Galloway in 1160, which resulted in the downfall of Fergus, Lord of Galloway. Walter and the other colonial lords settled in western Scotland were probably intended to protect the Scottish realm from external threats located in regions such as Galloway and the Isles. In 1164, Somairle mac Gilla Brigte, King of the Isles invaded Scotland and was defeated near Renfrew. It is possible that the commander of the local Scottish forces was Walter himself.

Walter was married to Eschina de Londres, an apparent member of the Londres/London family. There is reason to suspect that she was also matrilineally descended from a family native to southern Scotland. If correct, this could explain why Walter was granted the lands of Mow. Alternately, it is possible that Eschina's rights to Mow merely stemmed from her marriage to Walter. Eschina and Walter were the parents of Alan, Walter's successor. The couple may have also been the parents of a Christina, a woman who married into the Brus and Dunbar families. Walter was an ancestor of the Stewart family, from which descended the royal House of Stuart; he is therefore an ancestor of every Scottish monarch since Robert II and every English or British monarch since James VI and I. He died in 1177.

== Ancestry and arrival in Scotland ==
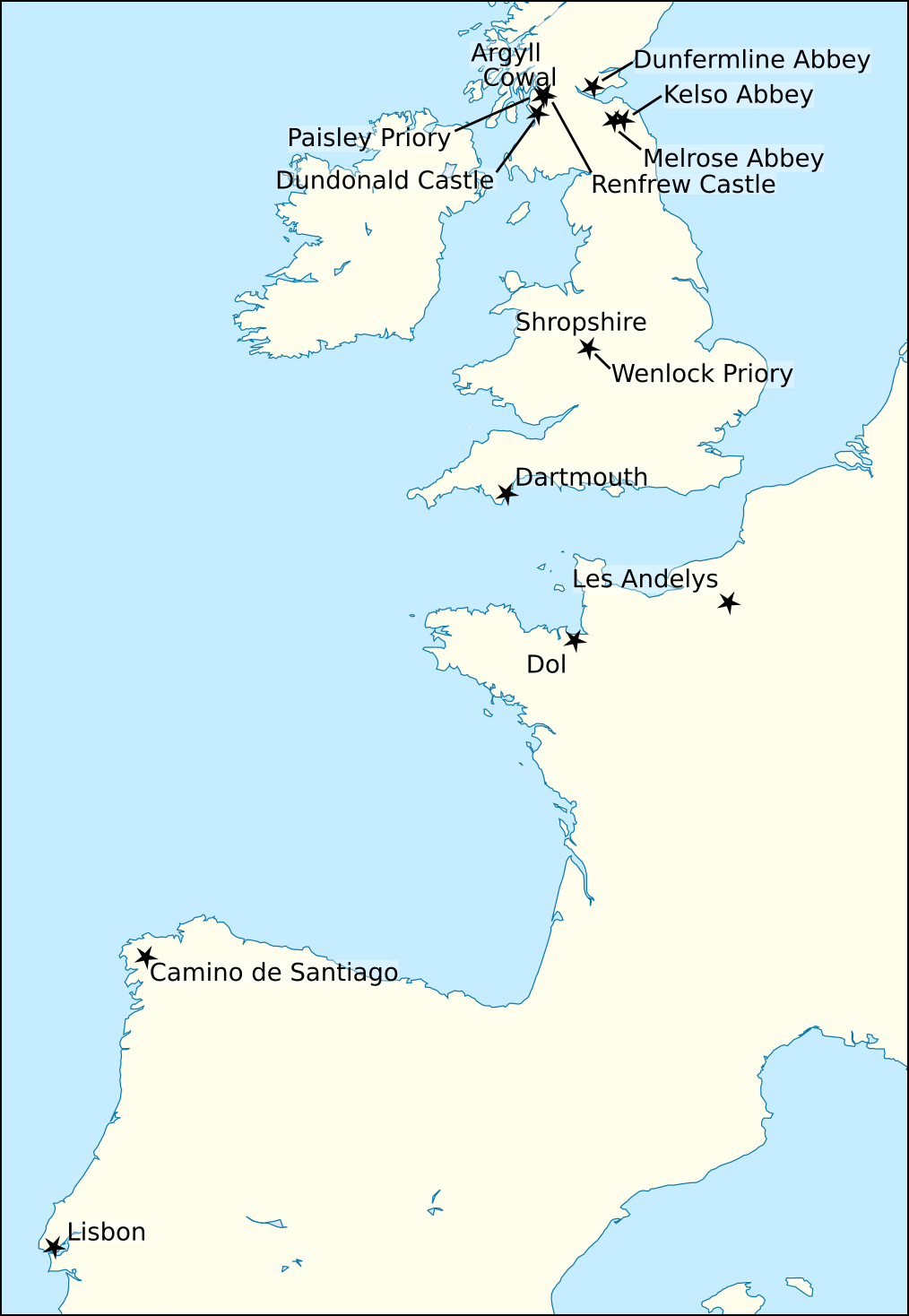
Locations relating to the life and times of Walter

Walter was a member of the Fitz Alan family. He was born in about 1110. Walter was a son of Alan fitz Flaad (died 1121×) and Avelina de Hesdin. (Note: In the fourteenth century, during the reign of Walter's royal descendant Robert II, King of Scotland (died 1390), the Scottish historian John Barbour (died 1395) composed a now non-existent history of the ruling Stewart dynasty to glorify and promote the authority of this family. There is reason to suspect that, within this account, Barbour traced the king's descent to the ancient kings of Britain descended from Brutus. In the sixteenth century, the Scottish historian Hector Boece claimed that Walter's father was a certain Fleance, son of Banquho. According to Boece, Fleance was driven from Scotland into exile in Wales, where he had a liaison with a Welsh princess, a woman who came to be Walter's mother. Upon reaching manhood in Wales, Boece's account relates that Walter journeyed to his paternal homeland. Two authorities who certainly had access to Barbour's account were the Scottish historians Andrew Wyntoun and Walter Bower. Although neither of these men ever made note of a figure named Banquho, and Fleance is first specifically noted by Boece's account, it is clear that the now-lost account of Barbour did indeed accord the Stewarts a Welsh ancestry, and it is possible that Barbour traced the family's descent from the British kings through Fleance's Welsh wife. In any case, Fleance appears to represent Walter's historical grandfather, Flaald. There is no evidence that this man married into a native Welsh family.) Alan and Avelina had three sons: Jordan, William and Walter. (Note: These three sons of Alan and Avelina appear to have had a half-brother, a certain Simon, descended from Avelina and her second husband.)

Walter's father was a Breton knight who was granted lands in Shropshire by Henry I, King of England. Previous to this, Alan had acted as steward to the bishops of Dol in Brittany. Walter was a minor English landholder. He held North Stoke, north of Arundel, by way of a grant from his brother, William. There is reason to suspect that Walter also held Manhood, south of Chichester. He also held land at "Conelon" or "Couten", a place that possibly refers to Cound in Shropshire.

Walter appears to have arrived in Scotland in about 1136, during the reign of David I, King of Scotland. Following Henry's death in 1135, the Fitz Alans evidently sided with David in his support of the contested English royal claims of Henry's daughter, Matilda. Certainly, both William and Walter witnessed acts of Matilda in 1141. In any event, the date of Walter's introduction into Scotland may be marked by the original part of the so-called "foundation charter" of Melrose Abbey, which records Walter as a witness.

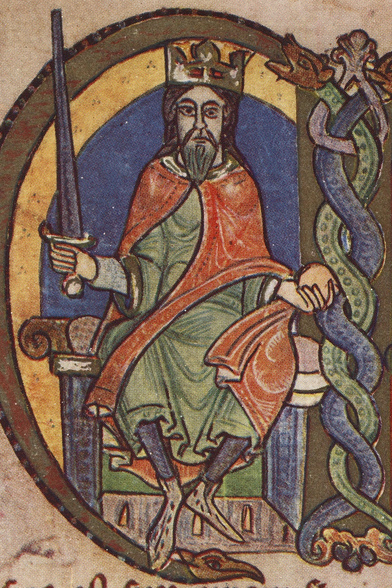
David I, King of Scotland as he is depicted in a mid-twelfth-century royal charter

Walter served as David's dapifer or senescallus (steward). He served in this capacity for three successive Scottish kings: David, Malcolm IV and William I. (Note: Walter's family originated from Dol in Brittany. Another family that appears to have originated from this region were the Biduns, and a member of this family, a certain Walter de Bidun, became David's chancellor.) Walter is increasingly attested by royal charters from about 1150, and it is possible that it was at about this time that David granted him the stewardship to be held heritably. As the king's steward, Walter would have been responsible for the day-to-day running of the king's household. Whilst the chamberlain was responsible for the king's sleeping compartments, the steward oversaw the king's hall. It is possible that David sought to replace the Gaelic office of rannaire ("food-divider") with that of the steward. This office certainly appears to have been a precursor to the stewardship. (Note: A rannaire active during David's reign was a certain Alguine mac Arcuil. According to the twelfth-century Vita Ailredi, an unnamed steward of David was highly jealous of the future St Ailred who apparently also acted as a steward (economus and dapifer) to the king. One possibility is that the unnamed vociferous opponent of St Ailred was Walter himself. Alternately, the steward in question could well have been either Alguine or his son. In any case, Alguine appears to have succeeded by his son, Gilla Andréis, who appears on record as a rannaire during Malcolm's reign.) Walter's ancestors were stewards to the Breton lords of Dol. In fact, his elder brother, Jordan, inherited this stewardship from their father, and held this office at the time of Walter's own establishment in Scotland. As such, it is probable that Walter possessed a degree of experience in the profession.

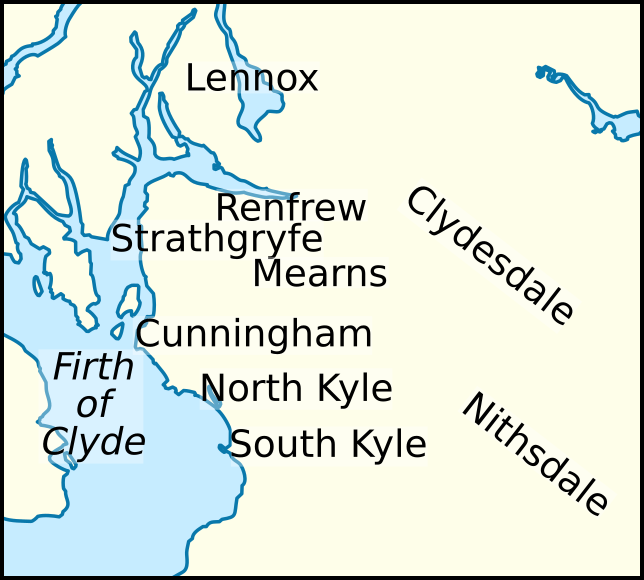
Twelfth-century secular lordships on the western seaboard of Scotland. Walter's domain included the depicted regions of Strathgryfe, Renfrew, Mearns and North Kyle. Clydesdale and South Kyle were royal lordships, whilst Cunningham was a Morville lordship.

Walter lived during a period in history when Scottish monarchs sought to attract men to their kingdom by promising them gifts of land. To such kings, royal authority depended upon their ability to give away territories in the peripheries of the realm. Although the twelfth-century Scottish monarchs did not create any new earldoms for the incoming Anglo-Norman magnates, they did grant them provincial lordships. The most important of these mid-century colonial establishments were: Annandale for Robert de Brus; Upper Eskdale and Ewesdale for Robert Avenel; Lauderdale and Cunningham for Hugh de Morville; Liddesdale for Ranulf de Sules; and Mearns, Strathgryfe, Renfrew and North Kyle for Walter himself. (Note: Whereas Walter became the king's steward, Hugh became the constable, and Ranulf became the butler. Whilst the steward was responsible for the king's household, the constable was in command of the king's knights, and the butler was in charge of the king's wine. Following Hugh's death in 1162, Walter seems to have been the most important lay member of the king's household.) As a result of their tenure in high office, and their dominating regional influence, these provincial lords were equal to the native Scottish earls in all but rank.

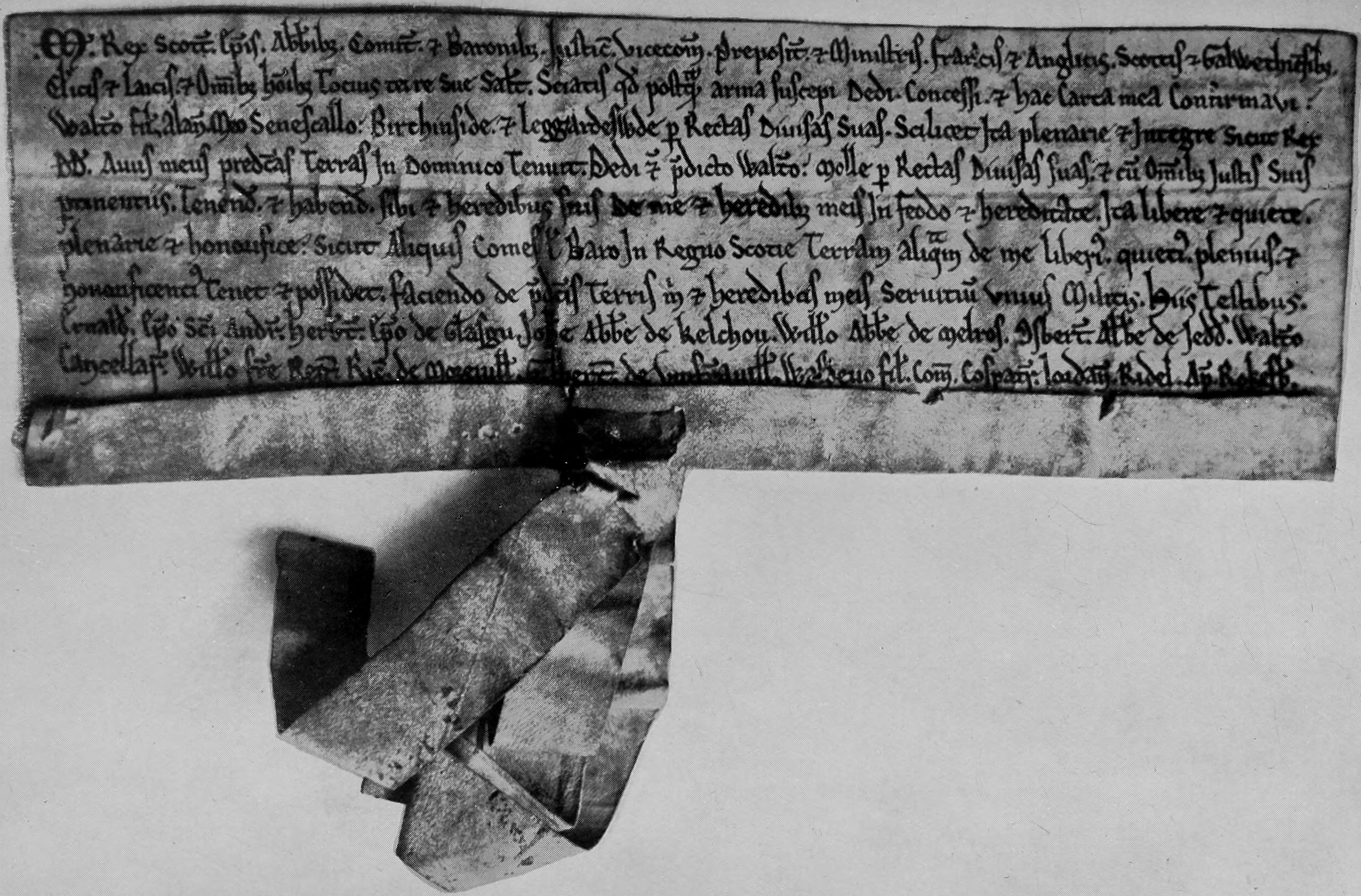
Walter's charter of Birkenside, Legerwood and Mow from Malcolm IV, King of Scotland

In 1161×1162, Malcolm confirmed Walter's stewardship, and confirmed David's grants of Renfrew, Paisley, Pollock, "Talahret", Cathcart, Dripps, Mearns, Eaglesham, Lochwinnoch and Innerwick. He also granted Walter West Partick, Inchinnan, Stenton, Hassenden, Legerwood and Birkenside, as well as a toft with twenty acres in every burgh and demesne in the realm. For this grant, Walter owed his sovereign the service of five knights. The grant of lodgings in every important royal settlement would have only been entrusted to people particularly close to the king, and to those who were expected to travel with him. The impressive list of twenty-nine eminent men who attested this transaction appears to be evidence that the proceedings took place in a public setting before the royal court.

At some point during his career, Walter received North Kyle from either David or Malcolm. (Note: This northern half of Kyle came to be variously known as "Kyle Stewart" or "Walter's Kyle".) Also in 1161×1162—perhaps on the same date as Malcolm's aforesaid charter to Walter—the king granted Walter the lands of Mow for the service of one knight. There is reason to suspect that David's original grant of lands to Walter took place in 1136. Certainly in 1139×1146, Walter witnessed a charter of David to the cathedral of Glasgow in which the king invested the cathedral with assets from Carrick, Cunningham, Strathgryfe and Kyle. (Note: This charter is one of several that mark the first appearance of Walter in contemporary sources.) In 1165, Walter is stated to have held lands worth two knight's fees in Shropshire. As such, the vast majority of his holdings were located north of the Anglo-Scottish border.

== Ecclesiastical actions ==
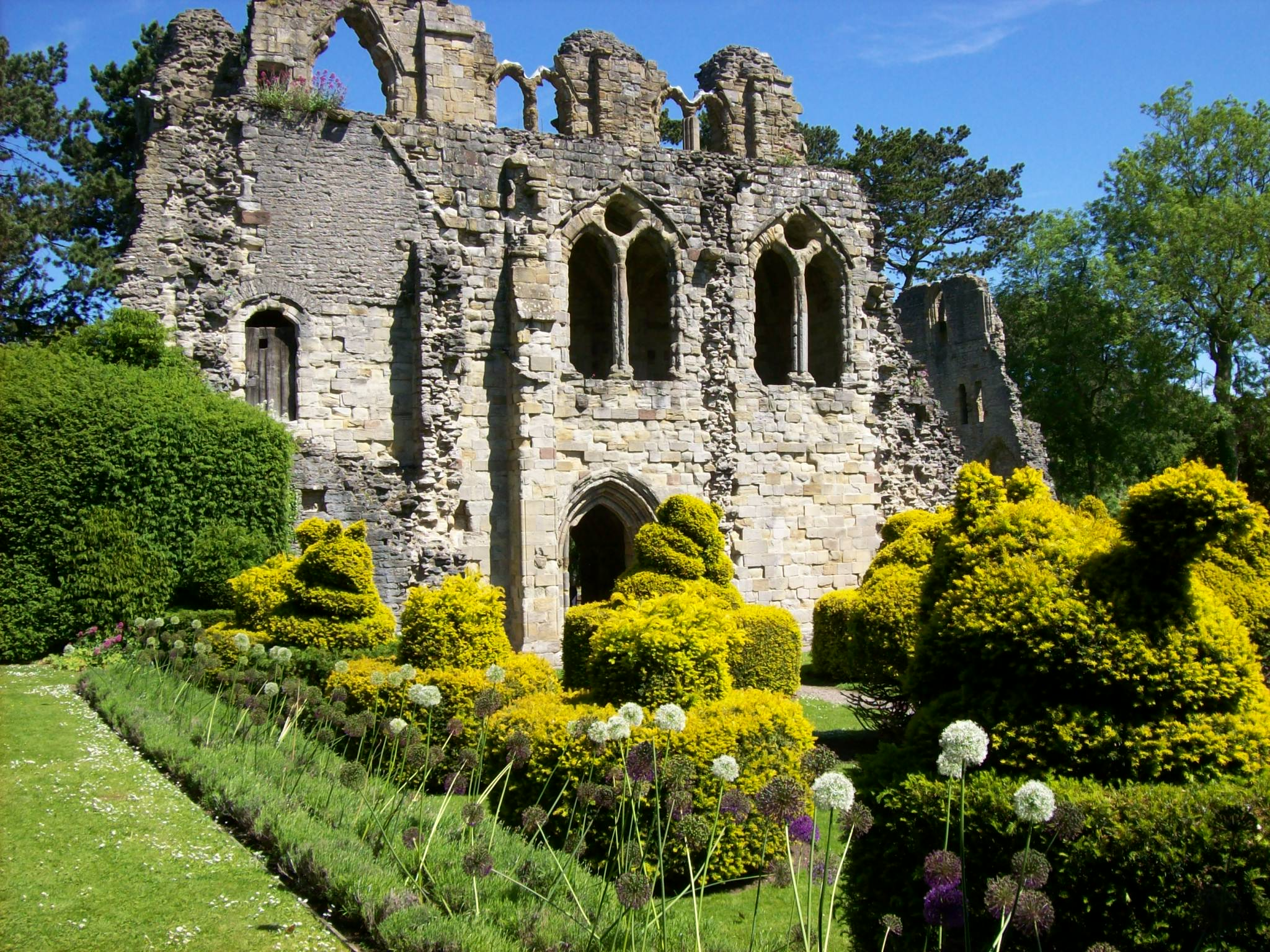
Ruinous Wenlock Priory. Walter appears to have been a devotee of this English Cluniac priory.

Walter was a benefactor of Melrose Abbey, and granted this religious house the lands of Mauchline in Ayrshire. (Note: Although William confirmed this grant, Walter still owed the king service for the lands.) He also granted his lands in Dunfermline and Inverkeithing to Dunfermline Abbey.

Walter founded Paisley Priory in about 1163. This religious house was initially established at Renfrew—at King's Inch near Renfrew Castle—before removing to Paisley within a few years. (Note: In a charter of his to Paisley Priory in 1165×1173, Walter specifically made note of the land where the monks first lived at Paisley. A charter of Malcolm to Paisley Priory in 1163×1165 mentions a priory at King's Inch from where the Paisley monks relocated. A papal bull of Pope Alexander III, dating to 1173, states that the monks lived near the mill of Renfrew before removing to Paisley. The charter of 1165×1173 notes that Walter possessed a hall near the priory. One possibility is that this hall is identical to the Blackhall (Nigram Aulam), an apparent hunting lodge in the Paisley area, possessed by later descendants of Walter. The existing structure at Blackhall evidently dates to the sixteenth century. This site has not been excavated, and it is unknown what structures may have existed there in the twelfth and thirteenth centuries.) The fact that Walter made this a Cluniac monastery could be evidence that he was personally devoted to the Cluniac Wenlock Priory in Shropshire. Alternately, the decision to associate Wenlock with his foundation at Renfrew could have stemmed from a devotion to the cult of Wenlock's patron saint: St Milburga. (Note: Like the priory of Wenlock, Paisley Priory was dedicated in part to St Milburga. It was also dedicated in part to St Mirin, who could have been locally associated with Paisely. The priory of Paisley became an abbey in 1219. Whilst the foundation charter of Paisley Priory declares that the house was established "to the honour of God", after its relocation to Paisley it was stated to have been made "to God and St Mary and the church of St James and St Mirin and St Milburga of Paisley".)

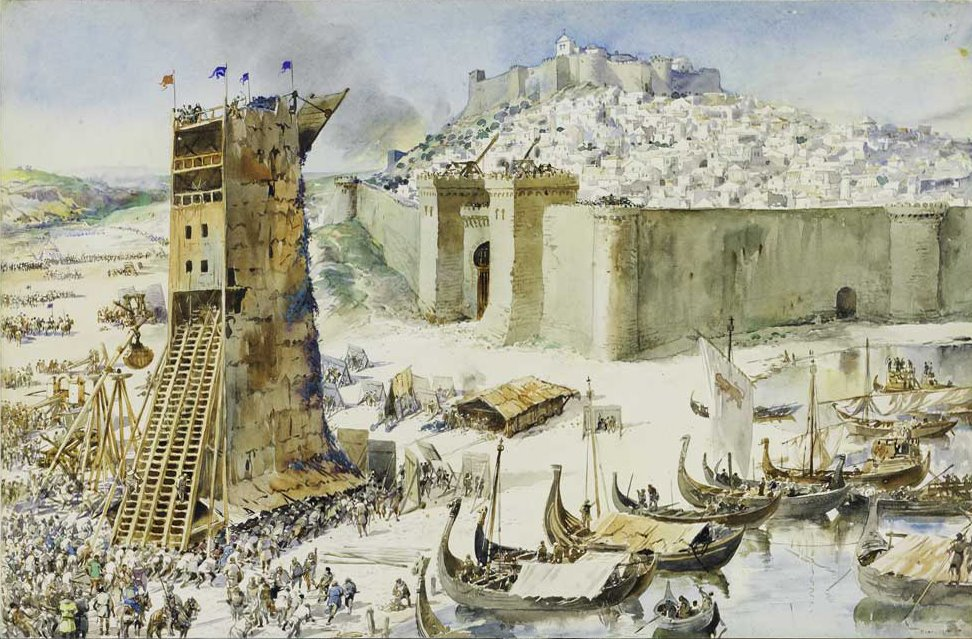
An early-twentieth-century depiction of the Siege of Lisbon in 1147. There is reason to suspect that Walter was amongst the Scots who took part in the campaign to liberate Lisbon from the Moors.

Walter's priory at Paisley was dedicated in part to St James the Greater. This, coupled with the fact that Walter did not witness any of David's acts during a span of time in 1143×1145, could be evidence that Walter undertook a pilgrimage to the shrine of St James the Greater at Santiago de Compostela. (Note: In Scotland, devotion to St James appears to have been peculiar to Walter's family. The personal name James was virtually unknown there in about 1100. However, it became popular within the family in later generations. A thirteenth-century family member who bore the name was James Stewart, Steward of Scotland, whose father, Alexander Stewart, Steward of Scotland, also appears to have undertaken a pilgrimage to Santiago de Compostela. Whilst it is possible that James was bestowed this name on account of his father's pilgrimage, the name could have also stemmed from the family's earlier dedication to the saint.) In the spring of 1147, Scots joined an Anglo-Flemish fleet in Dartmouth, and set off to join the Second Crusade. The presence of Scots in this multi-ethnic fighting force is specifically attested by the twelfth-century texts De expugnatione Lyxbonensi and Gesta Friderici imperatoris. In June, this fleet of Englishmen, Flemings, Normans, Rhinelanders and Scots arrived at Lisbon, and joined the King of Portugal's months-long siege of the city. Some of the adventurers who participated in the expedition—a fifty-ship detachment of Rhinelanders—clearly visited Santiago de Compostela. It is possible that Walter was one of the Scots who took part in the Lisbon expedition.

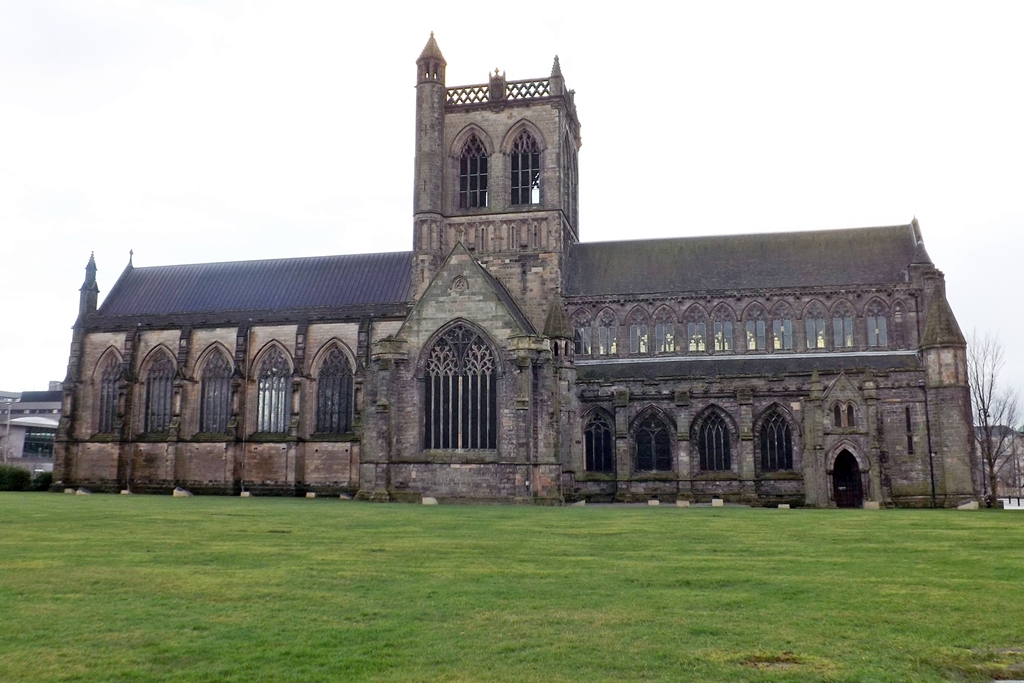
Paisley Abbey. Walter founded the original priory in about 1163.

Renfrew may well have served as the caput of the Strathgryfe group of holdings held by Walter, and could have been the main caput of all his holdings. (Note: Renfrew was made a burgh during David's reign. The first notice of Renfrew Castle occurs in 1163×1165.) The fact that he chose Paisley to serve as a priory does not necessarily mean that Renfrew was his principal caput. There is reason to suspect that North Kyle served as Walter's power centre. For example, Walter granted this religious house a tithe from all his lands except North Kyle. The fact that he granted away only one piece of land in North Kyle—as opposed to his extensive donations elsewhere—suggests that North Kyle was his largest block of his own demesne. As such, the archaeological evidence of a twelfth-century motte at Dundonald could indicate that Walter constructed Dundonald Castle, an earth and timber fortress, as his principal caput. (Note: The castle was probably the family's caput in North Kyle.)

The uneven distribution of Walter's grants to Paisley Priory seems to have been a result of the fact that he had subinfeudated most of Strathgryfe by the time of its establishment. Walter's extensive territories consisted of regions inhabited by native speakers of English, Cumbric and Gaelic. From the years spanning 1160–1241, there are roughly one hundred vassals, tenants and dependants of Walter and his succeeding son and grandson. A considerable number of these dependants were drawn from the vicinity of the Fitz Alan lands in Shropshire. The latter region was largely Welsh-speaking at the time, and it is possible that these languages were then mutually intelligible with Breton, Cumbric. If so, it could indicate that Walter and his dependents were purposely settled in the west to take advantage of this linguistic affiliation. As such, it may have been hoped that such incoming settlers would possess a degree of legitimacy from the natives as "fellow Britons". Alternately, the early concentration of Walter's fiefs in the area may reflect a policy of defending what was a vulnerable coastline and doorway to Scotland.

== Eschina de Londres ==
Image a

Image b

Nineteenth-century depictions of Walter's seal (image a) and counter-seal (image b). The front of the seal displays a mounted knight with a shield, lance and pennon. The counter-seal shows a warrior, holding with a spear or staff in his right hand, leaning against a pillar. (Note: Walter's seal is non-heraldic. It was attached to a charter of his to Melrose Abbey concerning the lands of Mauchline. The legend on the seal's front face reads: "SIGILLVM·WALTERI·FILII·ALANI DAPIFERI·REG". Whilst the earliest-known seal of his son is also non-heraldic, a later one bears the earliest depiction of the heraldic fess chequy borne by the Stewart family.)

Walter was married to Eschina de Londres (fl. 1177×1198). It is likely that the king—either David or Malcolm—arranged the union. Eschina is variously accorded locative names such as de Londres and de Molle. The former name appears to indicate that her father was a member of the Londres (or London) family. One possibility is that this man was Richard de London. The various forms of Eschina's locative surname de Molle could indicate that she was a maternal granddaughter and heir of a previous Lord of Mow: a certain Uhtred, son of Liulf. (Note: In a grant to Paisley Abbey, Eschina is styled "lady of Mow".) Uhtred is known to have granted the church of Mow to Kelso Abbey during David's reign.

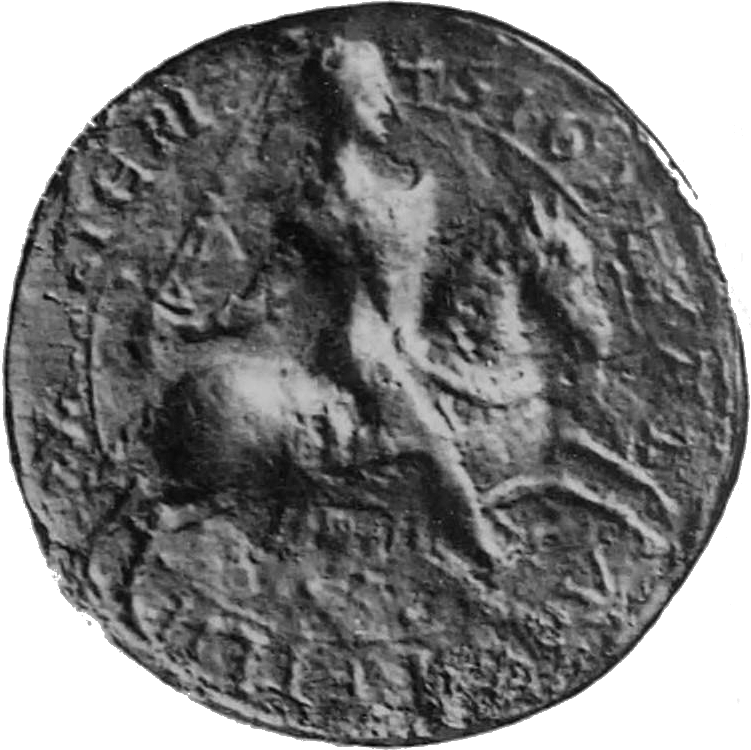
A seal of Walter and Eschina's son, Alan, displaying the latter's coat of arms. Alan's seal is the earliest depiction of heraldry borne by the Stewart family.

If Eschina indeed possessed an inherited claim to Mow, it is possible that Walter's grant of this territory was given from the king in the context of Walter's marriage to her. The fact that Uhtred seems to have had a son and a brother could be evidence that the king had overridden the inheritance rights of Uhtred's male heirs. On the other hand, an alternate possibility is that Eschina only possessed rights to Mow as a result of her marriage to Walter.

Walter was Eschina's first husband. She survived Walter, and her second husband was probably Henry de Cormunnock, by whom she had two daughters: Cecilia and Maud. Eschina's grant to Paisley Priory records that her daughter, Margaret, was buried there. A daughter of Walter may have been Christina, a widow of William de Brus, Lord of Annandale, and second wife of Patrick I, Earl of Dunbar. Christina's kinship with Walter's family could account for the Dunbars' later possession of Birkenside.

== Galloway ==
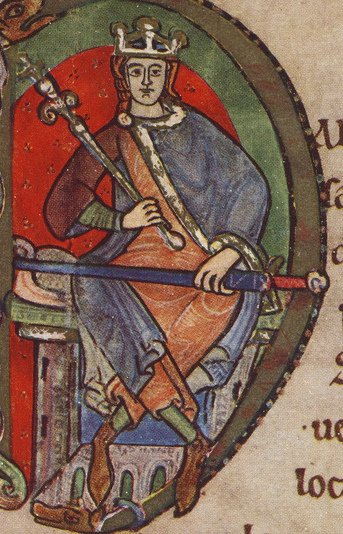
Malcolm IV as he is depicted in a mid-twelfth-century royal charter. Walter may have campaigned with the king on the Continent.

Walter witnessed an act by Malcolm at Les Andelys in Normandy. This charter appears to reveal that Walter was one of the Scottish barons who accompanied the king on his campaign against the Count of Toulouse in 1159. This record is the only known act of the king on the Continent. Malcolm returned to Scotland in 1160, having spent months campaigning in the service of the English. Upon his return, the king was forced to confront an attempted coup at Perth. Having successfully dealt with this considerable number of disaffected magnates, the twelfth- to thirteenth-century Chronicle of Holyrood and Chronicle of Melrose reveal that Malcolm launched three military expeditions into Galloway. Although the names of the king's accomplices are unrecorded, Walter was probably among them.

The circumstances surrounding these invasions are unclear; what is clear, however, is that Fergus, Lord of Galloway submitted to the Scots before the end of the year. Specifically, according to the thirteenth-century Gesta Annalia I, once the Scots subdued the Gallovidians, the conquerors forced Fergus to retire to Holyrood Abbey, and hand over his son, Uhtred, as a royal hostage. On one hand, Fergus himself may have precipitated Malcolm's Gallovian campaign, by raiding the territory between the rivers Urr and Nith. The fact that the Chronicle of Holyrood describes Malcolm's Gallovidian opponents as "federate enemies", and makes no mention of his sons, suggests that Fergus was supported by other accomplices. In fact, Malcolm may have encountered an alliance between Fergus and Somairle mac Gilla Brigte, King of the Isles.

== The Isles ==
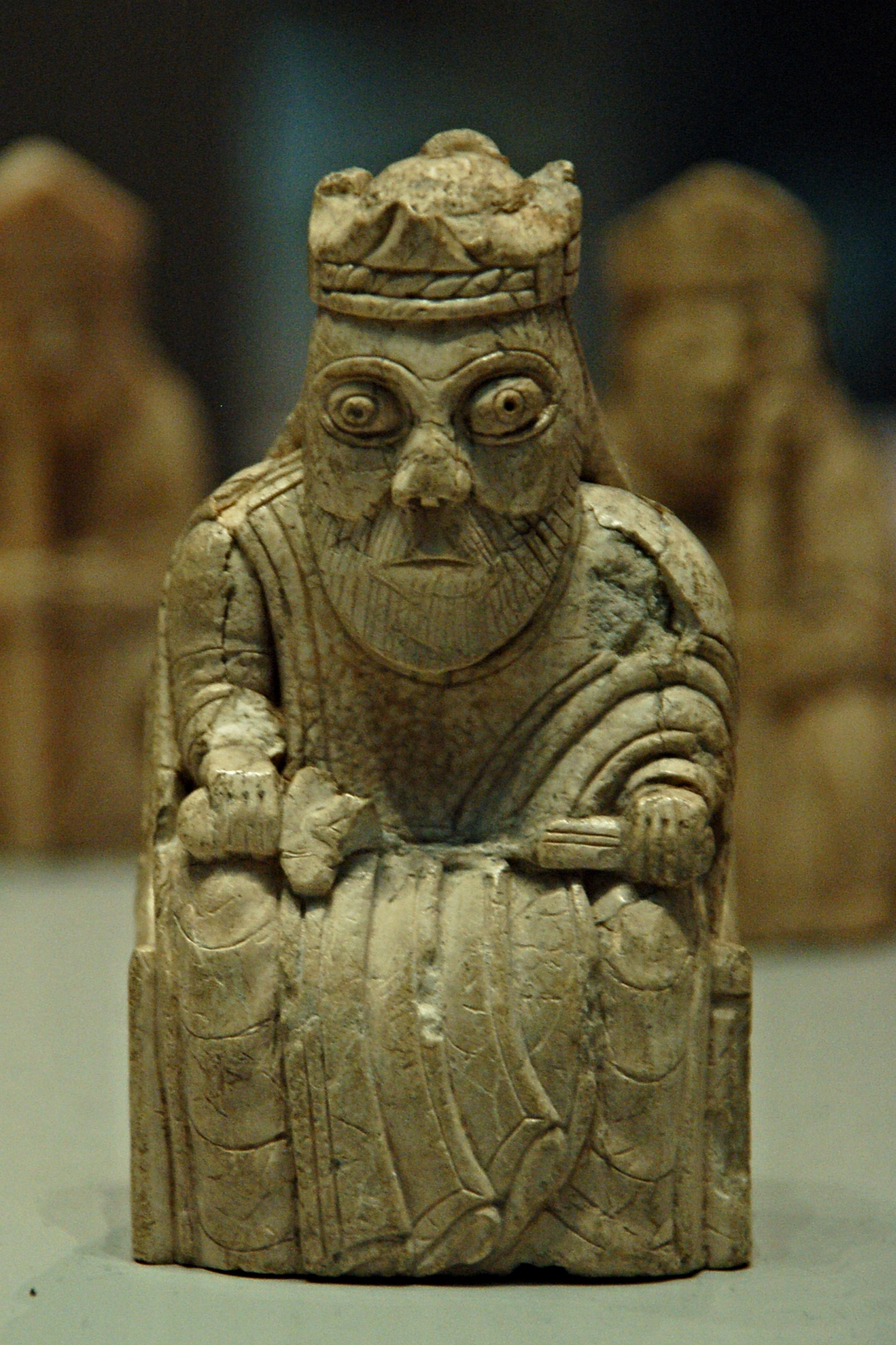
A king gaming piece of the so-called Lewis chessmen (Note: Comprising some four sets, the pieces are thought to have been crafted in Norway in the twelfth and thirteenth centuries.)

In 1164, Somairle launched an invasion of Scotland. This seaborne campaign is attested by sources such as: the fourteenth-century Annals of Tigernach, the fifteenth- to sixteenth-century Annals of Ulster, the twelfth-century Carmen de Morte Sumerledi, the thirteenth-century Chronica of Roger de Hoveden, the Chronicle of Holyrood, the thirteenth- to fourteenth-century Chronicles of Mann, the Chronicle of Melrose, Gesta Annalia I, the fifteenth-century Mac Carthaigh's Book, and the fifteenth-century Scotichronicon.

The various depictions of Somairle's forces—stated to have been drawn from Argyll, Dublin and the Isles—appear to reflect the remarkable reach of power that this man possessed at his peak. According to the Chronicle of Melrose, Somairle landed at Renfrew, and was defeated and slain by the people of the district. (Note: At a later date, Somairle's son, Ragnall, and the latter's wife, Fonia, are reported to have made donations to Paisley Priory. The circumstances surrounding these gifts are uncertain. The fact that the monks of Paisley were originally based at King's Inch, could mean that they tended to the body of Somairle in the immediate aftermath of his defeat and death.) This stated location of Renfrew could be evidence that the target of Somairle's strike was Walter. Nevertheless, the leadership of the Scottish forces is uncertain. It is conceivable that the commander was one of the three principal men of the region: Herbert, Bishop of Glasgow, Baldwin, Sheriff of Lanark/Clydesdale, and Walter himself. Whilst there is reason to suspect that Somairle focused his offensive upon Walter's lordship at Renfrew, it is also possible that Hebert, as Malcolm's agent in the west, was the intended target. Certainly, Carmen de Morte Sumerledi associates Herbert with the victory, and makes no mention of Walter or any Scottish royal forces. On the other hand, Baldwin's nearby lands of Inverkip and Houston were passed by Somairle's naval forces, suggesting that it was either Baldwin or his followers who engaged and overcame the invaders. (Note: In the eighteenth century, the battle was locally alleged to have been marked by a particular stone-topped mound. By the end of the nineteenth century, no trace of the mound could be found.)

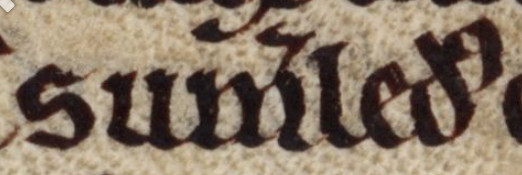
The name of Somairle mac Gilla Brigte as it appears on folio 133r of Cambridge Corpus Christi College 139 (Carmen de Morte Sumerledi): "Sumerledus"

Exactly why Somairle struck out at the Scots is unknown. This man's rise to power appears to coincide with an apparent weakening of Scottish royal authority in Argyll. Although David may well have regarded Argyll as a Scottish tributary, Somairle's ensuing career clearly reveals that the latter regarded himself a fully independent ruler. Somairle's first attestation by a contemporary source occurs in 1153, when the Chronicle of Holyrood reports that he backed the cause of his nepotes, the Meic Máel Coluim, in an unsuccessful coup after David's death. These nepotes—possibly nephews or grandsons of Somairle—were the sons of Máel Coluim mac Alasdair, a claimant to the Scottish throne, descended from an elder brother of David, Alexander I, King of Scotland. Four years later Somairle launched his final invasion of Scotland, and it is possible that it was conducted in the context of another attempt to support Máel Coluim's claim to the Scottish throne.

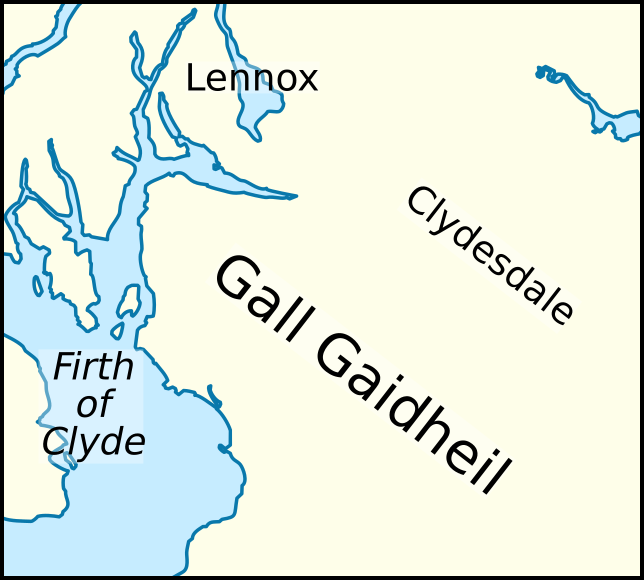
Some twelfth-century lordships, created by David I and Malcolm IV, appear to have carved out of territories previously occupied by the Gall Gaidheil. Somairle may have attempted to regain these lands from the Scots.

Another possibility is that Somairle was attempting to secure a swathe of territory that had only recently been secured by the Scottish Crown. Although there is no record of Somairle before 1153, his family was evidently involved in an earlier insurrection by Máel Coluim against David that ended with Máel Coluim's capture and imprisonment in 1134. (Note: On at least two occasions that may date before 1134, David temporarily based himself at Irvine in Cunningham, a strategic coastal site from where Scottish forces may have conducted seaborne military operations against Malcolm's western allies. The twelfth-century Relatio de Standardo reveals that David received English military assistance against Máel Coluim. This source specifies that a force against Máel Coluim was mustered at Carlisle, and notes successful naval campaigns conducted against David's enemies, which suggests that Máel Coluim's support was indeed centred in Scotland's western coastal periphery. By the mid-1130s, David had not only succeeded in securing Máel Coluim, but also appears to have gained recognition of his overlordship of Argyll.) An aftereffect of this failed insurgency may be perceptible in a Scottish royal charter issued at Cadzow in about 1136. This source records the Scottish Crown's claim to cáin in Carrick, Kyle, Cunningham and Strathgryfe. Historically, this region appears to have once formed part of the territory dominated by the Gall Gaidheil, a people of mixed Scandinavian and Gaelic ethnicity. One possibility is that these lands had formerly comprised part of a Gall Gaidheil realm before the Scottish Crown overcame Máel Coluim and his supporters. The Cadzow charter is one of several that mark the earliest record of Fergus. This man's attestation could indicate that while Somairle's family may have suffered marginalisation as a result of Máel Coluim's defeat and David's consolidation of the region, Fergus and his family could have conversely profited at this time as supporters of David's cause. The record of Fergus amongst the Scottish elite at Cadzow is certainly evidence of the increasing reach of David's royal authority in the 1130s.

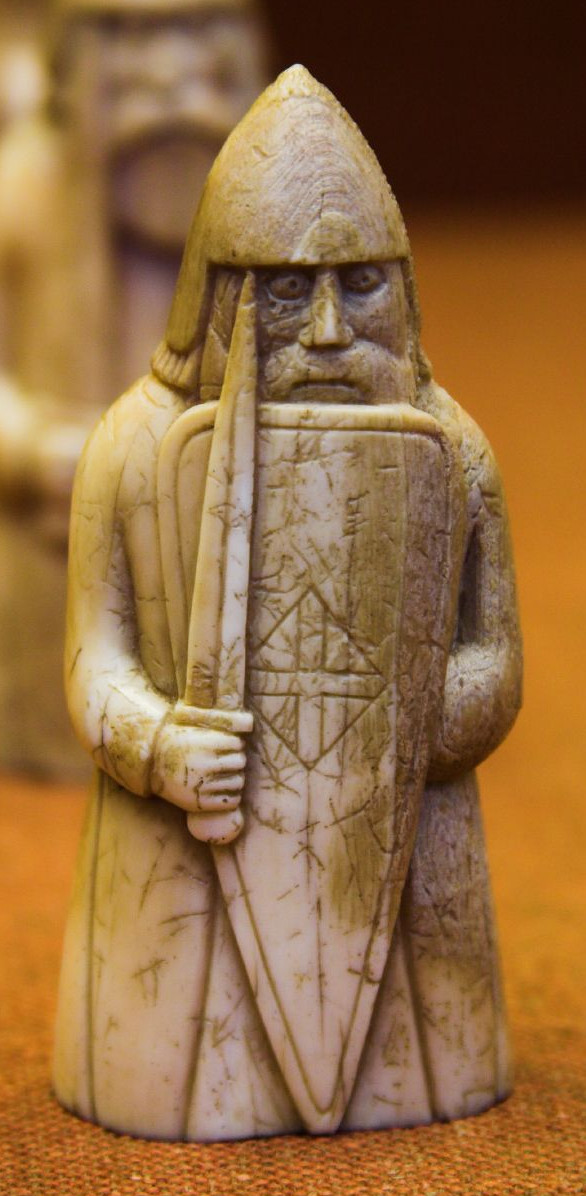
A rook gaming piece of the Lewis chessmen (Note: The Scandinavian connections of leading members of the Isles may have been reflected in their military armament, and could have resembled that depicted upon such gaming pieces.)

Another figure first attested by these charters is Walter, who may have been granted the lands of Strathgryfe, Renfrew, Mearns and North Kyle on the occasion of David's grant of cáin. One explanation for Somairle's invasion is that he may have been compelled to counter a threat that Walter—and other recently enfeoffed Scottish magnates—posed to his authority. A catalyst of this collision of competing spheres of influence may have been the vacuum left by the assassination of Somairle's father-in-law, Óláfr Guðrøðarson, King of the Isles, in 1153. Although the political uncertainty following Óláfr's elimination would have certainly posed a threat to the Scots, the concurrent build-up of Scottish power along the western seaboard—particularly exemplified by Walter's expansive territorial grants in the region—meant that the Scots were also positioned to capitalise upon the situation. In fact, there is reason to suspect that, during Malcolm's reign—and perhaps with Malcolm's consent—Walter began to extend his own authority into the Firth of Clyde, the islands of the Clyde, the southern shores of Cowal and the fringes of Argyll. (Note: The first of Walter's family to hold lordship over Bute may have been his son, Alan. By about 1200, during the latter's career, the family certainly seems to have gained control of the island. By the latter half of the thirteenth century, the family certainly held authority over Cowal.)

The allotment of Scottish fiefs along the western seaboard suggests that these lands were settled in the context of defending the Scottish realm from external threats located in Galloway and the Isles. It was probably in this context that substantial western lordships were granted to Hugh de Morville, Robert de Brus and Walter. As such, the mid-part of the twelfth century saw a steady consolidation of Scottish power along the western seaboard by some of the realm's greatest magnates—men who could well have encroached into Somairle's sphere of influence. (Note: The catalyst for the establishment of castles along the River Clyde could well have been the potential threat posed by Somairle.)

The remarkably poor health of Malcolm—a man who went on to die before reaching the age of twenty-five—combined with the rising power of Somairle along Scotland's western seaboard, could account for Malcolm's confirmation Walter's stewardship and lands in 1161×1162. As such, Walter may have sought written confirmation of his rights in light of the external threats that faced the Scottish Crown. In fact, one possibility is that the king's serious illness was a specific impetus for Somairle's campaign. Somairle may have intended to seize upon Malcolm's poor health to strike out at the Scots and limit the western spread of their influence.

== Death and successors ==
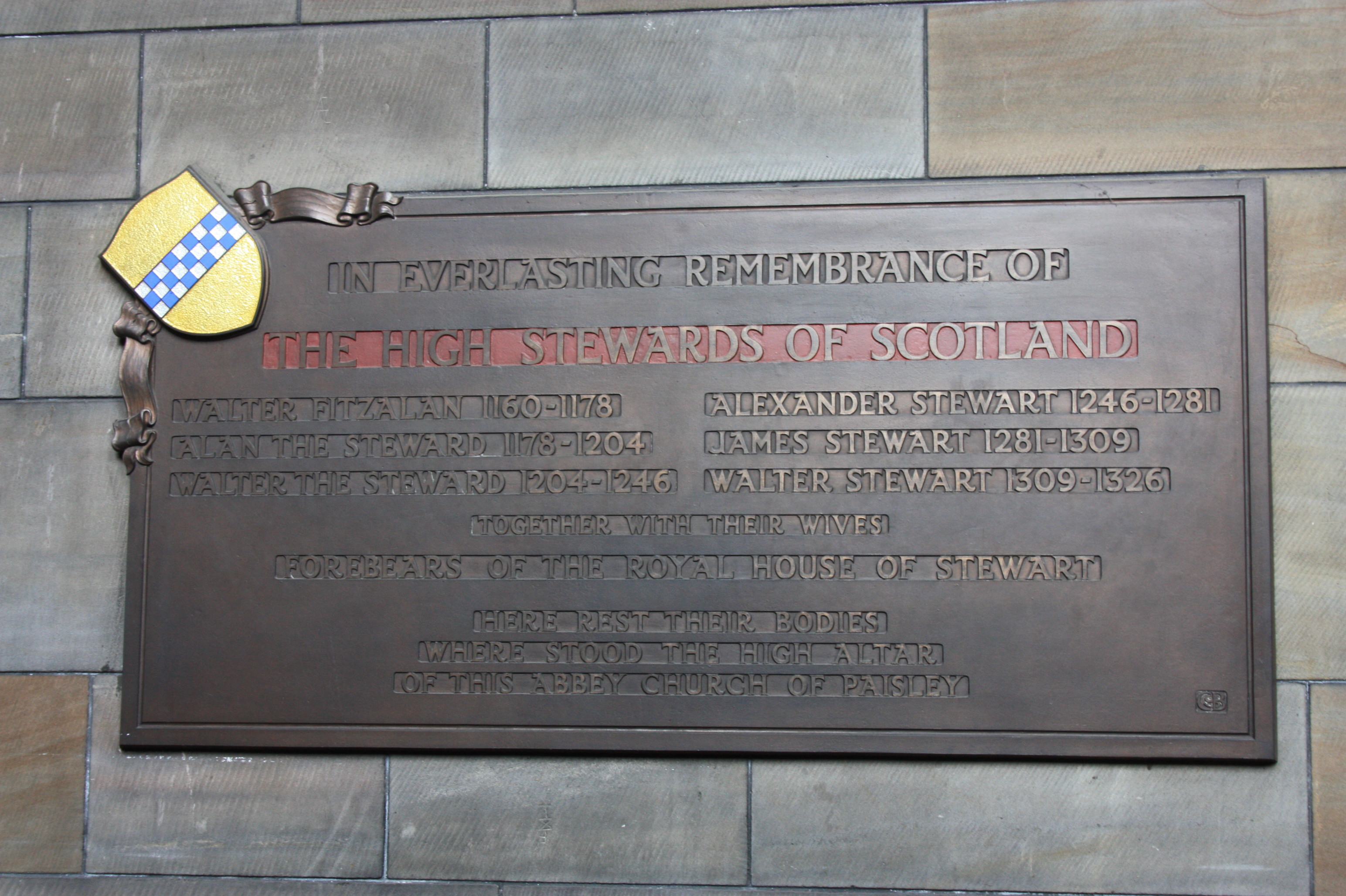
Memorial to the stewards of Scotland at Paisley Abbey

Walter served as steward until his death in 1177. Before his demise, Walter retired to Melrose Abbey, and died there a lay member of the monastery. He was buried at Paisley. Walter's son and successor, Alan, does not appear to have equalled Walter's consistent attendance of the royal court. (Note: Whilst Walter witnessed seventy-four and fifty-four royal acts during the respective reigns of Malcolm and William, Alan witnessed forty-seven during William's reign.)

It was during the tenure of Walter's great-grandson, Alexander Stewart, Steward of Scotland, that the title of dapifer regis Scotie ("steward of the king of Scotland") came to be replaced by the style senescallus Scotie ("steward of Scotland"). (Note: Alexander's father (Walter's like-named grandson) Walter fitz Alan II, Steward of Scotland is styled dapifer regis Scotie in his earliest acts, and senescallus in at least one later act. This new terminology appears to correspond to the evolution of the office: from steward of the king's household to the steward of the realm.) It was also during this generation that forms of the surname Stewart began to be borne by Walter's descendants. Specifically, his like-named great-grandson, Walter Stewart, Earl of Menteith, is the first such descendant known to have adopted senescallus as a surname without having possessed the office of steward. (Note: The surname Stewart is specifically derived from the Middle English stiward, which in turn stems from the Old English stigweard ("household guardian"). These terms were equivalents of the Middle English/Old French seneschal, seneshal.) Walter was the founder of the Stewart family, from which descended the royal Stewart dynasty. (Note: Until the generation of Walter's great-grandson, his branch of the Fitz Alan family alternated between the names Alan and Walter. The former name is of Breton origin, and its popularity in Scotland is mostly due to the Stewart family. Walter's succeeding great-grandson, like many other men of his generation, was apparently named after Alexander II, King of Scotland.)
