= William Mirtle =

- Born: 24 December 1739; Edinburgh, Scotland
- Died: c. 1769; Morang, Nepal
- Occupation(s): Mariner, Explorer
- Spouse: Magdalene
- Children: Mary (baptised 30 Oct 1766) Eleanor (baptised 27 Apr 1770)

William Mirtle (24 December 1739 – c. 1769) was a Scottish mariner and explorer, primarily known for his time with the Bengal Pilot Service (or the Bombay Marine) and the British East India Company. On 22 December 1768, he was granted a coat of arms for “having been on the 7th day of January 1763 taken by a French Squadron cruising off Bengal in the East Indies and by desperate attempt overcoming the crew of the vessel whereon he was prisoner, by which success he regained his liberty and got safe to Calcutta where his critical intelligence of the enemy proved of essential service to the Commerce which the Factory testified by public thanks. After which engaging as a volunteer he served with reputation having likewise had the happiness to succeed in establishing an important fir trade for masts in the interior parts of Bengal with the Mountain Rajas”.

== Biography ==
=== Early life ===
William Mirtle was born 24 December 1739 to Thomas Mirtle, brewer in Edinburgh, and his wife Jean Rannie. Jean was the niece of Sir David Rannie (1 July 1716 - 17 November 1764), who made a fortune with the East India Company, later returning to Scotland and purchasing Melville Castle.

By 1758, William had followed in his great-uncle's footsteps, and enlisted with the East India Company, serving as a mate on the snow Speedwell.

=== A French fleet at Balasore ===
In 1763 the French privateers Vengeur, Fidèle, and Condé, were cruising in Balasore Roads and captured some English ships, which caused a great panic in Calcutta.

At a consultation held at Fort William on 12 January 1763, Peter Amyatt Esq., President and Council of Fort William, informed the Agent Board ... “that the Chowky Boat arrived at Town last night at 12 o’clock with William Mirtle on Board, late Mate of the “Speedwell” Snow (under) Captain Ramsay, who brings the following intelligence: Namely, that they were taken on the 7th Instant in 25 fathoms of water by a French Squadron consisting of two Ships & Frigate which is cruising in Balasore & has made besides the following Prizes Vizt. The “Walpole”, bound to Madras, the “Grampus” Pilot Sloop, Mr. Savage Pilot, & a Sloop from Chittagong supposed to be the “Clive”. That he (Mirtle) on the morning of the 9th repossessed himself of the “Speedwell” & was pushing in for the River, but finding he was in danger of being again taken by the French Frigate he took to his Boat with ten Lascars and made his escape.”

In the debate that followed it was decided that several ships should remain at Kedgeree, but that Pilots should be sent aboard them with instructions to sail up the Hooghly River if the enemy attacked, and that twenty sepoys should be detailed to each ship as a further safeguard. It was also decided to send a sloop to cruise off Palmyras Point to warn inbound ships, and that another sloop (well armed and manned) should watch the motions of the French squadron and annoy any boats or sloops they may send into the river.

The only other event of importance during the French squadron's visit to Balasore was a fight with the East Indiaman Winchelsea, which escaped after an engagement lasting for two hours.

=== Fir timber merchant and explorer ===
By 1766, William had become a timber collector in the Purnia district, and spent time exploring the interior of India towards the Nepalese border, gaining extensive knowledge of the Hill States of India and of the fir trade there.

Hillslap Tower in 1889

=== Death and afterward ===
In 1769, William Mirtle was deputed to the Morang country to obtain wood for masts, tar, pitch, and turpentine, but he died before completing his mission. On his death, the task was entrusted to Francis Peacock and James Christie.

=== Hillslap Tower and estate ===
The Hillslap (or Hillslope) estate, which was originally known as Calfhill, lies to the northeast of Galashiels, Scotland. This estate remained in the possession of the Cairncross family from 1569 to 1759, when, owing to the death of the sixth and last laird, Hugh Cairncross, without issue, it passed into the hands of descendants of females of the house.

The legal fight for succession took until 1769, and included William Mirtle as one of the claimants. His father, Thomas Mirtle, provided proofs of relation to Alison Cairncross, a daughter of Nicol Cairncross, the second, of Hillslop. These proofs consisted of charges granted by Thomas Martle, the great-grandfather of William Mirtle, to the Cairncross family acknowledging receipt of tocher paid to Thomas Martle with respect to his marriage to Alison Cairncross.

On 9 March 1769, the House of Lords ruled in favour of "William Myrtle, son of the deceased Thomas Myrtle, brewer in Edinburgh" and his other claimants, William Heatly, Thomas Mill, and Alexander Home.

William was in India at the time, and died shortly after his legal victory. The estate soon became the property of Mr. William Patterson, a wealthy tanner in Galashiels.

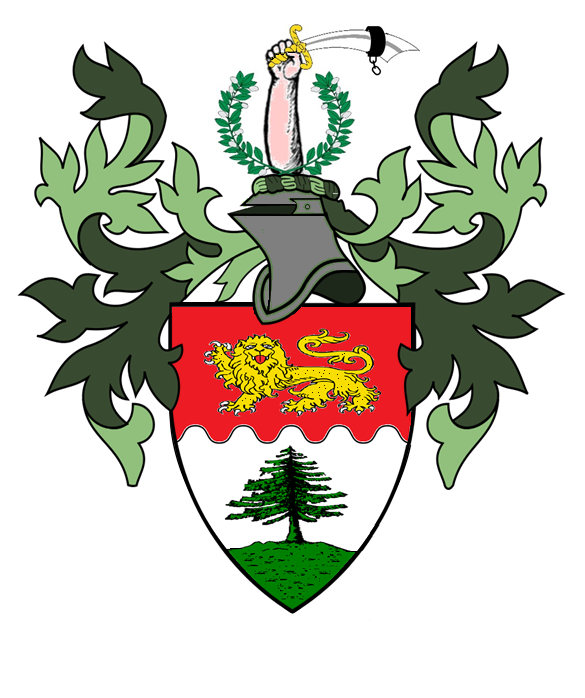
William Mirtle: Coat of Arms

== Honours, decorations, awards, and distinctions ==
A grant of Arms and Crest to "William Mirtle of Calcutta in the Kingdom of Bengal, Gentleman, only son of Thomas Mirtle of the City of Edinburgh, deceased, by Jane his wife, daughter of David Rannie of the same city and grandson of William Mirtle", was granted on 22 December 1768 as follows:

Per fess wavy Gules and Argent in Chief a Lion passant guardant Erminois and in Base on a Mount Vert a Fir-tree proper. Crest: A Dexter Arm Erect encircled by a Myrtle Branch in the Hand a Scimitar proper Pommel and Hilt Gold on the Blade a Shackle severed Sable.

The text of the grant states that Mirtle served more than 10 years in the East India Company.

== See also ==
- East India Company
