= King's Inch =

Small Scottish island

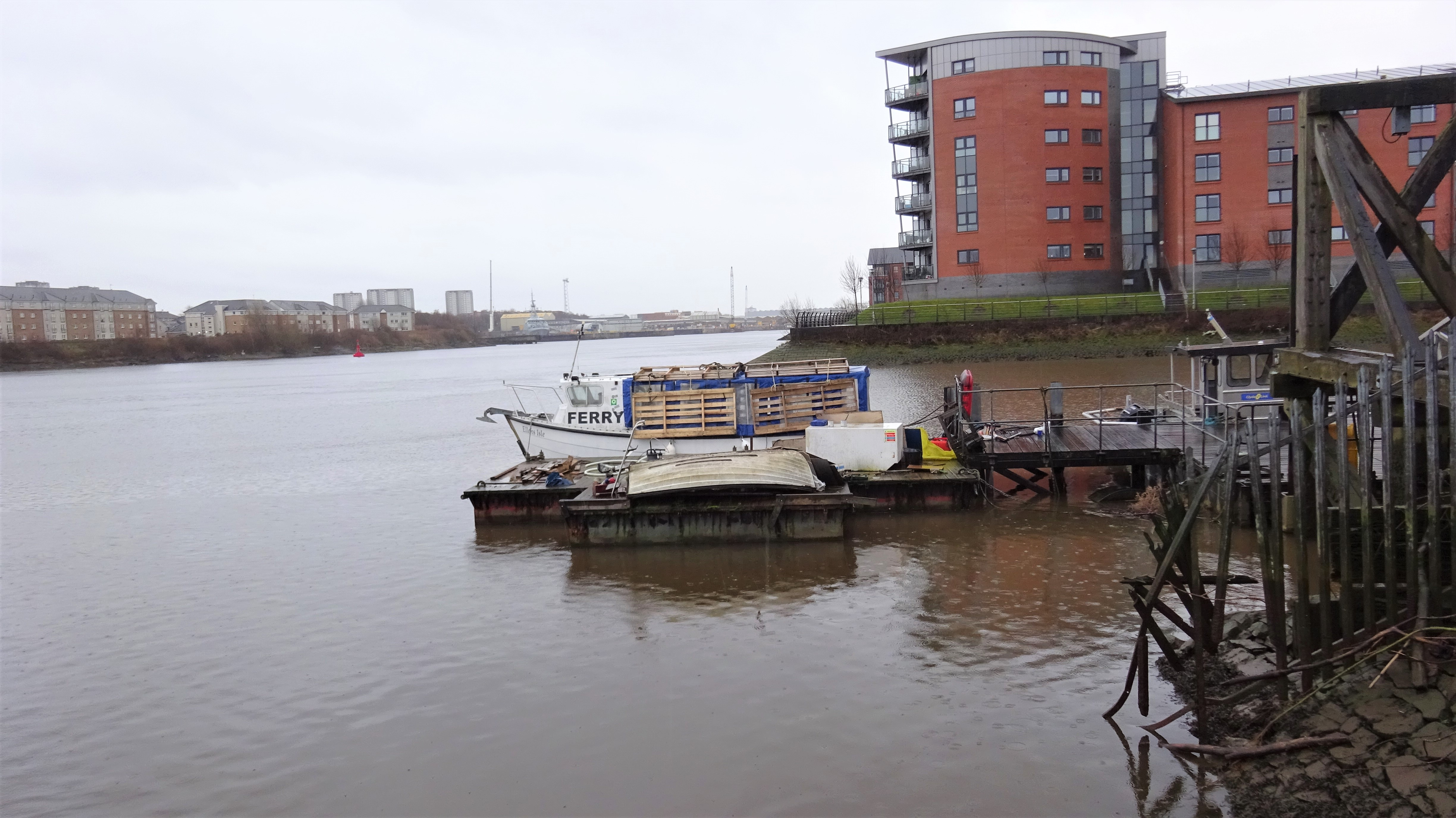
- King's Inch and the Ferry Village from the Renfrew Ferry

Location
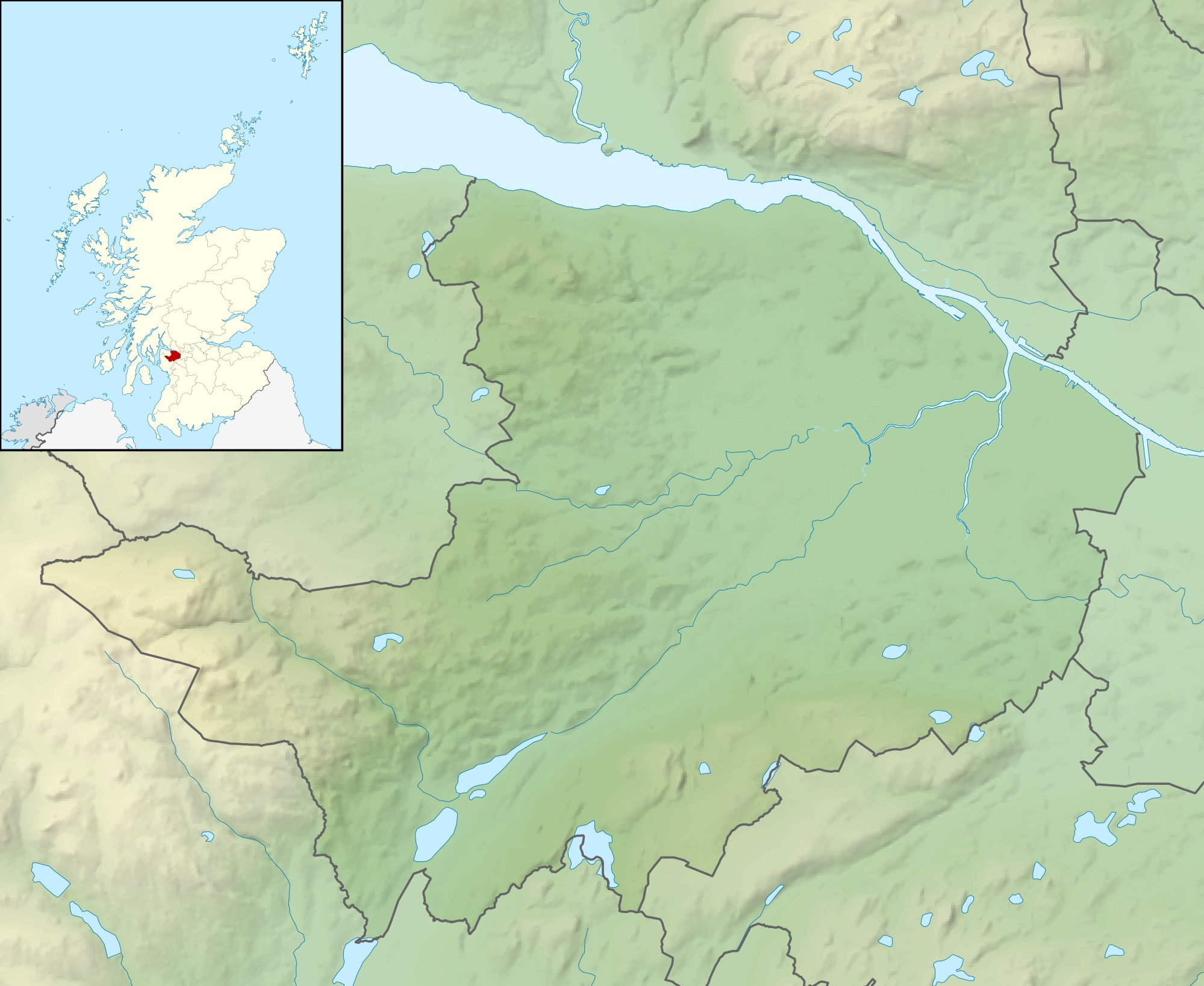
- Location in Renfrewshire Location in Scotland
- OS grid reference: NS513674
- Coordinates: 55.876°N 4.378°W

Physical geography
- Island group: Islands of the River Clyde

Administration
- Council area: Renfrewshire
- Country: Scotland
- Sovereign state: United Kingdom

Demographics
- Population: 0

King's Inch and the much smaller Sand Inch were islands lying in the estuarine waters of the River Clyde close to Renfrew in Renfrewshire, Scotland. Due to dredging and a change of the course of the main current of the River Clyde, silting, etc. it has become part of the southern, Renfrewshire side, of the river bank and is now built over.

Also recorded as 'The King's Inch' or simply 'Inch.' Walter fitz Alan built a second stone castle on a motte on the mainland in Renfrew itself and this became the principal messuage or manor place of the barony, the powerbase of the Fitz Alan's who were to become the Stewart line of monarchs. Both names relate to the Royal lands here held by King Robert II and later Stewart monarchs.

The name lives on in a street name, etc. and King's Inch railway station once served Renfrew from 1903 to 1926 on the Glasgow and Renfrew District Railway.

== Islands in the River Clyde ==
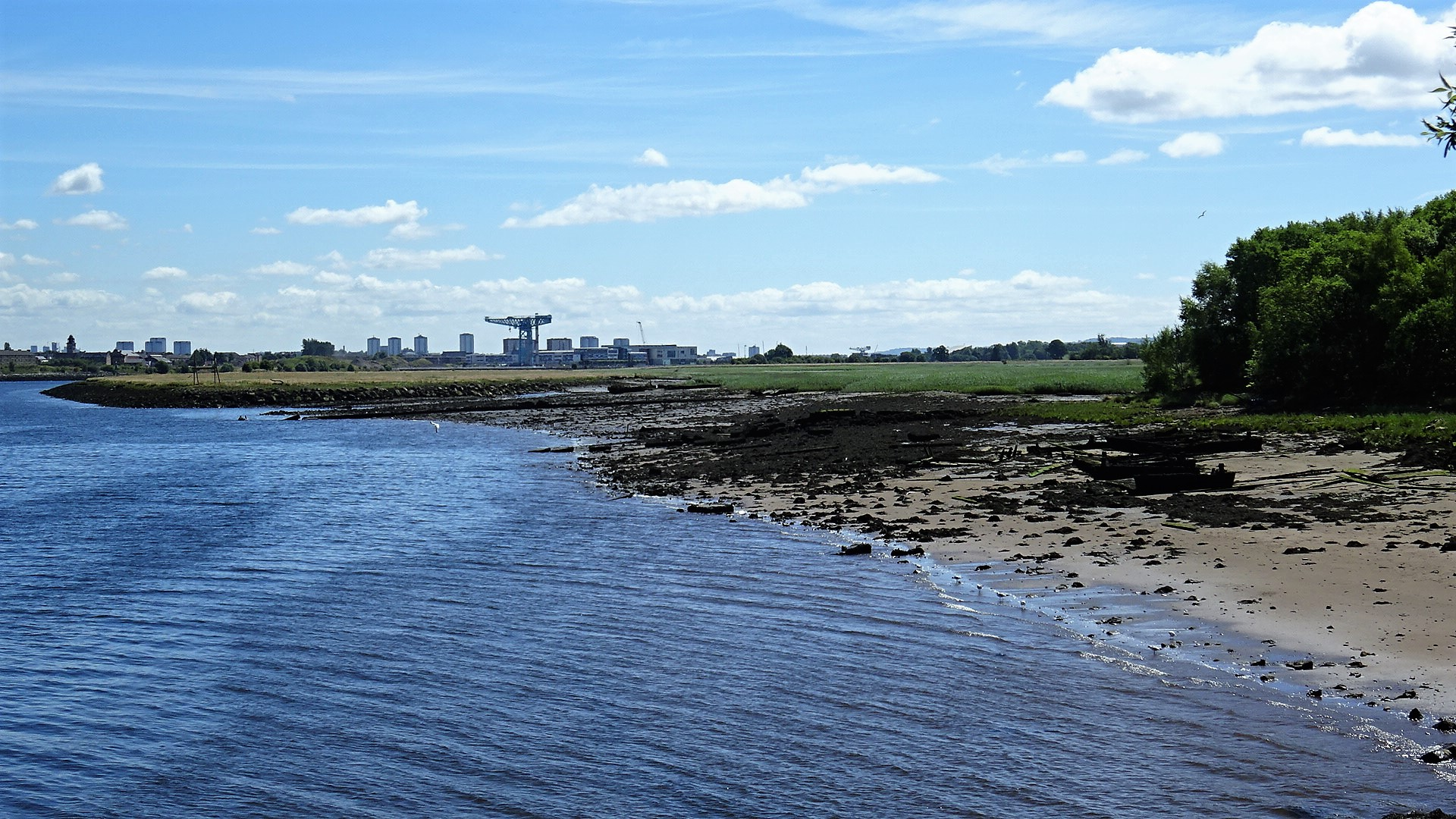
View up the Clyde from Newshot Island

Islands of the River Clyde, rather than sand or mud banks only exposed at low water, once included in order, working upstream towards Glasgow :- Milton, Bodinbo, Newshot, Ron, Sand Inch, Kings Inch, Buck Inch, White Inch and Water Inch. A Colin's Isle once sat in the waters of the Cart near its confluence with the River Clyde.

The name 'Inch' is Scots deriving from the Gaelic 'Innis', an island. The name 'Ron' in Scots refers to a thicket of hawthorns or rose briers, an area of stunted and crowded woodland. Buck Inch may translate as a place where the sound of pouring or gushing water was heard.

== Sand Inch ==
This was a small island lying downstream of the King's Inch. It remained as an island on Timothy Pont's map of the late 16th century. The later mid-17th century map by Robert Gordon does not record the island. No island is shown in 1745 on Herman Moll's map. Sand Inch has been incorporated into the river bank of the Clyde and into King's Inch. The island may have joined with King's Inch by the mid-17th century.

== King's Inch ==
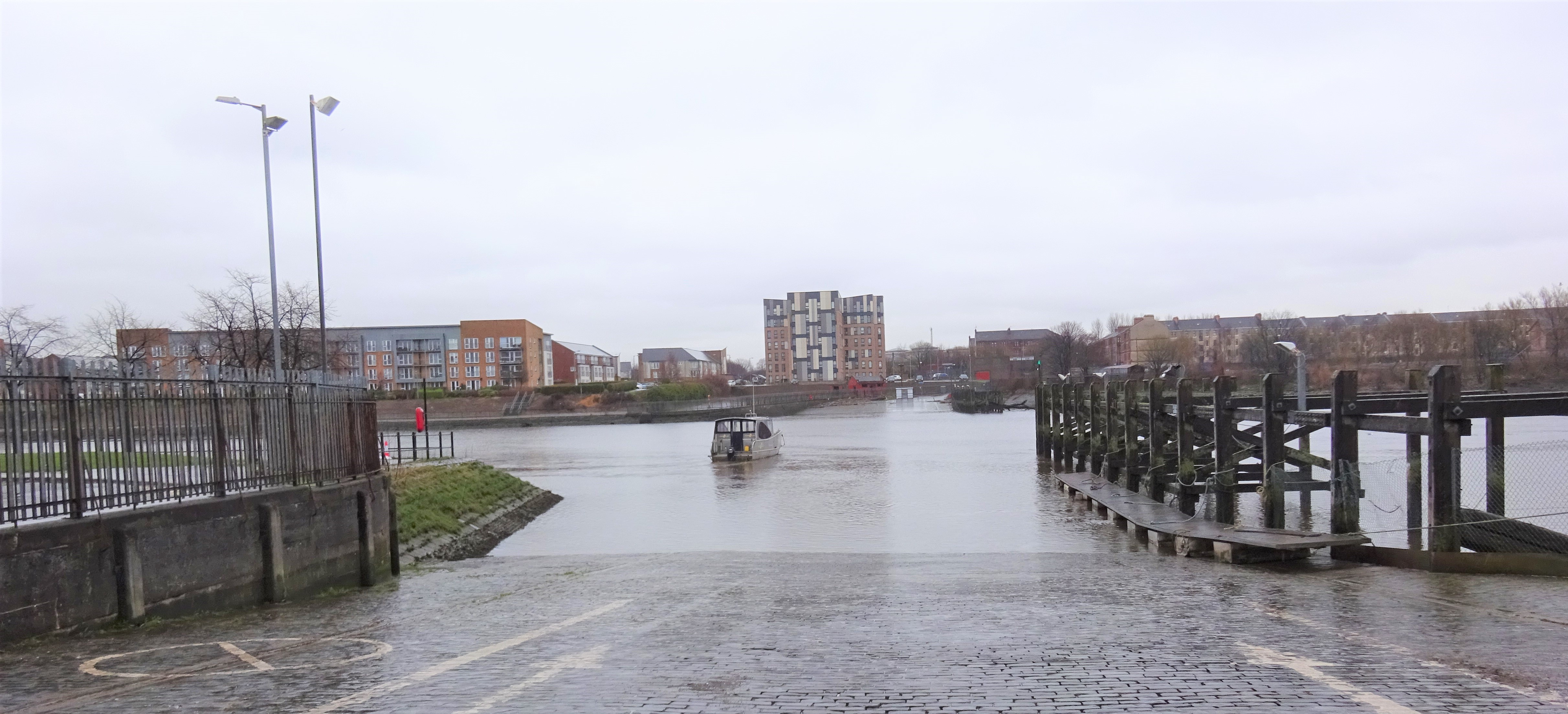
The Renfrew Ferry looking towards Yoker

King's Inch was a sizeable island off the river bank of the Clyde at Renfrew in the then Barony of Renfrew. It ceased to be an island at some point after the mid-eighteenth century. It may have joined with the islet of Sand Inch before it joined with the mainland and also joined with the islet of Buck Inch at some point that lay nearby upstream.

Originally the Renfrew Ferry service operated from King's Inch, 1/2 mile (800 m) further upstream on land which is now the site of the Braehead Shopping Centre at the Marlin Ford's location, but a move was agreed in 1778 to better serve the town of Renfrew and to prevent public access to the Elderslie Estate as the path ran through their land, with the Spier's family completing in 1791 the building the Ferry Road, the ferry house, quays and slipways, etc.

=== Castles ===
Walter fitz Alan (born c. 1110; died 1177), as High Steward of Scotland in the reign of David I (1124-1153), constructed the first castle here in the 12th century. It was probably mainly a wooden fortification with stone foundations on an earth motte surrounded by a flooded moat.

From this base Walter eventually established a power base which acted act as a buffer to protect David I's interests in this part of his kingdom. Somerled of the Isles and Fergus of Galloway had made an alliance in the reign of Malcolm IV and it was the Renfrew lands which were threatened with Somerled, King of the Isles, arriving in 1164 with 160 ships in the Firth of Clyde. The invasion fleet failed, and in battle somewhere near Renfrew, Somerled was killed.

The Castle at King's Inch was abandoned in the 13th century and replaced by a stone castle in what is now the centre of Renfrew.

In the latter half of the 15th century, Sir John Ross (died. c. 1474) was granted the 'Lands of Inch' with the ruins of this first castle and built Inch Castle, a three-storeyed stone fortification on the site of the old castle. In 1732 the last member of this Ross family died here. The castle was a small, L-shaped tower house with a stair turret in the re-entrant angle. It had been demolished by 1791. James IV made Sir John Ross the hereditary constable of the original castle.

==== King's Inch and Paisley Abbey ====
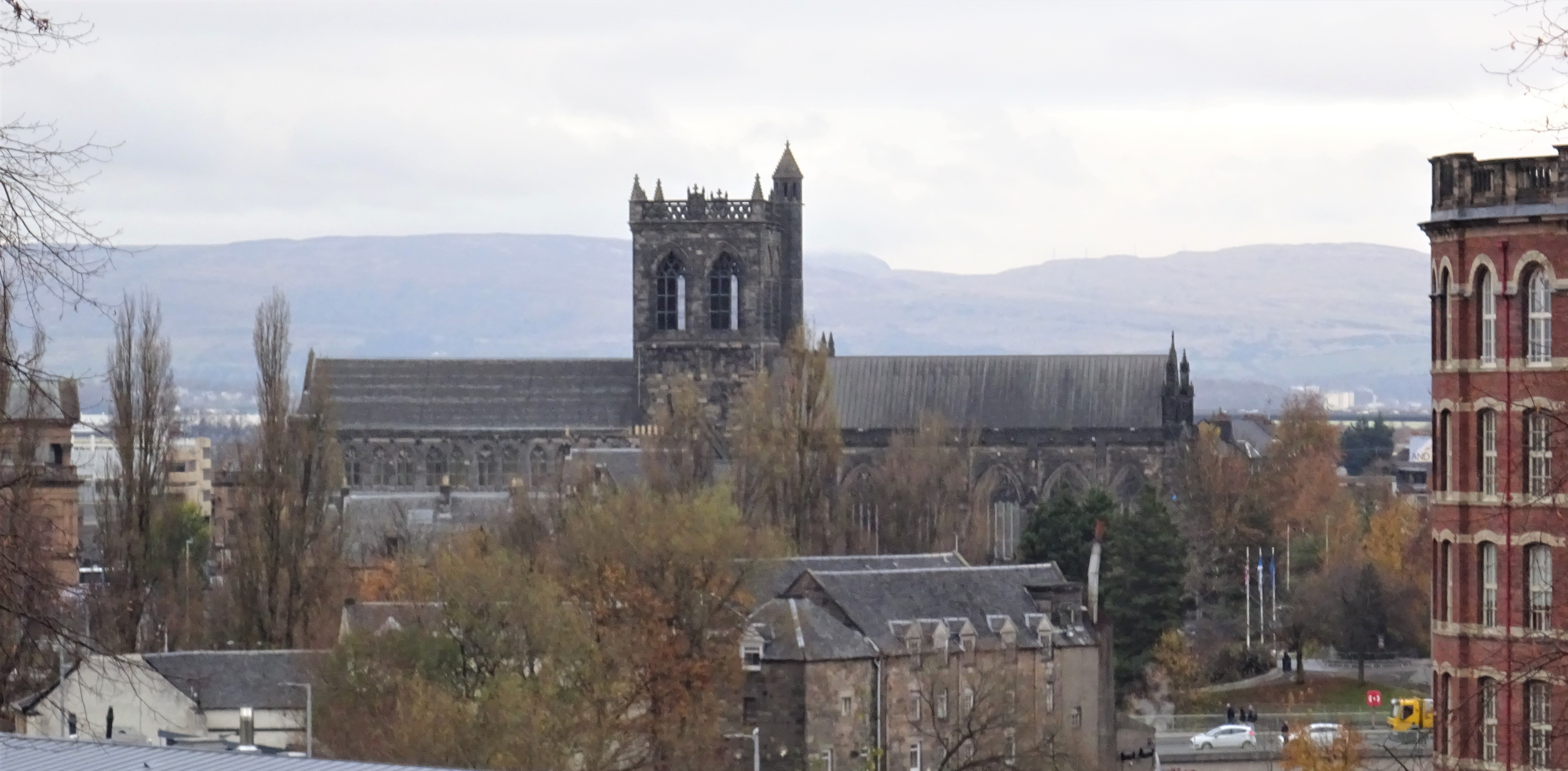
Paisley Abbey from near Blackhall

Thirteen monks from Much Wenlock arrived at Renfrew c. 1168 and were lodged at the Steward's castle on King's Inch at a church dedicated to Saints Mary and James. The accommodation at Paisley Abbey was not ready for them at the time. Osbert was appointed as the prior. The monks had fishing rights on the River Clyde. By the year 1172 the monks had moved to Paisley Abbey. Walter gave King's Inch and all the fishings on the Clyde between the island and Partick to the abbey.

The island was granted to Paisley Abbey and remained abbey property until 1208–1213, at which time the priory of Paisley excambied the island to Walter, the grandson of the first Steward in exchange for lands elsewhere. After the initial purpose of the castle was superseded and the monks were in residence it is likely to have been abandoned during this period.

==== Sir John Ross of Hawkhead ====
A story is recorded of how Sir John came to acquire King's Inch through a man to man contest at the Kempe Knowe near the Knock, how to the Knox family, near Paisley:

"The King of England, it is said, challenged Scotland to furnish a man able to fight a famous champion then in attendance on the English Court. The King of Scotland accepted the challenge, but was for some time unable to find a man equal to the task, and in his perplexity offered the Inch as a reward to any one who successfully encountered the Englishman. At last Sir John Ross of Hawkhead offered himself, and arrangements were made for the fight on the Knowe. The moat was filled with water, and a large fire kindled upon the mound. Neither party was expected to give quarter. To escape was to meet death by drowning, and to be vanquished was to perish, if not otherwise, by fire. The Englishman was of large stature; Ross was small but remarkably agile and of great strength. He dressed himself in a tight-fitting skin with the smooth side outwards, and in order to make it more slippery, rubbed it well with grease or oil. The Englishman was unable to get a grip of him, and at last held out his hands, inviting Ross to grasp them. The invitation was 'palm my arm.' This, it is said, is exactly what Ross wanted. He seized the Englishman by the wrists, and by a sudden jerk, wrenched his arms out of their sockets, and then made an end of him."

The King tried to go back on his pledge and offered Sir John land elsewhere; however, the champion offered to serve his sovereign at another time and he would make do with the Inch and its castle for now. He became known far and wide as "Palm-my-arm."

=== Elderslie House ===
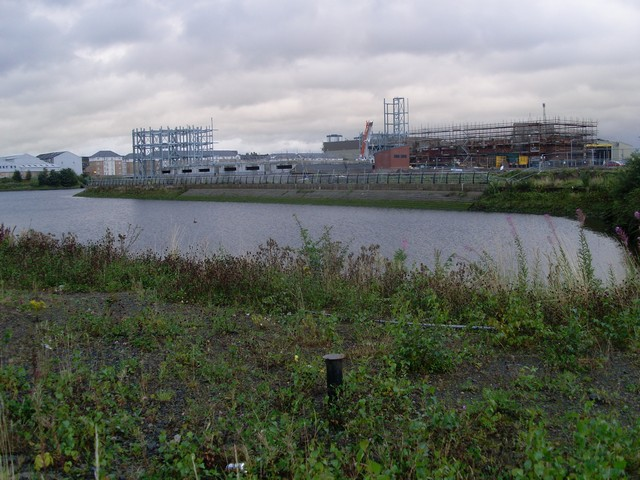
The old Renfrew Ferry basin

Mr Andrew Speirs of Elderslie (1714-1782), a Virginia merchant and Glasgow tobacco lord, purchased the lands in 1760 which together with other lands in Ayrshire became the Barony of Elderslie by Crown Charter in 1767.

Speirs is said to have demolished Inch Castle and constructed another castle, which he then had demolished only a few years later. It seems more likely that Speirs repaired Inch Castle before building Elderslie House in 1777 a little to the north and he incorporated some of the stone from the 15th century castle. It was designed by Robert Adam and was four storeys high with a pavilion roof and faced north. The lake, tree and shrub planting, etc. had been completed by 1782 and Andrew died shortly after. The 1856 OS map marks the site of the old castle lying to the south-west of the mansion house.

In 1775 a small mansion house is marked with the Pudzeoch Burn running to the Clyde nearby to the north. The 1800 John Ainslie and the 1826 John Thomson's map shows a substantial ornamental lake that was stocked with ornamental fish, lying to the south-east of the mansion house, partly on the line of the old river course, that is absent by 1859.

By 1859 the name King's Inch is still shown at the Elderslie Estate and its boundary from the Pudzeoch Burn at the Renfrew Ferry and upstream the Marlin Ford on the River Clyde delineate the lands of the old King's Inch. The Glasgow and Inchinan boundary line follows the same course at this point with the Braehead Estate on the Glasgow side.

Elderslie House (NS 5140 6762) was in turn demolished in 1924 after the death of the last occupant, William Peacock, a manufacturer of rope and cord in Paisley.

=== Braehead Power Station and Braehead Shopping Centre ===
After demolition the Elderslie Estates Company sold the site and in 1951 Braehead Power Station opened at a cost of £5 million as one of the first post-war power stations. In the early 1980s it had become time expired and was demolished. Housing schemes and the Braehead shopping and leisure complex were built on the old island's site. Nothing now remains of the castles or estate.

== The Course of the River Clyde ==
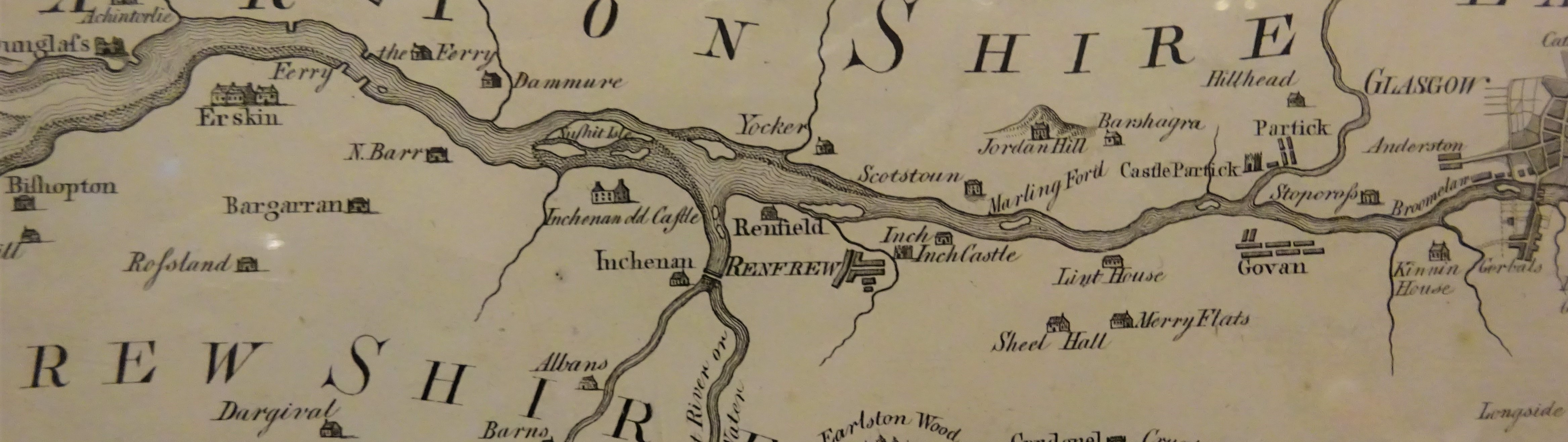
James Watt's 1736 survey of the River Clyde

The Clyde flooded in the 17th century and its course altered. The 'First Statistical Account' states that the river "left its usual course, nearly opposite to Scotstoun, took a semi-circular direction, leaving the King’s Inch on the north side, and running along the bottom of the garden belonging to the manse, came into its present direction". This shows that up to that time the River Clyde's main current flowed to the south of the Kings Inch, directly in front of the mainland Renfrew Castle, partly the line of the Pudzeoch Burn. The extensive dredging operations in the River Clyde in the 18th and 19th centuries resulted in the island finally becoming joined to the mainland.

Timothy Pont's map of the late 16th century shows the island with roughly equal width channels of the River Clyde either side. It is shown to be larger than the 3-hectare (7.4-acre) Newshot Island and a substantial castle is marked. The later mid-17th century map by Robert Gordon shows the same channel width and a castle of other significant building.

In 1745 Herman Moll's map shows the island with a minor channel on the south side and no buildings appear to be present. In the mid-18th century no buildings are indicated on William Roy's map; however, a minor channel still divides the island from the south bank. Ross's 1773 map marks Inch Castle and a short distance to the north-east an Inch House is recorded, indicating that the two co-existed for a time.

== See also ==
- Donald's Quay
- Milton Island
- Newshot Island
- Park Quay
- Rashielee Quay
- St Patrick's Rock
- White Inch
