= Birkenside, Scottish Borders =

Village in Berwickshire, Scotland

Coordinates: 55.67°N 02.70°W

Birkenside
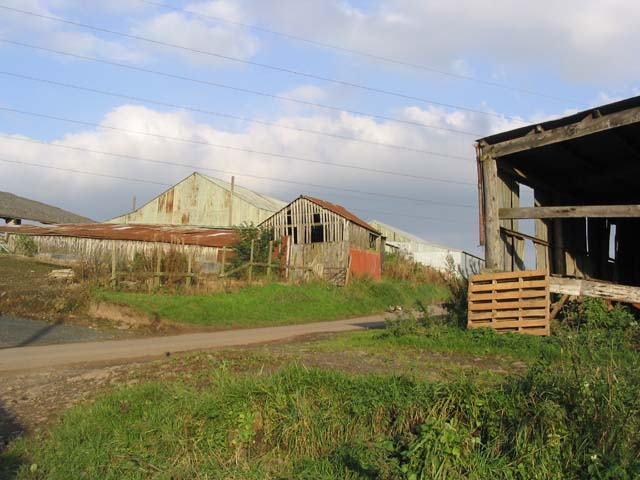
- Old buildings at Birkenside Farm

- Location within the Scottish Borders
- OS grid reference: NT5642
- Council area: Scottish Borders
- Country: Scotland
- Sovereign state: United Kingdom
- Post town: EARLSTON
- Postcode district: TD4
- Police: Scotland
- Fire: Scottish
- Ambulance: Scottish

Birkenside is a village in the Scottish Borders, Scotland.
