= Erskine Bridge =

Bridge over the River Clyde, Scotland

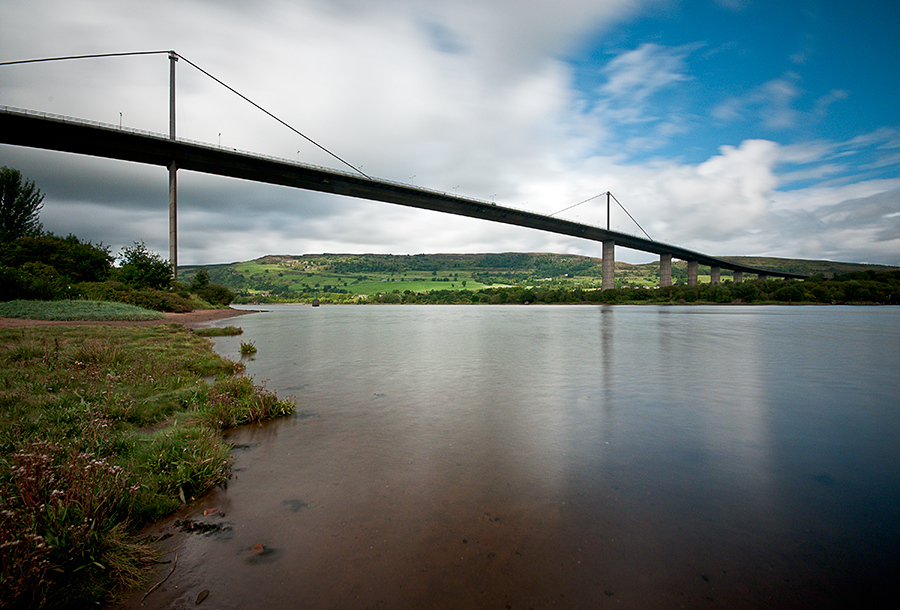
- View of the Erskine Bridge from the south bank of the River Clyde
- Coordinates: 55.9133°N 4.4721°W
- Carries: A898
- Crosses: River Clyde
- Locale: Renfrewshire
- Maintained by: Transport Scotland

Characteristics
- Design: Box girder
- Material: Steel, concrete
- Total length: 1,321.87 m (4,336.8 ft)
- Width: 31.25 m (102.5 ft)
- Height: 45 m (148 ft)
- Longest span: 305 m (1,001 ft)
- No. of spans: 15

History
- Designer: William Brown; R.E. Slater; Fairfields-Mabey; Freeman Fox & Partners; W.A.Fairhurst and Partners; Christiani & Nielsen; Lehane, Mackenzie and Shand Ltd
- Construction start: 1967
- Construction cost: £10.5 million
- Inaugurated: 2 July 1971
- Replaces: Erskine Ferry

Listed Building – Category A
- Official name: Erskine Bridge
- Designated: 21 November 2018
- Reference no.: LB52482

Location
- Interactive map of Erskine Bridge

The Erskine Bridge is a multi span cable-stayed box girder bridge spanning the River Clyde in west central Scotland. The bridge connects West Dunbartonshire with Renfrewshire and can be used by all types of motor vehicles, cyclists and pedestrians. As well as crossing the Clyde, the bridge also crosses the Forth and Clyde Canal and the North Clyde railway line. A small part of Kilpatrick railway station is situated underneath the bridge at the north side. The bridge is part of the A898 road. On completion the bridge replaced the Erskine to Old Kilpatrick ferry service.

== Construction ==
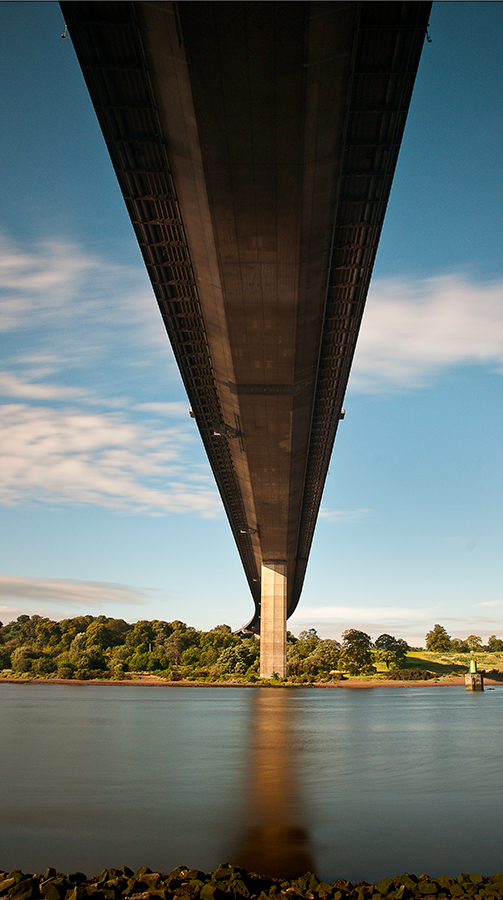
View of the underside of the bridge

The bridge was designed by William Brown (1928–2005), a structural engineer and bridge designer who specialised in suspension bridges. He was one of the principal designers at Freeman Fox & Partners (now Hyder Consulting) from 1956-85. Supervising engineer on the project was Oleg Kerensky and the architect on site was R.E. Slater. There were several firms who constructed the bridge between 1967-71. The structural engineering was done by Freeman Fox & Partners and the steel fabrication was completed by Fairfields-Mabey. W.A. Fairhurst and Partners (now Fairhurst) designed and oversaw construction of the concrete piers and foundations. Christiani & Nielsen, Lehane, Mackenzie and Shand Ltd were the contractors for the foundations and piers. The steel cable supplier was Bridon International. Force Technology were responsible for wind tunnel testing of the bridge.

Steel was used to construct the deck and pylons and the piers are made from concrete. The road surface is mastic asphalt and consists of a two-lane dual carriageway and cycle/footpaths on each side. It has a 305 m (1,001 ft) main span and two 110 m (360 ft) approach spans. The width of the road deck is 31.25 m (102.5 ft). Pylon height is 38 m (125 ft) high. The total length of the bridge including approaches is 1,321.87 m (4,336.8 ft). The clearance of the bridge is 45 m (148 ft). The weight of the steel is 11,700 tonnes. 1,250 miles (2,010 km) of galvanised wire with a breaking load of 500 tonnes were used during construction. The bridge has 15 spans in total and rests on 14 diamond shaped piers which have been designed to allow air to circulate freely around them. The deck and piers have been designed to flex with temperature changes. In the event of the bridge traffic numbers increasing the cycle tracks can be configured to include a third lane. There are 4 water mains pipes and 2 gas pipes running the full length of the underside of the bridge. It is the only bridge in Scotland with single cables over central main supports and was in this respect a precursor of the Millau Viaduct in France. At the time of building it was the longest bridge of its type in the world. The bridge cost, including approaches, was £10.5million(equivalent to £167,310,000 in 2025)..

Princess Anne opened the bridge on 2 July 1971. The ceremonial plaque of the opening can be seen on the railings of the western footpath, at the centre of the main span.

Whilst the bridge was being constructed, the West Gate Bridge in Australia also designed by Freeman Fox & Partners, collapsed. An investigation published on 14 July 1971 found faults in the design. The reason for collapse was a difference in camber between 2 girders on the west span. The Erskine Bridge had already opened but needed further stiffening to meet new standards established due to the collapse of the West Gate Bridge.

The bridge operates an overload weight detection system which logs vehicles axle weights. The weigh in motion system uses electric sensors and an ANPR camera. There is also a camera that takes photos of the vehicle from side-on which can identify the haulage company at fault. The system can also check if HGV axles are lifted when they should not be and is operational 24 hours a day. Reports can be printed for overweight vehicles.

== Geography ==
Map of the Erskine Bridge area

The bridge itself is the A898 road and its short approach from the south is the M898 motorway which is a spur from the M8 motorway. The bridge connects Erskine in Renfrewshire on the south side to the A82 (Great Western Road) at Old Kilpatrick in West Dunbartonshire on the northern side. The bridge is set at a high level to allow the passage of shipping beneath. This offers views of Erskine, Mar Hall, Erskine Hospital, Erskine Bridge Hotel, Dumbarton, River Clyde, Glasgow Airport and the Kilpatrick Hills. The area around the bridge has some historical significance as there have been various pieces of Roman artifacts found. Historical items found at the site include Roman coins known as sestertius and a crannog which is an artificial island. The bridge is the most downstream of all the Clyde bridges and is the last point at which the estuary can be crossed by road. Its main function is to divert traffic away from Glasgow and the urban stretches of the A82 which run through the city's West End and outer suburbs. The location of the bridge means that the bridge is used by tourist traffic from Glasgow International Airport bound for Loch Lomond and the north west Highlands.

== Toll bridge ==
Erskine Bridge Tolls Act 1968 (Note: Section 18(2).)
- Act of Parliament
- Parliament of the United Kingdom
- Long title: An Act to empower the Secretary of State to levy tolls in respect of the use of a new road which crosses the River Clyde at Erskine and of certain roads provided in connection therewith; to enable the Secretary of State to provide parking places in connection with those roads and, in relation to those roads, to impose prohibitions, restrictions and other requirements for the purpose of preventing obstruction and for the protection of property and otherwise; and for connected purposes.
- Citation: 1968 c. 4
- Territorial extent: United Kingdom

Dates
- Royal assent: 15 February 1968
- Commencement: 15 February 1968 (Note: The Acts of Parliament (Commencement) Act 1793.)
- Repealed: 11 February 2008 (Note: The Abolition of Bridge Tolls (Scotland) Act 2008 (Commencement) Order 2008 (SSI 2008/22).)
Other legislation
Amended by	Erskine Bridge Tolls Extension Order 1996; Scotland Act 1998 (Consequential Modifications) (No. 2) Order 1999; Erskine Bridge Tolls Act 2001; Public Finance and Accountability (Scotland) Act 2000 (Consequential Modifications) Order 2002
Repealed by	Abolition of Bridge Tolls (Scotland) Act 2008

Status: Repealed

Text of statute as originally enacted

Erskine Bridge Tolls Order 1992
- Statutory Instrument
- Parliament of the United Kingdom
- Citation: SI 1992/433

Dates
- Made: 2 March 1992
- Laid before Parliament: 11 March 1992
- Commencement: 1 April 1992 (Note: Article 1.)
- Revoked: 11 February 2008
Other legislation
Repeals/revokes	Erskine Bridge Tolls Order 1989
Made under	Erskine Bridge Tolls Act 1968
Revoked by	Abolition of Bridge Tolls (Scotland) Act 2008
Relates to	Erskine Bridge (Temporary Suspension of Tolls) Order 1999; Erskine Bridge (Temporary Suspension of Tolls) Order 2006

Status: Revoked

Text of statute as originally enacted

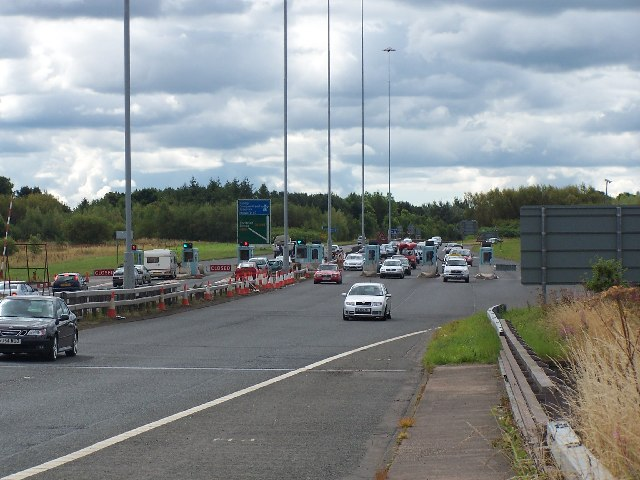
View of the toll booths at the bridge

The bridge was a toll bridge until 31 March 2006. Apcoa Parking UK Ltd collected tolls on the bridge from June 1992. The tolling booths were situated at the south side of the bridge and were constructed by Culford Art Metal. On 1 March 2006 the Transport Minister published a Tolls Suspension Order following an announcement that the tolling was to cease after 31 March 2006. The bridge had briefly been free of charge before - in 2001 an oversight caused the legislative order enforcing the toll to lapse and drivers crossed free until the new legislation was enforced. At this point the contract for toll collection was put out to tender and was re-awarded to Apcoa from 1 April 2002. The contract for toll collection expired on 31 March 2006. Toll charges from the beginning of the 1992-93 accounting period tolls had been a flat rate of 60p on all vehicles, except motorcycles and exempt categories. A discount of 10% was available to those purchasing 50 pre-paid crossing vouchers. Fire and police vehicles, ambulances, maintenance vehicles, and vehicles displaying disabled badges were exempt. The bridge was one of only three toll bridges left in Scotland when the tolls were abolished. The others were the Forth Road Bridge and the Tay Road Bridge. The tolls were abolished on those bridges on 11 February 2008. The bridge had collected £72 million in tolls by 2001 and collected £5.676m in the last operating year. Its current traffic levels are estimated at 35,000 vehicles per day and because of this the bridge was considered something of a white elephant given its elaborate design yet relatively low traffic levels compared to the congested Kingston Bridge further upstream. In the last accounting period between 1 April 2006 - 2 July 2006 whilst the tolls were free the bridge saw an increase in traffic on the previous year by 27.33%. The bridge is now part of the trunk road network of Scotland and is the responsibility of Transport Scotland.

== Events ==
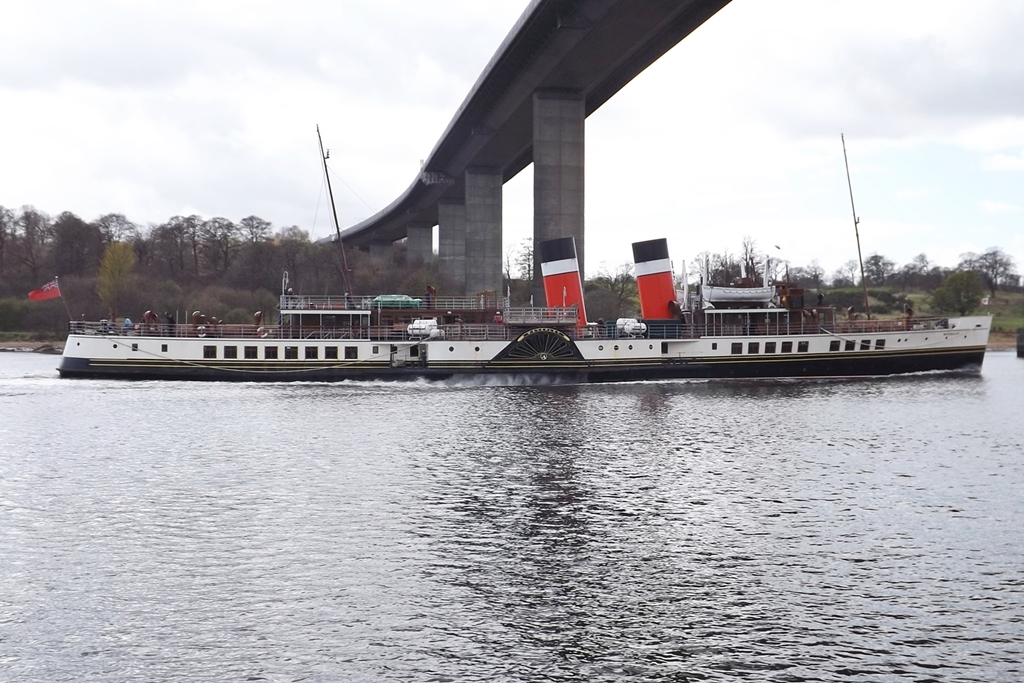
The Waverley paddle steamer sailing under the bridge

There have been two known births on the bridge. The first was a boy who was born 19 September 1990; he was subsequently named Oliver Erskine Edwards in homage to the bridge. A second baby, Kiera Sarah-Marie McFettridge was born in an ambulance on the bridge on 18 January 2011. The bridge has also been the subject of a murder investigation and ensuing court case after parts of a man's dismembered body were found underneath the bridge in late 2001. A man was subsequently arrested and convicted for this crime.

An oil rig called the Texaco Captain collided with the road deck on 4 August 1996 resulting in the closure of the bridge. The oil rig was constructed upstream at Clydebank before being towed down the River Clyde. The bridge reopened to pedestrians and cyclists on 22 August 1996. This was followed by cars and motorcycles on 30 August 1996 and was opened again to all vehicles including heavy goods vehicles on 22 December 1996. Repairs to the bridge cost £3.6 million with a further £700,000 in lost revenue from tolls.

The bridge has been used once by a group of base jumpers in August 2010. A Royal Navy Westland Sea King helicopter from HMS Gannet, coastguard teams and officers from Strathclyde Fire and Rescue Service were all called out to the bridge following the incident.

The bridge was designated a Category A listed structure in 2018 by Historic Environment Scotland, due to being "a state-of-the-art infrastructure landmark in Scotland for its time... recognised for its structural simplicity, economy of materials and slender appearance".

== Suicides ==
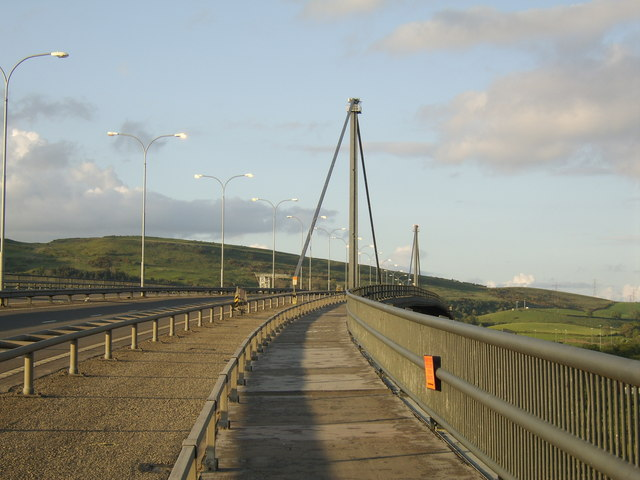
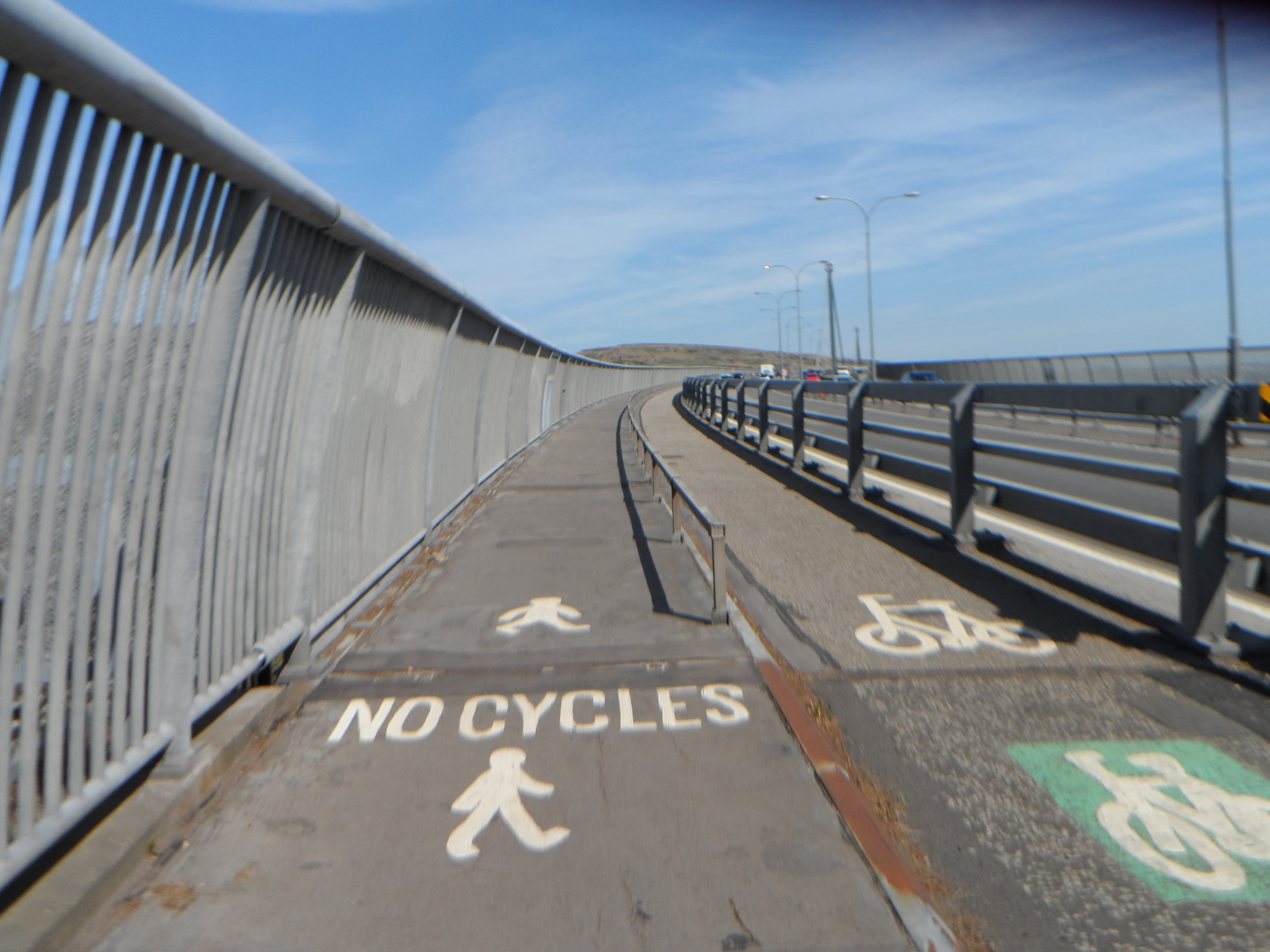
(Left) Barriers prior to upgrading (Right) Barriers after upgrading

The bridge is one of Scotland's most notorious suicide spots: estimates suggest that more than fifteen people commit suicide there each year. This has led to the Samaritans charity placing signs at each path leading onto the bridge and also within four public telephone boxes that are situated on the twin footpaths running adjacent to the roadway on either side of the river. There are also normal SOS phones as seen on motorways nationwide. The bridge was brought into the media spotlight again after the death of two teenage girls who absconded from a nearby secure unit. In September 2011, work started to install suicide barriers along the length of the bridge to prevent future suicide attempts. Installation of the new barriers was completed by Amey Highways at a cost of £3.5 million. The vehicle barriers are also being upgraded. The new barriers being installed are H4a High Containment Vehicle Barriers. These works will also see the towers and the suspension cables being re-painted. Stage one of this upgrade started on 15 July 2013 and is scheduled to last for 12 months. Highway Barrier Solutions are undertaking the upgrade which will cost £6 million and whilst ongoing the traffic is being monitored by Bluetooth technology. There are detectors on the bridge entry points which feed live traffic reports to the Traffic Scotland website.

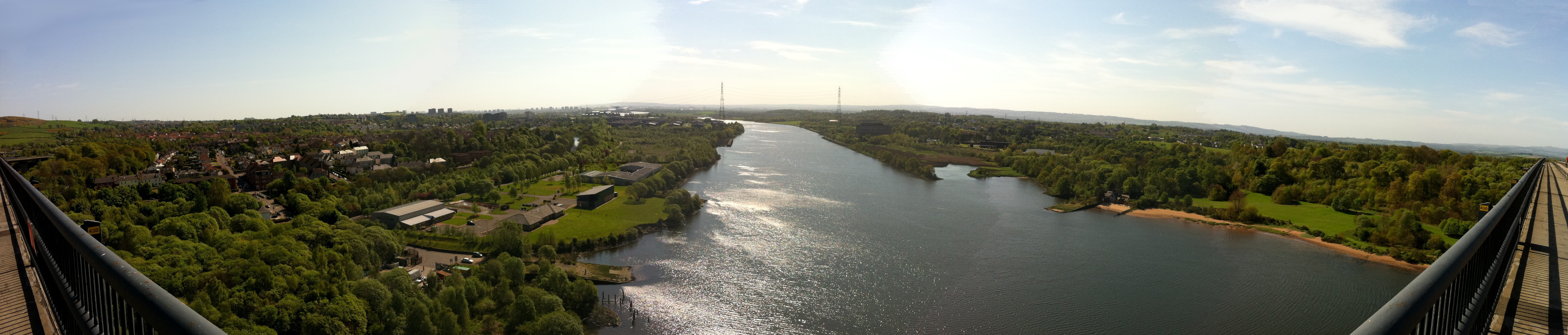
A panoramic view up river to Glasgow from the bridge

== See also ==
- List of places in West Dunbartonshire
- List of places in Renfrewshire
- List of longest cable-stayed bridge spans
- Transport in Scotland
- West Gate Bridge in Melbourne, Australia
