= Donald's Quay =

Coordinates: 55.925304°N 4.4683054°W

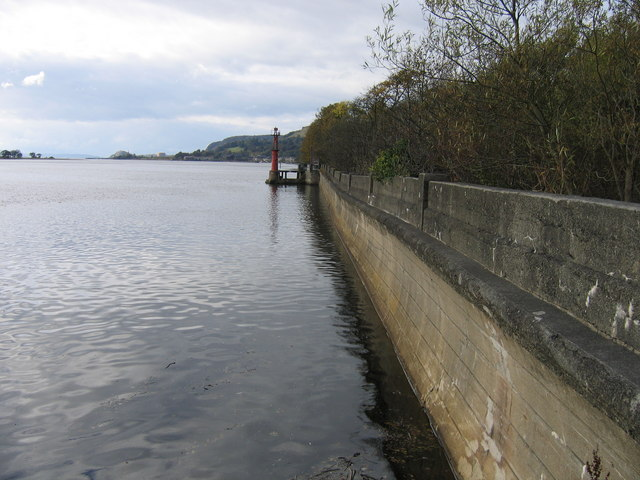
- Donald's Light at the site of the old quay

- Location within West Dunbartonshire
- OS grid reference: NS458730
- Civil parish: Old Kilpatrick
- Council area: West Dunbartonshire
- Lieutenancy area: Dunbartonshire
- Country: Scotland
- Sovereign state: United Kingdom
- Police: Scotland
- Fire: Scottish
- Ambulance: Scottish
- UK Parliament: West Dunbartonshire
- Scottish Parliament: Dumbarton

Donald's Quay was once the location of the northern terminus of the Erskine Ferry then run by Lord Blantyre of Erskine House that provided foot passengers with a crossing of the River Clyde, giving direct access between Dunbartonshire and Renfrewshire. At some point in the early 19th century the northern terminus of the Erskine Ferry moved to a site closer to Old Kilpatrick and opposite the Ferry House at Erskine, before closure in 1971 when the Erskine Bridge was completed. Donald's Quay once had an approximately 170-foot-long (52-metre) stone pier that was used by coal boats that transferred their loads into canal barges on the Forth & Clyde Canal at Ferrydyke Wharf and thereby avoided paying fees at the Bowling Basin. The quay was demolished during the construction of the Lanarkshire and Dumbartonshire Railway in 1896.

== Infrastructure ==
Roy's map of the mid 18th century marks the ferry as being in the Ferrydyke and Donald's Quay location without recording a name. Two sizeable buildings are shown amidst a group of trees; the canal is not marked as it was yet to be built. The Ferry House on the Erskine side is shown standing at the same location that it did when the ferry closed in 1971.

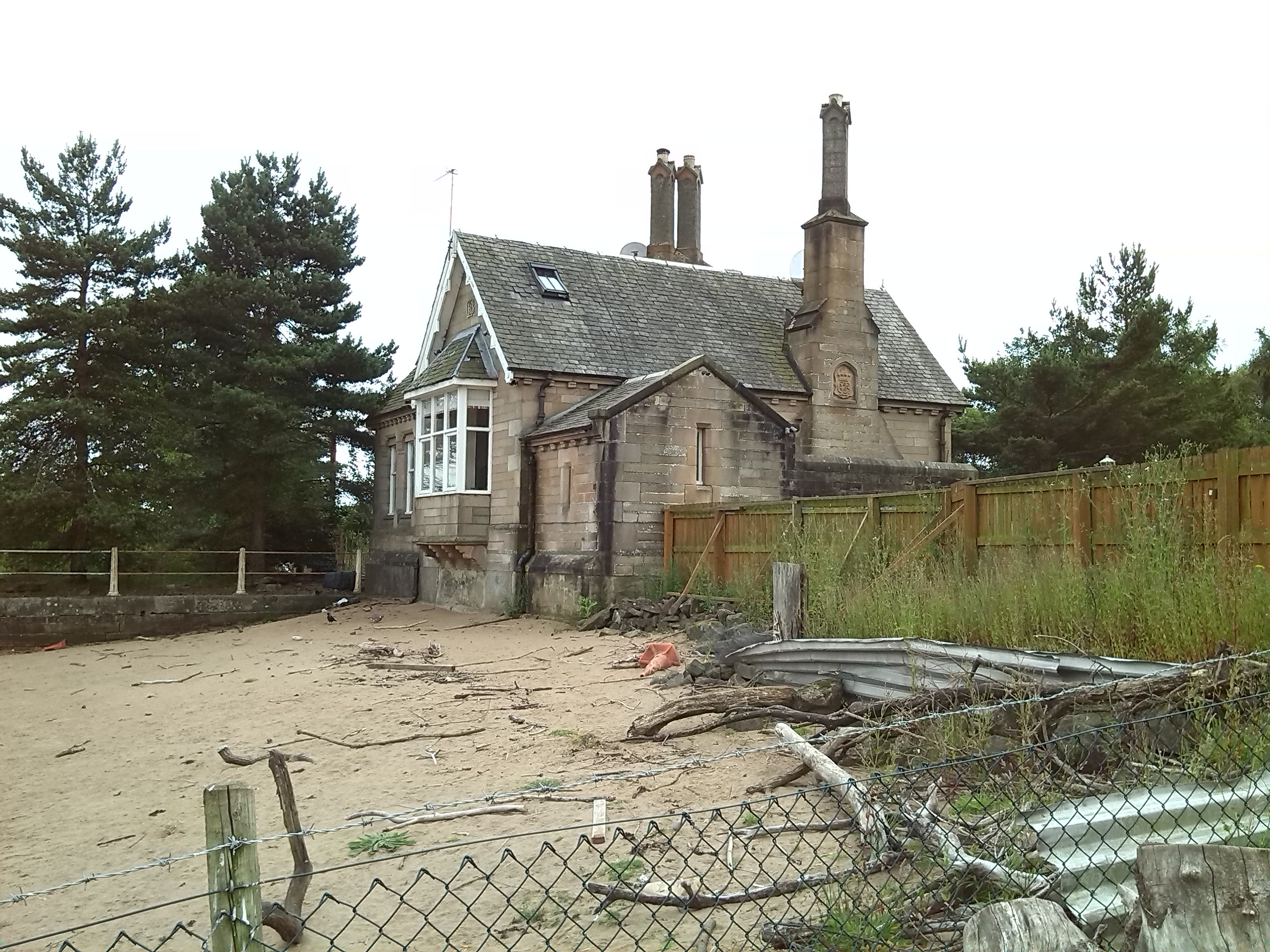
The old Ferry House near Erskine.

Thomas Telford planned to alter the Clyde until it was 490 feet (150 metres) wide at Donald's Quay. A light tower was installed at Donald's Quay in 1849. A photograph of it was displayed in St Louis in 1904. The 1860 OS map shows a dwelling at Ferrydyke on the northern side of the canal that may have been associated with the canal. On the southern side a complex of buildings is shown consisting of the stables and the bridge and stable keepers' cottages with a substantial stone quay running out from the river bank at right angles to it. The end of the approximately 170-foot-long (52-metre) quay is slightly wider than the midsection and it leads to a lane that accesses the stables area directly as well as running up to the Ferrydyke Wharf on the canal above. Donald's Quay reached the open river allowing boats to call at all stages of the tides. At this date the Lanarkshire and Dunbartonshire Railway had yet to be built. An enclosed area of land runs from the cottage/s a short distance to the east.

In 1896 the Lanarkshire and Dumbartonshire Railway opened its line between Old Kilpatrick and Bowling, West Dunbartonshire where it met with the Helensburgh line near Dumbarton East railway station. The 1896 25 inch to the mile OS map shows Donald's Quay Light (fixed red and white) standing on a very short stone pier that is approached via a substantial footbridge over the new railway. The cottages and stables are still present and roofed. The Ferrydyke cottage on the northern canal side is no longer shown.

In 1937 the stables complex and workers cottages are still present and a small extension has been added to one of them. The late 18th century Ferrydyke bascule bridge (NS458731) is one of the few remaining on the Forth & Clyde Canal and once carried the junction off the Old Portpatrick road to Donald's Quay, former site of the ferry to Erskine.

The ruins of canal bridge and stable keepers' cottages (NS4587073042) stand near the Ferrydyke bridge next to the old stables that lie below the canal.

== History ==
The quay was named for Robert Donald, 'Tobacco Lord' and Lord Provost of Glasgow who acquired the nearby Mountblow estate (NS 4798 7222) in 1767 and built a mansion house there. Robert came from an old established Dumbartonshire family.

The presence of a Roman fort nearby at Old Kilpatrick and the presence of a bath house at Ferrydyke has led to speculation that a harbour of some sort may have existed in the area to service the fort itself and the requirements of the Antonine Wall infrastructure. Bruce speculates that a ferry across the Clyde once existed here in Roman times.

By 1896 the quay had been demolished due to the construction of the Lanarkshire and Dumbartonshire Railway that reclaimed an area of the River Clyde shoreline here as well as building over the quay where it emerged from the land. The stables area was not effected by the railway and they remained in use providing horses to haul canal barges.

The name 'Ferrydyke' given to the site records the onetime presence of a ferry as well as suggesting that this quay may have been part of the large numbers of artificial dykes that were built in an effort to deepen the River Clyde to permit passage to Glasgow docks by larger ships. Another explanation of the use of the word 'dyke' is that the site stands close to the termination of Graham's Dyke which was another name used for the Antonine Wall. The small village of Ferry Dyke once existed here.

The River Clyde could be forded at nearby Dumbuck and a well formed 'made' route has been identified of possibly Roman origins. This crossing ceased to be passable once dredging etc. took place to deepen the channel.

== Workings details ==
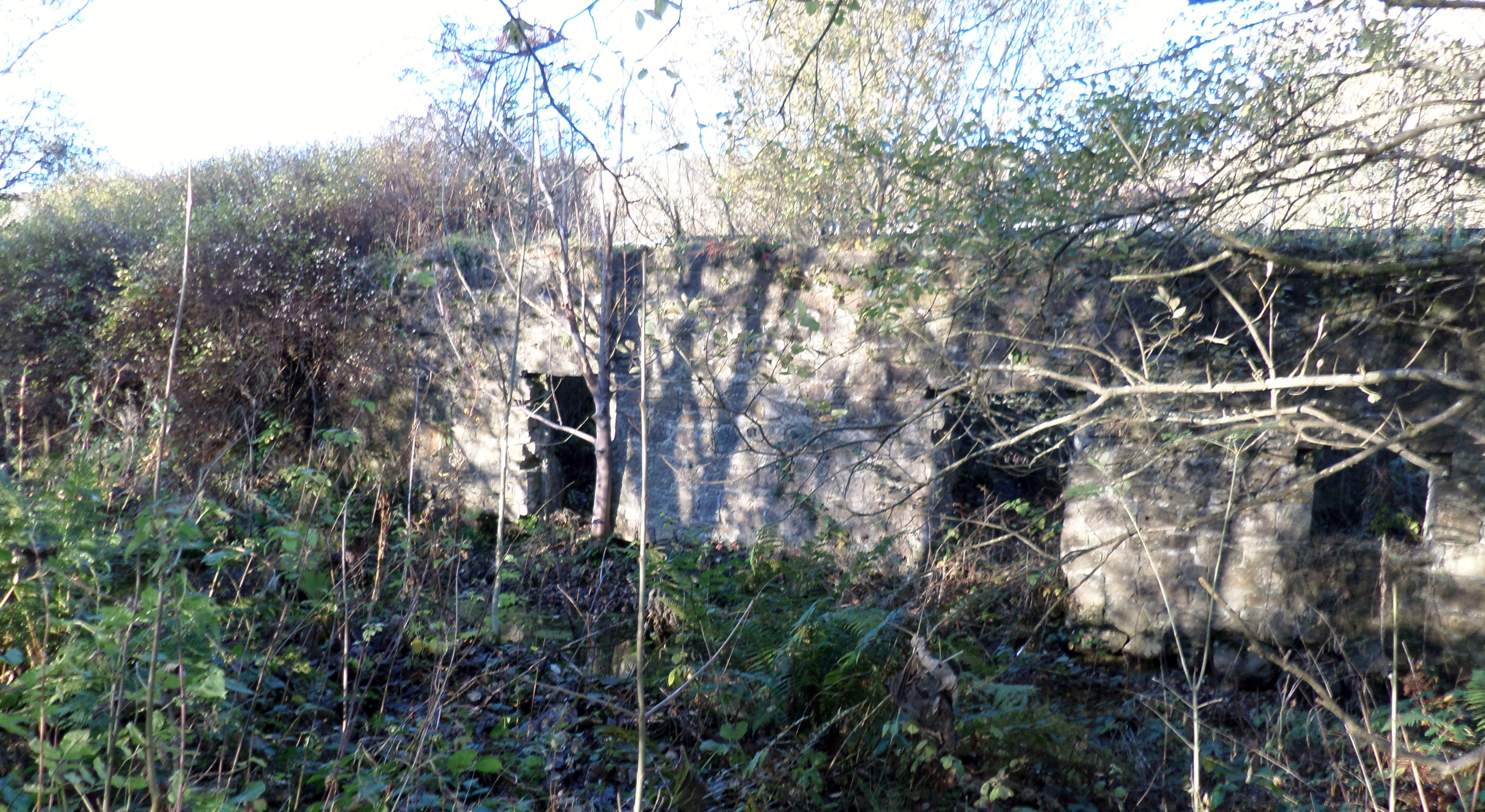
Part of the old stables complex.

The original Erskine Ferry ran from Donald's Quay to the Ferry House at Erskine on a route that made use of the tides to assist the ferry prior to a chain being laid and finally powered vessels being introduced at a different site further up river. By 1863 and probably somewhat earlier, Donald's Quay was no longer in use as a terminus for the Erskine Ferry. The location of the quay close to the canal would have allowed passengers carried on canal boats to easily access the ferry.

Bruce records that a sandbank formed in the 18th century that interfered with the passage of the ferry and forced its removal to its final location up river to the east of the Erskine Bridge.

The quay was used at one time for the unloading of coal that was then taken to barges waiting at the canal's Ferrydyke Wharf as this avoided the payment of fees at the Bowling Basin of the Forth & Clyde Canal.

The 1914 OS map shows for the first time a number of mooring posts running along the northern bank of the canal towards Lock 37 from Ferrydyke bascule bridge that were still present in 1937.

The stables below Ferrydyke Bridge are of an unusual construction having a 'walled garden' style outward appearance with a large entrance door in keeping with that analogy. Internally some brickwork of a later date survives and to the west stands a building that is more typically stables-like. The variety of buildings present suggest other uses throughout their working life than purely stabling for horses.

== The site today ==
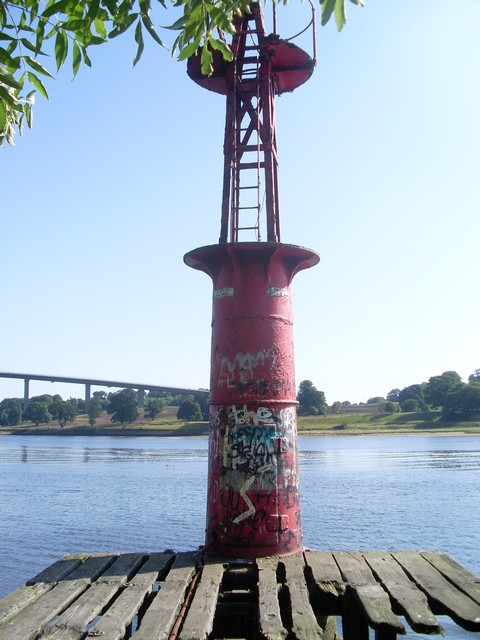
Donald's Quay Light

Donald's Quay Light now stands at the approximate site of the end of Donald's Quay and is still in use as a navigation aid for shipping using the River Clyde. The old stables and associated cottages are in a ruinous condition although substantial remains are extant. Two large stone pillars represent the remnants of the footbridge that the railway built to provide access to the Donald's Quay Light. The railway track has been lifted however the sea wall is still present and remains in good condition.

== Micro-history ==
A distance Slab of the Twentieth Legion was found at Ferrydyke at some point before 1684 marking the western termination of the Antonine Wall. A second distance slab was found here in 1758 and excavations have shown that a Roman bath house associated with the nearby Old Kilpatrick Roman fort also once stood at Ferrydyke. It has been suggested that a port serving the fort may once existed in the Old Kilpatrick area.

== See also ==
- Bodinbo Island
- Park Quay
- Rashielee Quay
- St Patrick's Rock
