= Abolition of Bridge Tolls (Scotland) Act 2008 =

Act of the Scottish Parliament

- Act of the Scottish Parliament
- Scottish Parliament
- Long title: An Act of the Scottish Parliament to abolish tolls on road bridges; and for connected purposes.
- Citation: 2008 asp 1
- Territorial extent: Scotland

Dates
- Royal assent: 24 January 2008
Other legislation
Repeals/revokes	Erskine Bridge Tolls Act 1968; Erskine Bridge Tolls Act 2001; Erskine Bridge Regulations 1989; Erskine Bridge Tolls Order 1992; Tay Road Bridge (Revision of Tolls) Order 1995; Forth Road Bridge (Revision of Tolls) Order 2005; Forth Road Bridge (Toll Period) Extension Order 2006; Erskine Bridge (Temporary Suspension of Tolls) Order 2006

Status: Current legislation

Text of statute as originally enacted

Text of the Abolition of Bridge Tolls (Scotland) Act 2008 as in force today (including any amendments) within the United Kingdom, from legislation.gov.uk.

The Abolition of Bridge Tolls (Scotland) Act 2008 (asp 1) is an act of the Scottish Parliament passed to abolish tolls on all road bridges in Scotland. In practice, it removed the remaining tolls on the Forth Road Bridge and the Tay Road Bridge and repealed legislation relating to the Erskine Bridge.

== Background ==
Tolls on the Skye Bridge had been controversial since its opening, and these were abolished in 2004.

The bill was a fulfilment of the commitment in the SNP manifesto for the May 2007 election to remove the tolls on the Forth and Tay road bridges. Leaving the two road bridges into and out of Fife as the only remaining toll bridges in Scotland was described as "unacceptable and unfair". The provisions of the bill removed this anomaly, making the entire road network in Scotland "consistent and fair".

At the time the legislation was passed, the cost of the tolls amounted to £1 on the Forth Bridge and £0.80 on the Tay Bridge.

== Passage through Parliament ==
The bill was introduced as an Executive Bill by John Swinney MSP on 3 September 2007. The Abolition of Bridge Tolls (Scotland) Act 2008 was passed by the Scottish Parliament on 7 December 2007. The act was given royal assent on 24 January 2008.

== Implementation ==
Tolls were removed from the bridges by 11 February 2008.

== Further developments ==
Transport Scotland has suggested that tolls could be reintroduced in order to reduce emissions.

== See also ==
- List of acts of the Scottish Parliament from 1999
- Erskine Bridge Tolls Act 2001
