= Erskine Ferry =

Ferry service

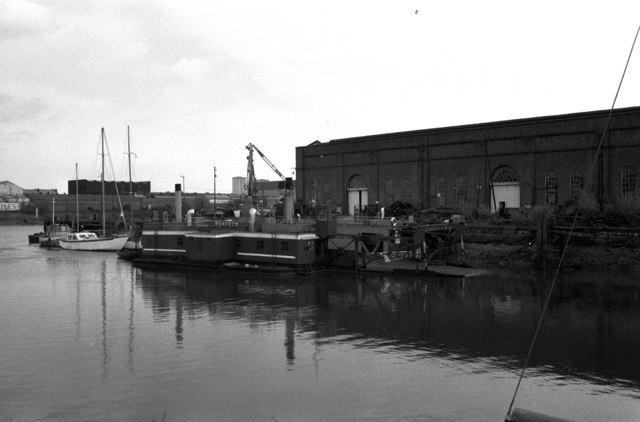
- Native name: East Ferry of Erskine
- Industry: Transportation
- Predecessor: River ford
- Founded: 1777
- Defunct: 1971
- Fate: Defunct
- Successor: Erskine Bridge
- Area served: Renfrewshire, Dunbartonshire
- Services: Ferries
- Owner: Clyde Navigation Trust

Erskine Ferry sailed across the River Clyde from Erskine to Old Kilpatrick. The ferry was also referred to as East Ferry of Erskine as there was another ferry to Dumbarton a few miles down river, known as West Ferry. It is reputed to be the oldest ferry crossing of the Clyde. The crossing was part of the A740 route from Paisley to Old Kilpatrick. It was established in 1777 and replaced by the Erskine Bridge in 1971.

== History ==
At Erskine, the Clyde was shallow enough to ford on foot and had been used for this purpose in past centuries. The river was then dredged to allow large ships to sail upriver to Glasgow. This brought a requirement of a ferry service between Erskine and Old Kilpatrick. Initially, a passenger-only service was available. The Clyde Navigation Trust acquired the service in 1907 and added a vehicle ferry boat to the crossing. The previous owner was the 12th Lord Blantyre.

== Boats ==
There have been many different types of boats used throughout the years. Initially a punt pushed along by poles was used prior to 1832. From 1832 to 1860 a chain ferry replaced the punt; ferry operators pulled on chains to cross the river. A steam-powered ferry was then used until closure.

Between 1856 and 1857, Thomas Wingate constructed the first steam-powered ferry called Urania. It was used until the early 1900s. In February 1903, the Paisley and Renfrewshire Gazette newspaper reported on an order placed with Messrs John Reid and Co shipbuilders for a new ferry steamer for the crossing. A third ferry was launched on 16 July 1935, built by Messrs Fleming and Ferguson. The former Renfrew ferry was upgraded in 1962 and served until the new Erskine Bridge opened in 1971.

== Service ==
The service ran from 6am to 10 or 11pm in the summer. During the winter months and on Sundays the service started at 10am. The fare in 1937 was 9d for a car and driver; this had increased to 2s by 1963. The journey over the Clyde took less than 5 minutes. At one point, connecting ferries from Greenock and Glasgow stopped at Erskine Ferry on an hourly basis. A Paisley holiday in March 1912 saw 251 cycles, 75 motor cars and 2,073 foot passengers cross on the ferry.

== Accidents ==
On 18 June 1963, an accident killing two ex-servicemen visiting the Erskine Hospital occurred at the ferry. The driver of a motor vehicle put his foot on the accelerator instead of the brake, this resulted in the car smashing through the safety barriers on the ferry and into the Clyde, killing the driver and passenger. The two men and car were recovered from the Clyde. One of the men is buried in Erskine, just outside the hospital grounds.

A bus full of passengers also crashed through the barriers on 26 July 1946. The vehicle was pulled back on to the ferry and nobody was injured.

A man was rescued from the Clyde on 18 January 1953 by the ferry-master. He had cycled down the slipway at Old Kilpatrick and missed the boat, resulting in him ending up in the water.

== Ferry Lodge ==
Ferry Lodge is a category B listed building used by the ferry operators. The ticket office for foot passengers was on the Old Kilpatrick side: passengers from Old Kilpatrick went through a turnstile to the right of the office (looking towards the ferry), those coming from the Erskine side passed through a turnstile to the left. Renfrewshire Council sold the building in 1983. Ferry Lodge, which is now a house, was designed by Sir Robert Smirke, the architect of the British Museum. There was also an inn nearby. This building is no longer here.

== Gallery ==
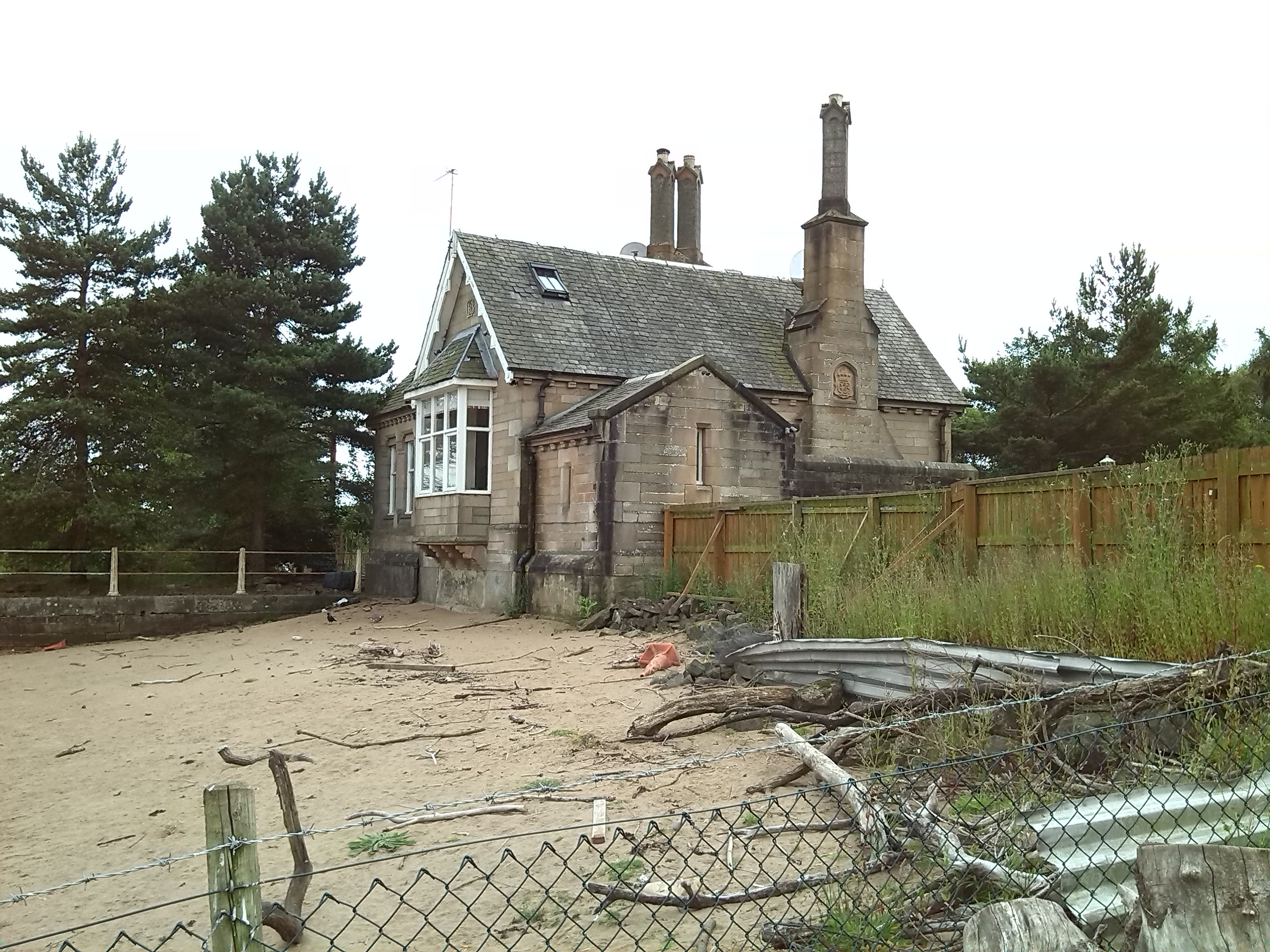
Ferry Lodge

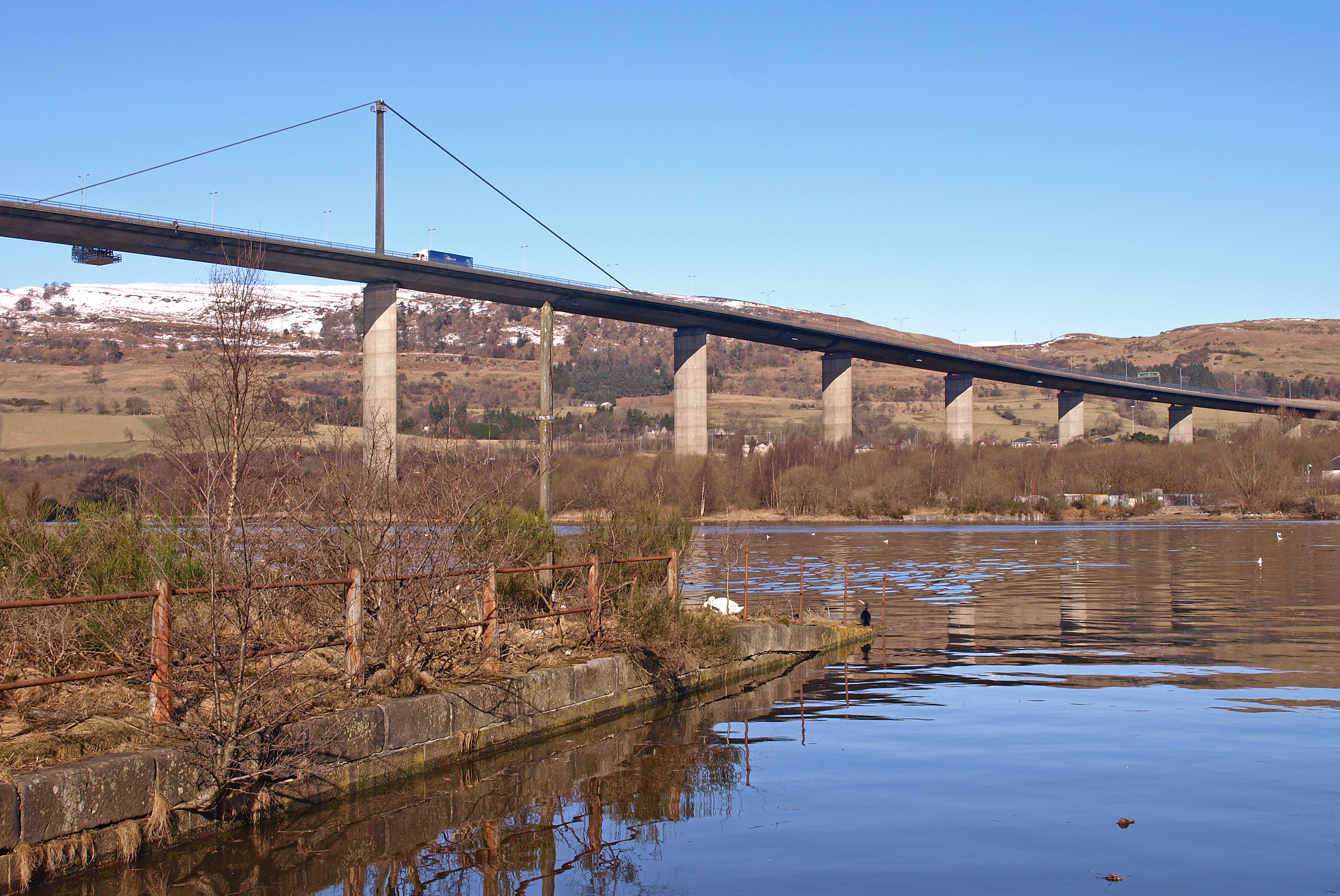
Disused ferry slipway

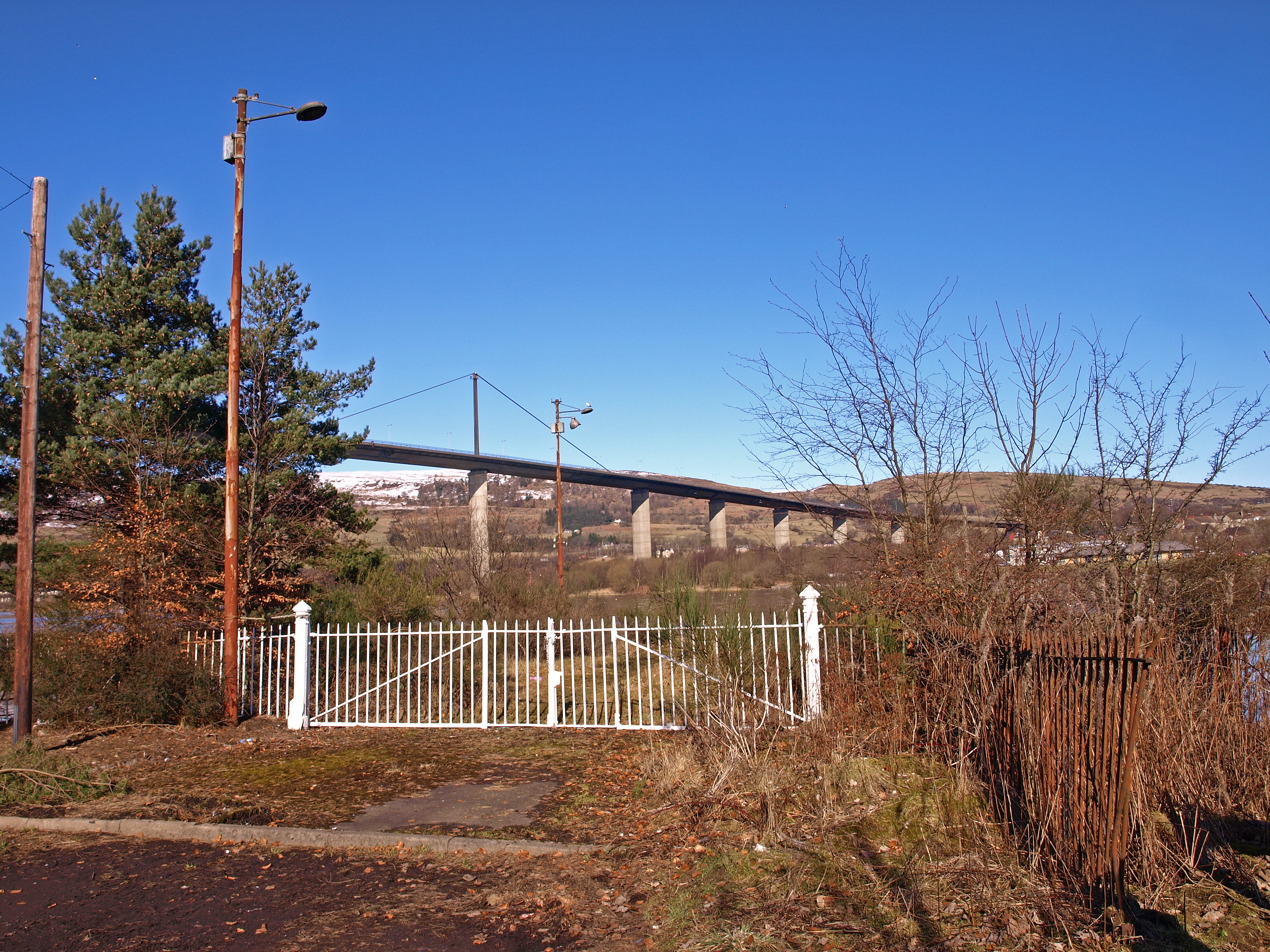
Entrance gates to slipway

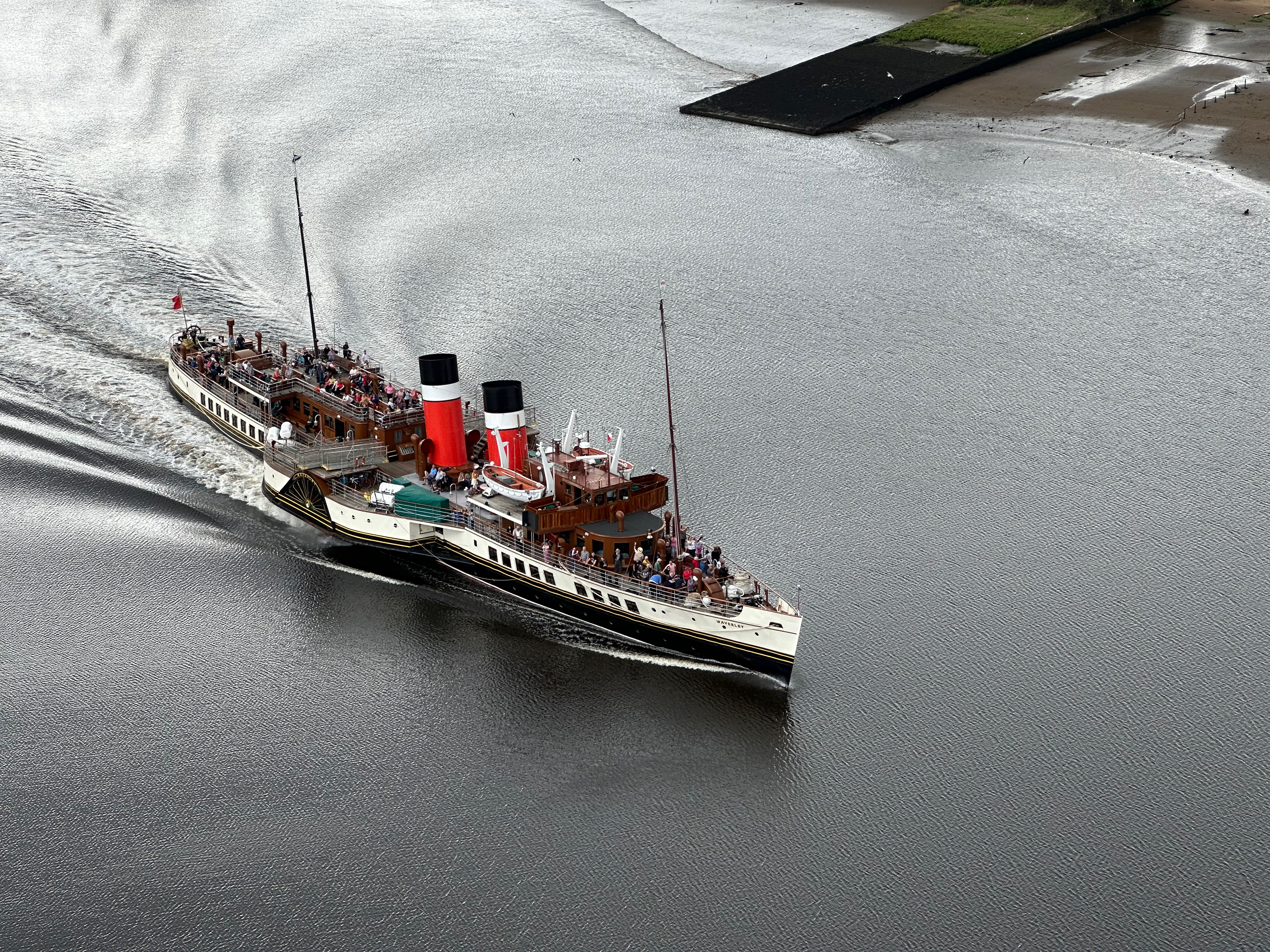
Slipway seen from the bridge

== See also ==
- Bodinbo Island – an island close to the old ferry site
- Donald's Quay – Site of the original Erskine Ferry
