= Erskine Bridge Tolls Act 2001 =

Act of the Scottish Parliament

- Act of the Scottish Parliament
- Scottish Parliament
- Long title: An Act of the Scottish Parliament to restore, with retrospective effect (other than as regards criminal liability), the power to levy tolls conferred by section 1(1) of the Erskine Bridge Tolls Act 1968; and for connected purposes.
- Citation: 2001 asp 12

Dates
- Royal assent: 13 September 2001
- Commencement: 2 July 2001
Other legislation
Repealed by	Abolition of Bridge Tolls (Scotland) Act 2008
Relates to	Erskine Bridge Tolls Act 1968; Erskine Bridge Tolls Order 1992

Status: Repealed

Text of statute as originally enacted

The Erskine Bridge Tolls Act 2001 (asp 12) was an act of the Scottish Parliament which restored, with retrospective effect (other than as regards criminal liability), the power to levy tolls. This power was originally conferred by section 1(1) of the UK Parliament's Erskine Bridge Tolls Act 1968.

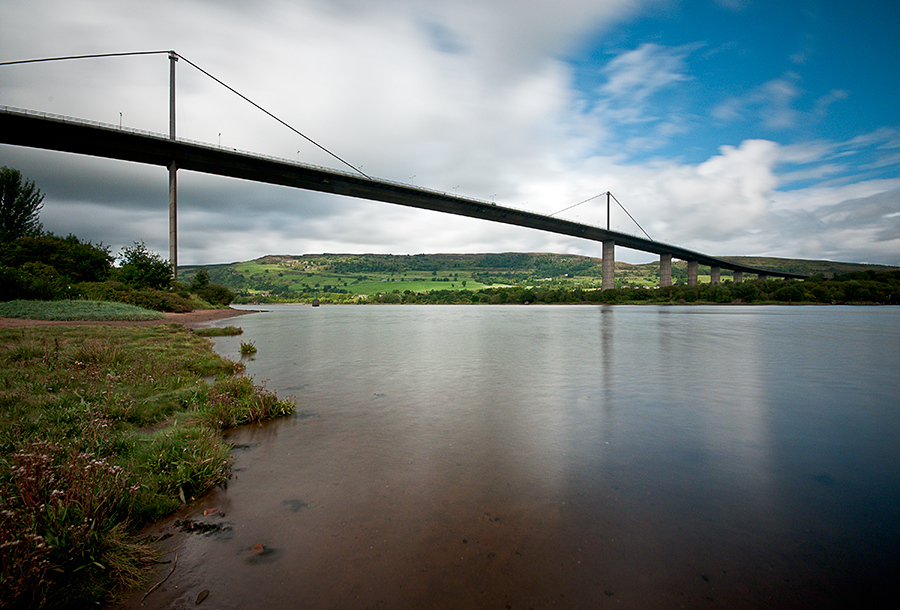
Erskine Bridge

== Background ==
Toll charges on the Erskine Bridge were suspended in August 2001, after the Scottish Executive discovered it had been collecting money illegally for several weeks following a failure to extend the legislation which allowed designated officials to collect money for the crossing over the River Clyde near Glasgow.

The Scottish Executive had approved the extension of the toll, but had not laid the regulations before the Scottish Parliament.

== Passage through Parliament ==
A few weeks later, the Erskine Bridge Tolls Act 2001 was passed by the Scottish Parliament by 78 votes to 26, with no abstentions. The Scottish National Party fought the bill during its day-long passage through the Scottish Parliament, arguing that it was being rushed through without proper consultation. Adam Ingram, the SNP transport spokesman, insisted that the use of emergency procedures meant the public and the local authorities, such as West Dunbartonshire and Renfrewshire councils, were being denied the right to object. The bill was given royal assent on 13 September 2001.

== Subsequent legislation ==
Following phase II of the Scottish Executive's Tolled Bridges Review, the act was effectively set aside by the formal ministerial suspension of tolls in 2006. The remaining provisions of the 1968 act were superseded by the Abolition of Bridge Tolls (Scotland) Act 2008 (asp 1).

== See also ==
- List of acts of the Scottish Parliament from 1999
