= Windy Hill, Renfrewshire =

Hill in Scotland

Windy Hill
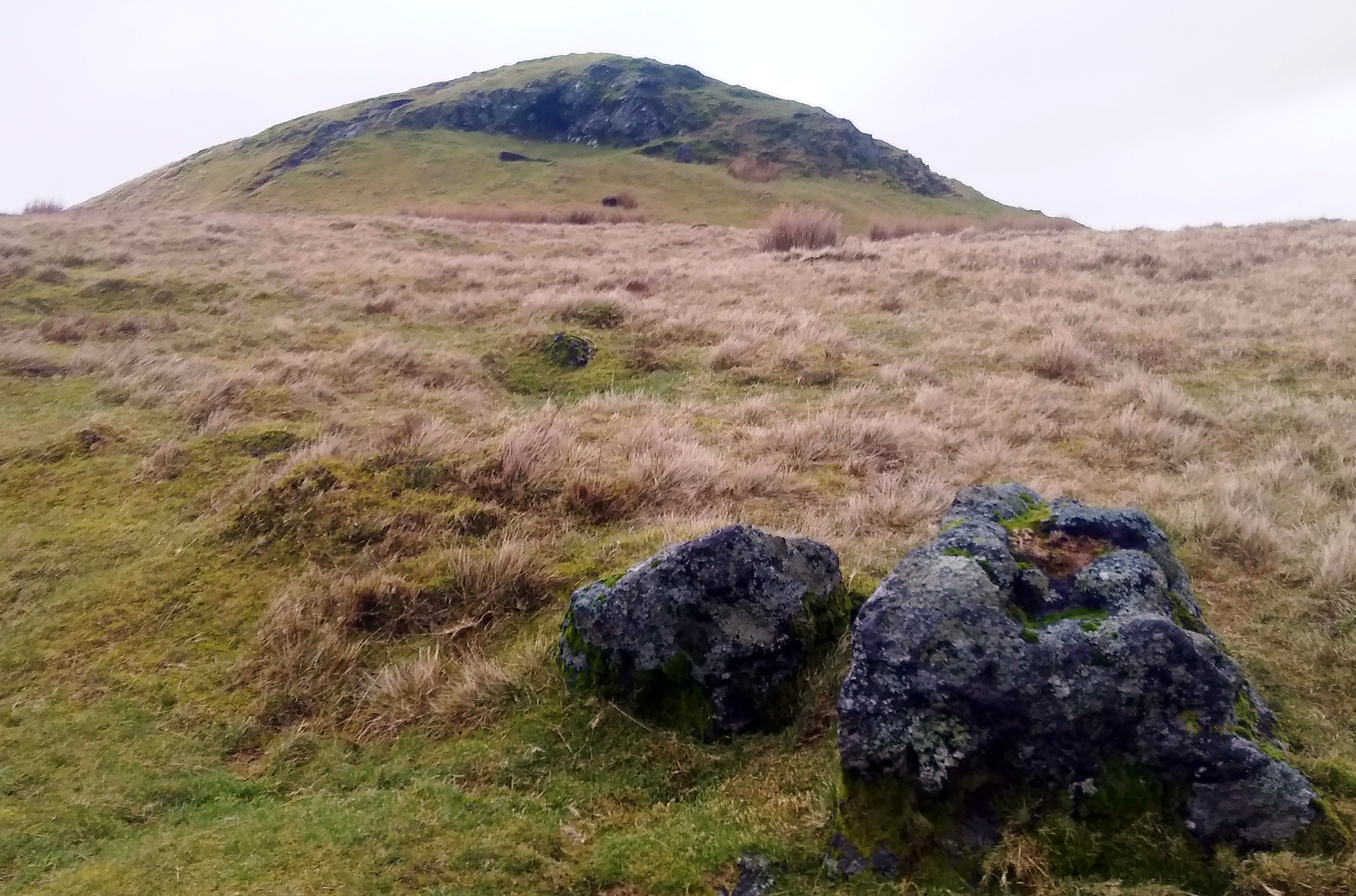

Highest point
- Elevation: 316 m (1,037 ft)
- Prominence: 52
- Listing: TuMP
- Coordinates: 55.83748°N 4.68676°W

Geography
- Location within Scotland
- Location: Renfrewshire, Scotland
- OS grid: NS 3183 6374
- Topo map: OS Landranger 63

Geology
- Rock type: Igneous rocks

Climbing
- Easiest route: Hike

Windy Hill is a 316 metres (1.037 feet) high hill in Renfrewshire, Scotland. It is one of the TuMPs of the Lowlands.

== Geography ==
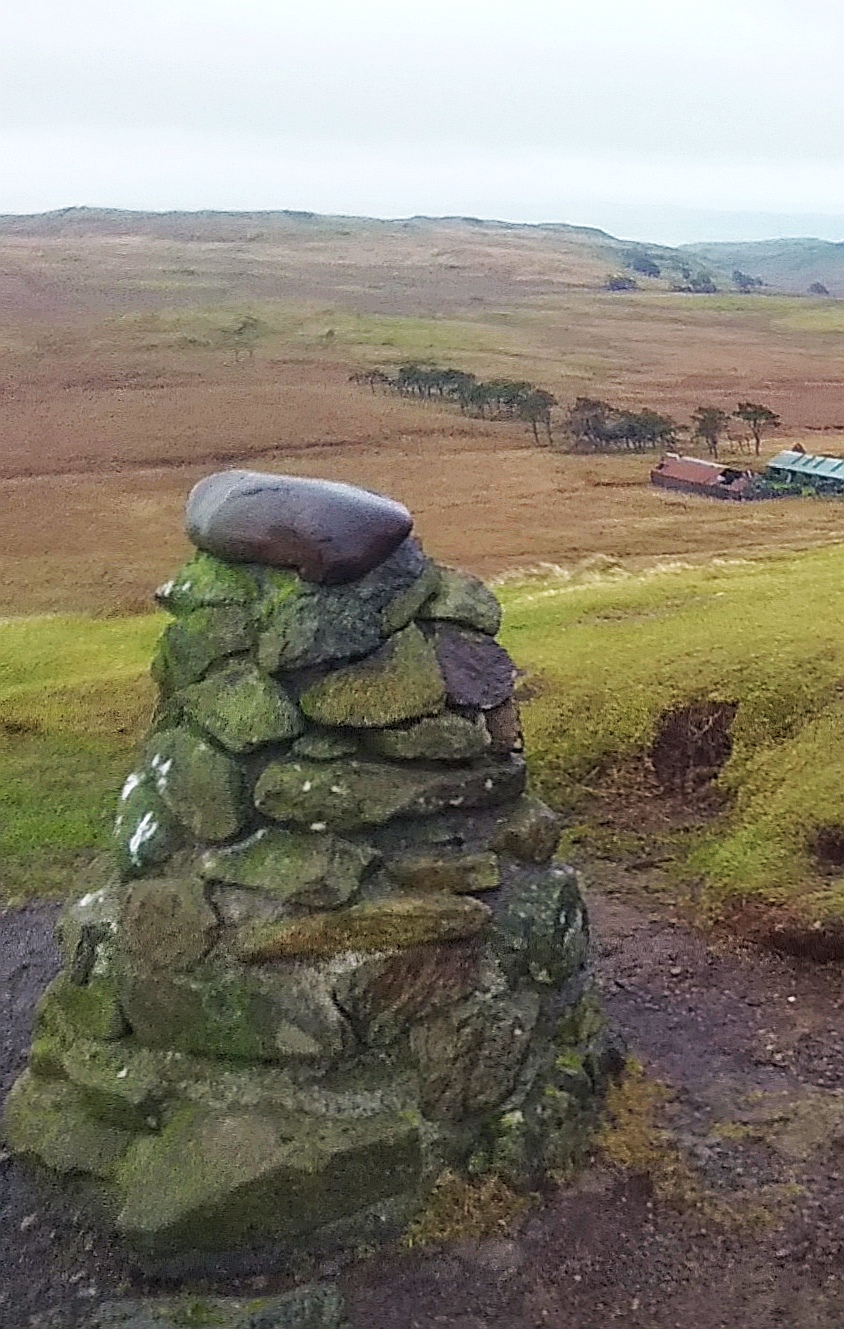
Summit cairn

The hill is located on the eastern border of the River Calder catchment area and is part of the Clyde Muirshiel Regional Park. Its summit is at OS grid ref NS 3183 6374. Windy Hill is also the name of the first important house designed by Charles Rennie Mackintosh, which is located in Kilmacolm at some miles from the hill.

== Geology ==
The hill is what remains of the top of a volcanic plug. A little east from Windy Hill can be observed a well developed bole horizon (more than 2 metres thick), a type of soil which originates from the weathering of igneous rocks.

== Access to the summit ==
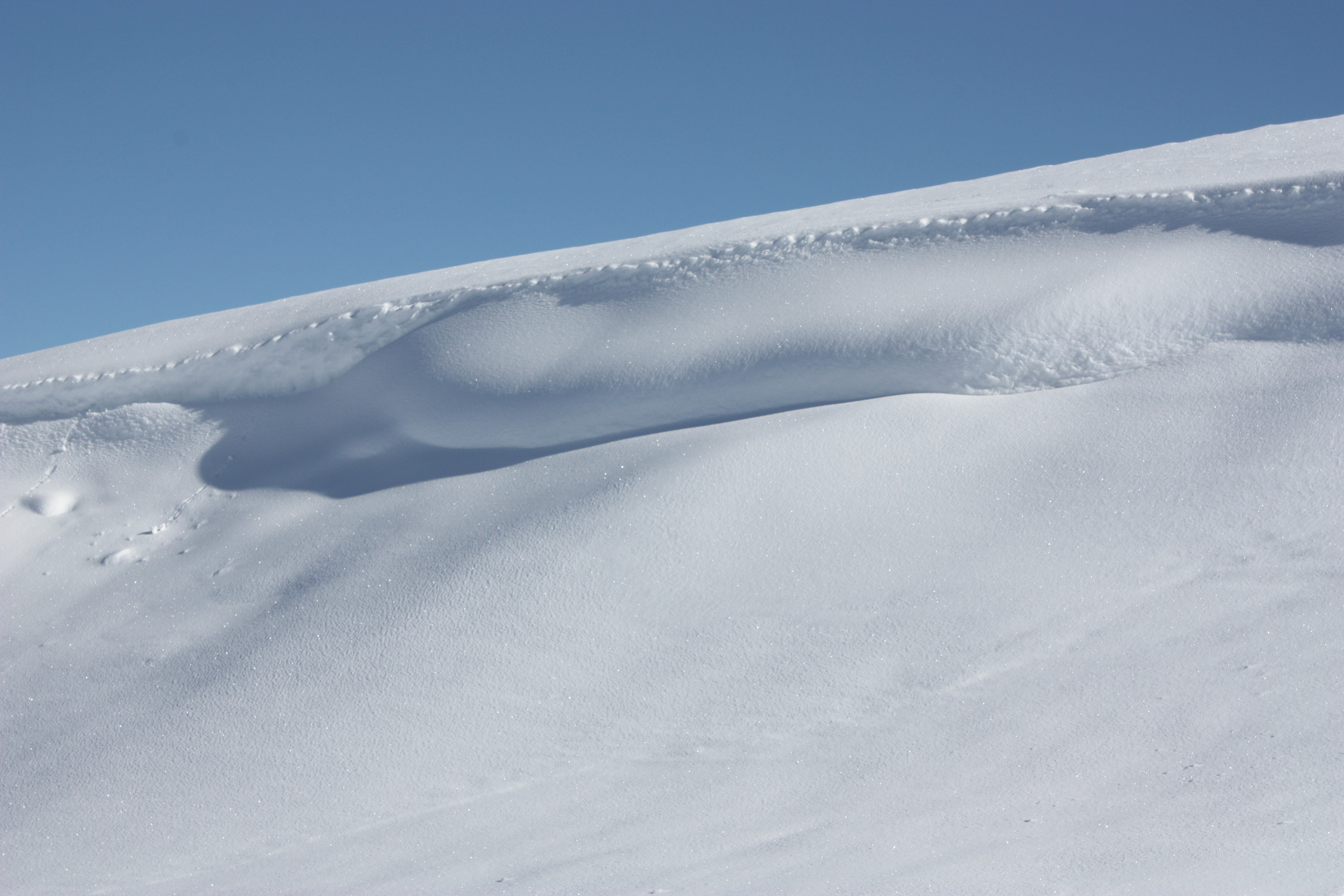
Windy Hill in winter

The hilltop can be easily accessed from the visitor centre of Muirshiel, following a maintained footpath, and offers a good point of view on the surrounding area. The walk is considered ideal for children too.

== See also ==
- List of mountains in Scotland
- List of places in Renfrewshire
