= Fairhurst =

Fairhurst is an English habitational surname, and may refer to a now vanished hamlet near Parbold in Lancashire. The name is derived from Old English fæger (meaning beautiful) with hyrst (wooded hill).

== People ==
- Angus Fairhurst (1966–2008), English artist working in installation, photography and video
- Billy Fairhurst (1902–1979), English football player
- David Fairhurst (1906–1972), English football player
- Dick Fairhurst (1911–?), English football player
- Ed Fairhurst (born 1979), Canadian rugby player
- Fiona Fairhurst, English textile designer; inventor of the Speedo Fastskin swimsuit
- Frank Fairhurst (1892–1953), English politician
- Harry S. Fairhurst (1868–1945), British architect
- Horace Fairhurst (1893–1921), English footballer
- Liam Fairhurst (1995–2009), British charity fundraiser
- Mary Fairhurst (1957–2021), American lawyer
- Sue Fairhurst (born 1974), English-born Australian softball player
- Susan Sutherland Isaacs (née Fairhurst; 1885–1948), British psychologist
- Theodore Fairhurst (born 1947), Canadian artist, entrepreneur and mountain climber
- Waide Fairhurst (born 1989), English footballer
- William Fairhurst (?–2018), British and New Zealand chess master and bridge designer

== Company ==
- Fairhurst (company), a British engineering consultancy
