= List of Scottish statutory instruments, 2008 =

This is a complete list of Scottish statutory instruments in 2008.

== 1-100 ==
- The Individual Learning Account (Scotland) Amendment Regulations 2008 (S.S.I. 2008 No. 1)
- The Public Service Vehicles (Traffic Regulation Conditions) Amendment (Scotland) Regulations 2008 (S.S.I. 2008 No. 2)
- The Local Authorities' Traffic Orders (Procedure) (Scotland) Amendment Regulations 2008 (S.S.I. 2008 No. 3)
- The School Crossing Patrol Sign (Scotland) Regulations 2008 (S.S.I. 2008 No. 4)
- The Bankruptcy Fees (Scotland) Amendment Regulations 2008 (S.S.I. 2008 No. 5)
- The Police Act 1997 (Criminal Records) (Scotland) Amendment Regulations 2008 (S.S.I. 2008 No. 6)
- The Criminal Procedure (Scotland) Act 1995 Compensation Offer (Maximum Amount) Order 2008 (S.S.I. 2008 No. 7)
- The Discontinuance of Legalised Police Cells (Scotland) Rules 2008 (S.S.I. 2008 No. 8)
- Act of Sederunt (Summary Applications, Statutory Applications and Appeals etc. Rules) Amendment (Licensing (Scotland) Act 2005) 2008 (S.S.I. 2008 No. 9)
- The Shrimp Fishing Nets (Scotland) Amendment Order 2008 (S.S.I. 2008 No. 10)
- The Bluetongue (Scotland) Order 2008 (S.S.I. 2008 No. 11)
- The Condensed Milk and Dried Milk (Scotland) Amendment Regulations 2008 (S.S.I. 2008 No. 12)
- The National Assistance (Assessment of Resources) Amendment (Scotland) Regulations 2008 (S.S.I. 2008 No. 13)
- The National Assistance (Sums for Personal Requirements) (Scotland) Regulations 2008 (S.S.I. 2008 No. 14)
- The Transport (Scotland) Act 2005 (Commencement No. 4) Order 2008 (S.S.I. 2008 No. 15 (C. 1))
- The Scottish Road Works Register (Prescribed Fees and Amounts) Regulations 2008 (S.S.I. 2008 No. 16)
- The Conservation (Natural Habitats, &c.) Amendment (Scotland) Regulations 2008 (S.S.I. 2008 No. 17)
- The A92/A972 Trunk Road (Cadham Road and Car Wash Facility) (Prohibition of Specified Turns) Order 2008 (S.S.I. 2008 No. 18)
- The Annual Close Time (Permitted Periods of Fishing) (River Dee (Aberdeenshire) Salmon Fishery District) Order 2008 (S.S.I. 2008 No. 19)
- The Police Grant (Variation) (Scotland) Order 2008 (S.S.I. 2008 No. 20)
- The Management of Offenders etc. (Scotland) Act 2005 (Commencement No. 4) Order 2008 (S.S.I. 2008 No. 21 (C. 2))
- The Abolition of Bridge Tolls (Scotland) Act 2008 (Commencement) Order 2008 (S.S.I. 2008 No. 22 (C. 3))
- The South West Unit Trunk Roads Area (Temporary Prohibitions of Traffic, Temporary Prohibitions of Overtaking and Temporary Speed Restrictions) Order 2008 (S.S.I. 2008 No. 23)
- The South East Unit Trunk Roads Area (Temporary Prohibitions of Traffic, Temporary Prohibitions of Overtaking and Temporary Speed Restrictions) Order 2008 (S.S.I. 2008 No. 24)
- The North West Unit Trunk Roads Area (Temporary Prohibitions of Traffic, Temporary Prohibitions of Overtaking and Temporary Speed Restrictions) Order 2008 (S.S.I. 2008 No. 25)
- The North East Unit Trunk Roads Area (Temporary Prohibitions of Traffic, Temporary Prohibitions of Overtaking and Temporary Speed Restrictions) Order 2008 (S.S.I. 2008 No. 26)
- The National Health Service (Charges for Drugs and Appliances) (Scotland) Regulations 2008 (S.S.I. 2008 No. 27)
- The Housing (Scotland) Act 2001 (Alteration of Housing Finance Arrangements) Order 2008 (S.S.I. 2008 No. 28)
- The Sea Fish (Prohibited Methods of Fishing) (Firth of Clyde) Order 2008 (S.S.I. 2008 No. 29)
- The Management of Offenders etc. (Scotland) Act 2005 (Members' Remuneration and Supplementary Provisions) Order 2008 (S.S.I. 2008 No. 30)
- The Justice of the Peace Courts (Sheriffdom of Lothian and Borders) etc. Order 2008 (S.S.I. 2008 No. 31)
- The Non-Domestic Rate (Scotland) Order 2008 (S.S.I. 2008 No. 32)
- The Housing Revenue Account General Fund Contribution Limits (Scotland) Order 2008 (S.S.I. 2008 No. 34)
- The Discontinuance of Legalised Police Cells (Scotland) Revocation Rules 2008 (S.S.I. 2008 No. 35)
- The Home Detention Curfew Licence (Prescribed Standard Conditions) (Scotland) Order 2008 (S.S.I. 2008 No. 36)
- The Emergency Workers (Scotland) Act 2005 (Modification) Order 2008 (S.S.I. 2008 No. 37)
- The Home Energy Efficiency Scheme (Scotland) Amendment Regulations 2008 (S.S.I. 2008 No. 38)
- Act of Sederunt (Rules of the Court of Session Amendment) (Fees of Solicitors) 2008 (S.S.I. 2008 No. 39)
- Act of Sederunt (Fees of Solicitors in the Sheriff Court) (Amendment) 2008 (S.S.I. 2008 No. 40)
- Act of Sederunt (Summary Applications, Statutory Applications and Appeals etc. Rules) Amendment (Registration Appeals) 2008 (S.S.I. 2008 No. 41)
- The Criminal Proceedings etc. (Reform) (Scotland) Act 2007 (Commencement No. 3 and Savings) Order 2008 (S.S.I. 2008 No. 42 (C. 4))
- The Road Works (Inspection Fees) (Scotland) Amendment Regulations 2008 (S.S.I. 2008 No. 43)
- The Water and Sewerage Services Undertaking (Lending by the Scottish Ministers) Order 2008 (S.S.I. 2008 No. 44)
- The Bankruptcy and Diligence etc. (Scotland) Act 2007 (Commencement No. 2 and Saving) Order 2008 (S.S.I. 2008 No. 45 (C. 5))
- The Police Grant (Scotland) Order 2008 (S.S.I. 2008 No. 46)
- The Advice and Assistance (Scotland) Amendment Regulations 2008 (S.S.I. 2008 No. 47)
- The Civil Legal Aid (Scotland) Amendment Regulations 2008 (S.S.I. 2008 No. 48)
- The Adult Support and Protection (Scotland) Act 2007 (Commencement No. 2 and Transitional Provisions) Order 2008 (S.S.I. 2008 No. 49 (C. 6))
- The Adult Support and Protection (Scotland) Act 2007 (Adults with Incapacity) (Consequential Provisions) Order 2008 (S.S.I. 2008 No. 50)
- The Adults with Incapacity (Accounts and Funds) (Scotland) Regulations 2008 (S.S.I. 2008 No. 51)
- The Adults with Incapacity (Public Guardian’s Fees) (Scotland) Regulations 2008 (S.S.I. 2008 No. 52)
- The Adults with Incapacity (Recall of Guardians' Powers) (Scotland) Amendment Regulations 2008 (S.S.I. 2008 No. 53)
- The Water Environment (Diffuse Pollution) (Scotland) Regulations 2008 (S.S.I. 2008 No. 54)
- The Adults with Incapacity (Reports in Relation to Guardianship and Intervention Orders) (Scotland) Amendment Regulations 2008 (S.S.I. 2008 No. 55)
- The Adults with Incapacity (Certificates in Relation to Powers of Attorney) (Scotland) Regulations 2008 (S.S.I. 2008 No. 56)
- The Vulnerable Witnesses (Scotland) Act 2004 (Commencement No. 7, Savings and Transitional Provisions) Order 2008 (S.S.I. 2008 No. 57 (C. 7))
- The Crofting Counties Agricultural Grants (Scotland) Amendment Scheme 2008 (S.S.I. 2008 No. 58)
- The Charities References in Documents (Scotland) Amendment Regulations 2008 (S.S.I. 2008 No. 59)
- The National Health Service (Clinical Negligence and Other Risks Indemnity Scheme) (Scotland) Amendment Regulations 2008 (S.S.I. 2008 No. 60)
- Act of Adjournal (Criminal Procedure Rules Amendment) (Criminal Proceedings etc. (Reform) (Scotland) Act 2007) 2008 (S.S.I. 2008 No. 61)
- Act of Adjournal (Criminal Procedure Rules Amendment No. 2) (Miscellaneous) 2008 (S.S.I. 2008 No. 62)
- The Food Protection (Emergency Prohibitions) (Radioactivity in Sheep) Partial Revocation (Scotland) Order 2008 (S.S.I. 2008 No. 63)
- The Agricultural Processing, Marketing and Co-operation Grants (Scotland) Regulations 2008 (S.S.I. 2008 No. 64)
- The Pesticides (Maximum Residue Levels in Crops, Food and Feeding Stuffs) (Scotland) Amendment Regulations 2008 (S.S.I. 2008 No. 65)
- The Leader Grants (Scotland) Regulations 2008 (S.S.I. 2008 No. 66)
- The A77 Trunk Road (Bogend to Dutchhouse) (50 mph Speed Limit) Order 2008 (S.S.I. 2008 No. 67)
- The North East Unit Trunk Roads Area (Temporary Prohibitions of Traffic, Temporary Prohibitions of Overtaking and Temporary Speed Restrictions) (No. 2) Order 2008 (S.S.I. 2008 No. 68)
- The North West Unit Trunk Roads Area (Temporary Prohibitions of Traffic, Temporary Prohibitions of Overtaking and Temporary Speed Restrictions) (No.2) Order 2008 (S.S.I. 2008 No. 69)
- The South East Unit Trunk Roads Area (Temporary Prohibitions of Traffic, Temporary Prohibitions of Overtaking and Temporary Speed Restrictions) (No.2) Order 2008 (S.S.I. 2008 No. 70)
- The South West Unit Trunk Roads Area (Temporary Prohibitions of Traffic, Temporary Prohibitions of Overtaking and Temporary Speed Restrictions) (No.2) Order 2008 (S.S.I. 2008 No. 71)
- Act of Sederunt (Fees of Solicitors in the Sheriff Court) (Amendment No. 2) 2008 (S.S.I. 2008 No. 72)
- The M80/A80 Trunk Road (Temporary Width Restriction of Traffic) Order 2008 (S.S.I. 2008 No. 73)
- The Town and Country Planning (General Permitted Development) (Avian Influenza) (Scotland) Amendment Order 2008 (S.S.I. 2008 No. 74)
- The Intensive Support and Monitoring (Scotland) Regulations 2008 (S.S.I. 2008 No. 75)
- The Housing (Scotland) Act 2006 (Prescribed Documents) Regulations 2008 (S.S.I. 2008 No. 76)
- The Quality Meat Scotland Order 2008 (S.S.I. 2008 No. 77)
- The Community Care (Personal Care and Nursing Care) (Scotland) Amendment Regulations 2008 (S.S.I. 2008 No. 78)
- The Bankruptcy Fees (Scotland) Amendment (No. 2) Regulations 2008 (S.S.I. 2008 No. 79)
- The Valuation and Rating (Exempted Classes) (Scotland) Order 2008 (S.S.I. 2008 No. 80)
- The Bankruptcy (Scotland) Act 1985 (Low Income, Low Asset Debtors etc.) Regulations 2008 (S.S.I. 2008 No. 81)
- The Bankruptcy (Scotland) Regulations 2008 (S.S.I. 2008 No. 82)
- The Non-Domestic Rating (Unoccupied Property) (Scotland) Amendment Regulations 2008 (S.S.I. 2008 No. 83)
- The Non-Domestic Rating (Telecommunications and Canals) (Scotland) Amendment Order 2008 (S.S.I. 2008 No. 84)
- The Non-Domestic Rates (Levying) (Scotland) Regulations 2008 (S.S.I. 2008 No. 85)
- The Pollution Prevention and Control (Designation of Batteries Directive) (Scotland) Order 2008 (S.S.I. 2008 No. 86)
- The Rice Products from the United States of America (Restriction on First Placing on the Market) (Scotland) Regulations 2008 (S.S.I. 2008 No. 87)
- The Road Works (Scottish Road Works Register, Notices, Directions and Designations) (Scotland) Regulations 2008 (S.S.I. 2008 No. 88)
- The Road Works (Settlement of Disputes and Appeals against Directions) (Scotland) Regulations 2008 (S.S.I. 2008 No. 89)
- The Transport (Scotland) Act 2005 (Commencement No. 4) Amendment Order 2008 (S.S.I. 2008 No. 90 (C. 8))
- The A9 Trunk Road (Scrabster) (Prohibition of Waiting) Order 2008 (S.S.I. 2008 No. 91)
- The National Health Service (Superannuation Scheme, Injury Benefits, Additional Voluntary Contributions and Compensation for Premature Retirement) (Scotland) Amendment Regulations 2008 (S.S.I. 2008 No. 92)
- The Justice of the Peace Courts (Sheriffdom of Grampian, Highland and Islands) Order 2008 (S.S.I. 2008 No. 93)
- The Public Contracts and Utilities Contracts (Scotland) Amendment Regulations 2008 (S.S.I. 2008 No. 94)
- The M9/A9 Trunk Road (Temporary Width Restriction of Traffic) Order 2008 (S.S.I. 2008 No. 95)
- The Personal Injuries (NHS Charges) (Amounts) (Scotland) Amendment Regulations 2008 (S.S.I. 2008 No. 96)
- The Meat Products (Scotland) Amendment Regulations 2008 (S.S.I. 2008 No. 97)
- The Meat (Official Controls Charges) (Scotland) Regulations 2008 (S.S.I. 2008 No. 98)
- The Horses (Zootechnical Standards) (Scotland) Regulations 2008 (S.S.I. 2008 No. 99)
- The Rural Development Contracts (Rural Priorities) (Scotland) Regulations 2008 (S.S.I. 2008 No. 100)

== 101-200 ==
- The Aquaculture and Fisheries (Scotland) Act 2007 (Fixed Penalty Notices) Order 2008 (S.S.I. 2008 No. 101)
- The Sea Fishing (Control Procedures for Herring, Mackerel and Horse Mackerel) (Scotland) Order 2008 (S.S.I. 2008 No. 102)
- The Enforcement of Fines (Seizure and Disposal of Vehicles) (Scotland) Regulations 2008 (S.S.I. 2008 No. 103)
- The Enforcement of Fines (Diligence) (Scotland) Regulations 2008 (S.S.I. 2008 No. 104)
- The National Health Service (Charges for Drugs and Appliances) (Scotland) Amendment Regulations 2008 (S.S.I. 2008 No. 105)
- The National Health Service (Optical Charges and Payments) (Scotland) Amendment Regulations 2008 (S.S.I. 2008 No. 106)
- The Budget (Scotland) Act 2007 Amendment Order 2008 (S.S.I. 2008 No. 107)
- The Criminal Procedure (Scotland) Act 1995 Fixed Penalty Order 2008 (S.S.I. 2008 No. 108)
- The Criminal Proceedings etc. (Reform) (Scotland) Act 2007 (Supplemental Provisions) Order 2008 (S.S.I. 2008 No. 109)
- The Trunk Roads (Route A84) (Callander) (Prohibition of Waiting and Loading) (Variation) Order 2008 (S.S.I. 2008 No. 110)
- Act of Sederunt (Summary Applications, Statutory Applications and Appeals etc. Rules) Amendment (Adult Support and Protection (Scotland) Act 2007) 2008 (S.S.I. 2008 No. 111)
- The Scottish Commission for Human Rights Act 2006 (Commencement No. 2) Order 2008 (S.S.I. 2008 No. 112 (C. 9))
- The A90 Trunk Road (Oatyhill) (Temporary Prohibition of Specified Turns) Order 2008 (S.S.I. 2008 No. 113)
- The A96 Trunk Road (West Road, Elgin) (Prohibition of Waiting) Order 2008 (S.S.I. 2008 No. 114)
- The Bankruptcy and Diligence etc. (Scotland) Act 2007 (Commencement No. 3, Savings and Transitionals) Order 2008 (S.S.I. 2008 No. 115 (C. 10))
- The Adult Support and Protection (Scotland) Act 2007 (Commencement No. 2 and Transitional Provisions) Amendment Order 2008 (S.S.I. 2008 No. 116 (C. 11))
- The Police (Special Constables) (Scotland) Regulations 2008 (S.S.I. 2008 No. 117)
- Act of Sederunt (Fees of Shorthand Writers in the Sheriff Court) (Amendment) 2008 (S.S.I. 2008 No. 118)
- Act of Sederunt (Sheriff Court Bankruptcy Rules) 2008 (S.S.I. 2008 No. 119)
- Act of Sederunt (Rules of the Court of Session Amendment No. 2) (Fees of Shorthand Writers) 2008 (S.S.I. 2008 No. 120)
- Act of Sederunt (Sheriff Court Rules Amendment) (Diligence) 2008 (S.S.I. 2008 No. 121)
- Act of Sederunt (Rules of the Court of Session Amendment No. 3) (Bankruptcy and Diligence etc. (Scotland) Act 2007) 2008 (S.S.I. 2008 No. 122)
- Act of Sederunt (Rules of the Court of Session Amendment No. 4) (Miscellaneous) 2008 (S.S.I. 2008 No. 123)
- The Home Detention Curfew Licence (Prescribed Standard Conditions) (Scotland) Revocation Order 2008 (S.S.I. 2008 No. 124)
- The Home Detention Curfew Licence (Prescribed Standard Conditions) (Scotland) (No. 2) Order 2008 (S.S.I. 2008 No. 125)
- The Home Detention Curfew Licence (Amendment of Specified Days) (Scotland) Order 2008 (S.S.I. 2008 No. 126)
- The Plastic Materials and Articles in Contact with Food (Scotland) Regulations 2008 (S.S.I. 2008 No. 127)
- The Sexual Offences Act 2003 (Prescribed Police Stations) (Scotland) Regulations 2008 (S.S.I. 2008 No. 128)
- The Eggs and Chicks (Scotland) Regulations 2008 (S.S.I. 2008 No. 129)
- The Adoption and Children (Scotland) Act 2007 (Commencement No. 1) Order 2008 (S.S.I. 2008 No. 130 (C. 12))
- The Official Statistics (Scotland) Order 2008 (S.S.I. 2008 No. 131)
- The Renewables Obligation (Scotland) Amendment Order 2008 (S.S.I. 2008 No. 132)
- The Housing Support Grant (Scotland) Order 2008 (S.S.I. 2008 No. 133)
- The A92 Trunk Road (B969 Western Avenue Junction, Glenrothes) (Temporary Prohibition of Specified Turns) Order 2008 (S.S.I. 2008 No. 134)
- The Forestry Challenge Funds (Scotland) Regulations 2008 (S.S.I. 2008 No. 135)
- The Local Government Finance (Scotland) Amendment Order 2008 (S.S.I. 2008 No. 136)
- The Advice and Assistance (Financial Conditions) (Scotland) Regulations 2008 (S.S.I. 2008 No. 137)
- The Civil Legal Aid (Financial Conditions) (Scotland) Regulations 2008 (S.S.I. 2008 No. 138)
- The South West Unit Trunk Roads Area (Temporary Prohibitions of Traffic, Temporary Prohibitions of Overtaking and Temporary Speed Restrictions) (No.3) Order 2008 (S.S.I. 2008 No. 139)
- The South East Unit Trunk Roads Area (Temporary Prohibitions of Traffic, Temporary Prohibitions of Overtaking and Temporary Speed Restrictions) (No.3) Order 2008 (S.S.I. 2008 No. 140)
- The North West Unit Trunk Roads Area (Temporary Prohibitions of Traffic, Temporary Prohibitions of Overtaking and Temporary Speed Restrictions) (No. 3) Order 2008 (S.S.I. 2008 No. 141)
- The North East Unit Trunk Roads Area (Temporary Prohibitions of Traffic, Temporary Prohibitions of Overtaking and Temporary Speed Restrictions) (No. 3) Order 2008 (S.S.I. 2008 No. 142)
- The Protected Trust Deeds (Scotland) Regulations 2008 (S.S.I. 2008 No. 143)
- The Companies Act 2006 (Scottish public sector companies to be audited by the Auditor General for Scotland) Order 2008 (S.S.I. 2008 No. 144)
- The A835 Trunk Road (Tore to Maryburgh Cycle Track) (Redetermination of Means of Exercise of Public Right of Passage) Order 2008 (S.S.I. 2008 No. 145)
- The M77/A77 Trunk Road (Bellfield to Dutchhouse) (Temporary Prohibition of Specified Turns) Order 2008 (S.S.I. 2008 No. 146)
- The National Health Service (Travelling Expenses and Remission of Charges) (Scotland) Amendment Regulations 2008 (S.S.I. 2008 No. 147)
- The Specified Products from China (Restriction on First Placing on the Market) (Scotland) Regulations 2008 (S.S.I. 2008 No. 148) - Amended by regulation 2 of SSI 2012/3
- The Management of Offenders etc. (Scotland) Act 2005 (Commencement No. 5) Order 2008 (S.S.I. 2008 No. 149 (C. 13))
- The Tribunals, Courts and Enforcement Act 2007 (Commencement) (Scotland) Order 2008 (S.S.I. 2008 No. 150 (C. 14))
- The Sea Fishing (Enforcement of Community Quota and Third Country Fishing Measures and Restriction on Days at Sea) (Scotland) Order 2008 (S.S.I. 2008 No. 151)
- The Serious Crime Act 2007 (Commencement No. 1) (Scotland) Order 2008 (S.S.I. 2008 No. 152 (C. 15))
- The Plant Health Fees (Scotland) Regulations 2008 (S.S.I. 2008 No. 153)
- The Smoke Control Areas (Authorised Fuels) (Scotland) Regulations 2008 (S.S.I. 2008 No. 154)
- The Animals and Animal Products (Import and Export) (Scotland) Amendment Regulations 2008 (S.S.I. 2008 No. 155)
- The Sea Fishing (Control Procedures for Herring, Mackerel and Horse Mackerel) (Scotland) Amendment Order 2008 (S.S.I. 2008 No. 156)
- The Smoke Control Areas (Exempt Fireplaces) (Scotland) Order 2008 (S.S.I. 2008 No. 157)
- The Products of Animal Origin (Disease Control) (Scotland) Order 2008 (S.S.I. 2008 No. 158)
- The Rural Development Contracts (Land Managers Options) (Scotland) Regulations 2008 (S.S.I. 2008 No. 159)
- The Firefighters' Pension Scheme (Scotland) Order 2007 Amendment Order 2008 (S.S.I. 2008 No. 160)
- The Firefighters' Pension Scheme Amendment (Scotland) Order 2008 (S.S.I. 2008 No. 161)
- The Land Managers Skills Development Grants (Scotland) Regulations 2008 (S.S.I. 2008 No. 162)
- The Designation of Institutions of Higher Education (The Scottish Agricultural College) (Scotland) Order 2008 (S.S.I. 2008 No. 163)
- The Planning etc. (Scotland) Act 2006 (Commencement No. 3) Order 2008 (S.S.I. 2008 No. 164 (C. 16))
- The Planning etc. (Scotland) Act 2006 (Development Planning) (Saving Provisions) Order 2008 (S.S.I. 2008 No. 165)
- The Transmissible Spongiform Encephalopathies (Scotland) Amendment Regulations 2008 (S.S.I. 2008 No. 166)
- The A720 Trunk Road (Edinburgh City Bypass) (Temporary Prohibition of Traffic, Temporary Prohibition of Overtaking and Temporary Speed Restriction) Order 2008 (S.S.I. 2008 No. 167)
- The Lyon Court and Office Fees (Variation) (No. 2) Order 2008 (S.S.I. 2008 No. 168)
- The A82 Trunk Road (Glencoe Village) (40 mph Speed Limit) Order 2008 (S.S.I. 2008 No. 169)
- The Bathing Waters (Scotland) Regulations 2008 (S.S.I. 2008 No. 170)
- The Schools (Health Promotion and Nutrition) (Scotland) Act 2007 (Commencement No. 2) Order 2008 (S.S.I. 2008 No. 171 (C. 17))
- The South West Unit Trunk Roads Area (Temporary Prohibitions of Traffic, Temporary Prohibitions of Overtaking and Temporary Speed Restrictions) (No.4) Order 2008 (S.S.I. 2008 No. 172)
- The South East Unit Trunk Roads Area (Temporary Prohibitions of Traffic, Temporary Prohibitions of Overtaking and Temporary Speed Restrictions) (No.4) Order 2008 (S.S.I. 2008 No. 173)
- The North East Unit Trunk Roads Area (Temporary Prohibitions of Traffic, Temporary Prohibitions of Overtaking and Temporary Speed Restrictions) (No.4) Order 2008 (S.S.I. 2008 No. 174)
- The North West Unit Trunk Roads Area (Temporary Prohibitions of Traffic, Temporary Prohibitions of Overtaking and Temporary Speed Restrictions) (No.4) Order 2008 (S.S.I. 2008 No. 175)
- The Guar Gum (Restriction on First Placing on the Market) (Scotland) Regulations 2008 (S.S.I. 2008 No. 176)
- The Designation of Institutions of Higher Education (The Scottish Agricultural College) (Scotland) (No. 2) Order 2008 (S.S.I. 2008 No. 177)
- The Central Institutions (Recognition) (Scotland) Revocation Regulations 2008 (S.S.I. 2008 No. 178)
- The Justice of the Peace Courts (Sheriffdom of Grampian, Highland and Islands) Amendment Order 2008 (S.S.I. 2008 No. 179)
- The Food Labelling (Declaration of Allergens) (Scotland) Regulations 2008 (S.S.I. 2008 No. 180)
- The Mental Health (Cross-border Visits) (Scotland) Regulations 2008 (S.S.I. 2008 No. 181)
- The Caledonian Maritime Assets Limited (Largs) Harbour Revision Order 2008 (S.S.I. 2008 No. 182)
- The A92/A972 Trunk Road (Kingsway East, Dundee) (Temporary Prohibition of Specified Turns) Order 2008 (S.S.I. 2008 No. 183)
- The Common Agricultural Policy (Single Farm Payment and Support Schemes and Cross-Compliance) (Scotland) Amendment Regulations 2008 (S.S.I. 2008 No. 184)
- The Victim Notification Scheme (Scotland) Order 2008 (S.S.I. 2008 No. 185)
- The Public Transport Users' Committee for Scotland Amendment Order 2008 (S.S.I. 2008 No. 186)
- The Mobility and Access Committee for Scotland Revocation Regulations 2008 (S.S.I. 2008 No. 187)
- The Dumfries and Galloway Council (Port William) Harbour Empowerment Order 2008 (S.S.I. 2008 No. 188)
- The Dumfries and Galloway Council (Isle of Whithorn) Harbour Empowerment Order 2008 (S.S.I. 2008 No. 189)
- The Dumfries and Galloway Council (Garlieston) Harbour Empowerment Order 2008 (S.S.I. 2008 No. 190)
- The Planning etc. (Scotland) Act 2006 (Commencement No. 4) Order 2008 (S.S.I. 2008 No. 191 (C. 18))
- The Criminal Proceedings etc. (Reform) (Scotland) Act 2007 (Commencement No. 4) Order 2008 (S.S.I. 2008 No. 192 (C. 19))
- The Nature Conservation (Scotland) Act 2004 (Commencement No. 3) Order 2008 (S.S.I. 2008 No. 193 (C. 20))
- The Licensing (Transitional Provisions) (Scotland) Order 2008 (S.S.I. 2008 No. 194)
- The Strategic Development Planning Authority Designation (No. 1) (Scotland) Order 2008 (S.S.I. 2008 No. 195)
- The Strategic Development Planning Authority Designation (No. 2) (Scotland) Order 2008 (S.S.I. 2008 No. 196)
- The Strategic Development Planning Authority Designation (No. 3) (Scotland) Order 2008 (S.S.I. 2008 No. 197)
- The Strategic Development Planning Authority Designation (No. 4) (Scotland) Order 2008 (S.S.I. 2008 No. 198)
- The Transport and Works (Scotland) Act 2007 (Access to Land on Application) Order 2008 (S.S.I. 2008 No. 199)
- The Transport and Works (Scotland) Act 2007 (Access to Land by the Scottish Ministers) Order 2008 (S.S.I. 2008 No. 200)

== 201-300 ==
- The Feed (Hygiene and Enforcement) (Scotland) Amendment Regulations 2008 (S.S.I. 2008 No. 201)
- The National Scenic Areas (Scotland) Regulations 2008 (S.S.I. 2008 No. 202)
- The Town and Country Planning (General Permitted Development) (Scotland) Amendment Order 2008 (S.S.I. 2008 No. 203)
- The Individual Learning Account (Scotland) Amendment (No. 2) Regulations 2008 (S.S.I. 2008 No. 204)
- The Education (Student Loans) (Scotland) Amendment Regulations 2008 (S.S.I. 2008 No. 205)
- The Education (Means Testing) (Scotland) Amendment Regulations 2008 (S.S.I. 2008 No. 206)
- The South West Unit Trunk Roads Area (Temporary Prohibitions of Traffic, Temporary Prohibitions of Overtaking and Temporary Speed Restrictions) (No.5) Order 2008 (S.S.I. 2008 No. 207)
- The South East Unit Trunk Roads Area (Temporary Prohibitions of Traffic, Temporary Prohibitions of Overtaking and Temporary Speed Restrictions) (No.5) Order 2008 (S.S.I. 2008 No. 208)
- The North West Unit Trunk Roads Area (Temporary Prohibitions of Traffic, Temporary Prohibitions of Overtaking and Temporary Speed Restrictions) (No.5) Order 2008 (S.S.I. 2008 No. 209)
- The North East Unit Trunk Roads Area (Temporary Prohibitions of Traffic, Temporary Prohibitions of Overtaking and Temporary Speed Restrictions) (No.5) Order 2008 (S.S.I. 2008 No. 210)
- The A76 Trunk Road (Newbridge Drive, Dumfries to Newbridge Village) (Redetermination of Means of Exercise of Public Right of Passage) Order 2008 (S.S.I. 2008 No. 211)
- The Academic Awards and Distinctions (UHI Millennium Institute) (Scotland) Order of Council 2008 (S.S.I. 2008 No. 212)
- The Education (Assisted Places) (Scotland) Amendment Regulations 2008 (S.S.I. 2008 No. 213)
- The St Mary’s Music School (Aided Places) (Scotland) Amendment Regulations 2008 (S.S.I. 2008 No. 214)
- The Feeding Stuffs (Scotland) Amendment Regulations 2008 (S.S.I. 2008 No. 215)
- The Spreadable Fats, Milk and Milk Products (Scotland) Regulations 2008 (S.S.I. 2008 No. 216)
- The Title Conditions (Scotland) Act 2003 (Conservation Bodies) Amendment Order 2008 (S.S.I. 2008 No. 217)
- The Official Feed and Food Controls (Scotland) Amendment Regulations 2008 (S.S.I. 2008 No. 218)
- The Diseases of Animals (Approved Disinfectants) (Scotland) Order 2008 (S.S.I. 2008 No. 219)
- The Academic Awards and Distinctions (Additional Powers of the University of Aberdeen) Order of Council 2008 (S.S.I. 2008 No. 220)
- The Register of Sites of Special Scientific Interest (Scotland) Regulations 2008 (S.S.I. 2008 No. 221)
- The Registration of Fish Farming and Shellfish Farming Businesses Amendment (Scotland) Order 2008 (S.S.I. 2008 No. 222)
- Act of Sederunt (Sheriff Court Rules) (Miscellaneous Amendments) 2008 (S.S.I. 2008 No. 223)
- The National Health Service Pension Scheme (Scotland) Regulations 2008 (S.S.I. 2008 No. 224)
- The National Health Service Superannuation Scheme (Additional Voluntary Contributions, Injury Benefits and Compensation for Premature Retirement) (Scotland) Amendment Regulations 2008 (S.S.I. 2008 No. 225)
- The National Health Service Superannuation Scheme (Scotland) Amendment Regulations 2008 (S.S.I. 2008 No. 226)
- The Teachers' Superannuation (Scotland) Amendment Regulations 2008 (S.S.I. 2008 No. 227)
- The Local Government Pension Scheme (Administration) (Scotland) Regulations 2008 (S.S.I. 2008 No. 228)
- The Local Government Pension Scheme (Transitional Provisions) (Scotland) Regulations 2008 (S.S.I. 2008 No. 229)
- The Local Government Pension Scheme (Benefits, Membership and Contributions) (Scotland) Regulations 2008 (S.S.I. 2008 No. 230)
- The A77 Trunk Road (Park End to Bennane Improvement) (Side Roads) Order 2008 (S.S.I. 2008 No. 231)
- The Offenders Assisting Investigations and Prosecutions (Substituted Sentences) (Scotland) Order 2008 (S.S.I. 2008 No. 232)
- The Rural Development Contracts (Rural Priorities) (Scotland) Amendment Regulations 2008 (S.S.I. 2008 No. 233)
- The Bluetongue (Scotland) Amendment Order 2008 (S.S.I. 2008 No. 234)
- The Graduate Endowment (Scotland) Regulations 2008 (S.S.I. 2008 No. 235)
- The Court of Session etc. Fees Amendment Order 2008 (S.S.I. 2008 No. 236)
- The High Court of Justiciary Fees Amendment Order 2008 (S.S.I. 2008 No. 237)
- The Adults with Incapacity (Public Guardian’s Fees) (Scotland) Amendment Regulations 2008 (S.S.I. 2008 No. 238)
- The Sheriff Court Fees Amendment Order 2008 (S.S.I. 2008 No. 239)
- The Criminal Legal Assistance (Fees and Information etc.) (Scotland) Regulations 2008 (S.S.I. 2008 No. 240)
- The Fundable Bodies (The Scottish Agricultural College) (Scotland) Order 2008 (S.S.I. 2008 No. 241)
- The A90 Trunk Road (Glendoick) (Temporary Prohibition of Specified Turns) Order 2008 (S.S.I. 2008 No. 242)
- The Roads (Scotland) Act 1984 (Fixed Penalty) Regulations 2008 (S.S.I. 2008 No. 243)
- The Road Works (Fixed Penalty) (Scotland) Regulations 2008 (S.S.I. 2008 No. 244)
- The Glasgow Commonwealth Games Act 2008 (Commencement No. 1) Order 2008 (S.S.I. 2008 No. 245 (C. 21))
- The Electricity Works (Environmental Impact Assessment) (Scotland) Amendment Regulations 2008 (S.S.I. 2008 No. 246)
- The Mobility and Access Committee for Scotland Revocation Regulations 2008 Revocation Regulations 2008 (S.S.I. 2008 No. 247)
- The Public Transport Users' Committee for Scotland Amendment Order 2008 Revocation Order 2008 (S.S.I. 2008 No. 248)
- The A737/A738 Trunk Road (Park Lane, Old Woodwynd Road, The Meadows, Claremont Crescent, Kilwinning) (Temporary Prohibition of Specified Turns) Order 2008 (S.S.I. 2008 No. 249)
- The A977 Trunk Road (Kincardine) (30 mph and 40 mph Speed Limit) Order 2008 (S.S.I. 2008 No. 250)
- The Advice and Assistance (Limits, Conditions and Representation) (Scotland) Regulations 2008 (S.S.I. 2008 No. 251)
- The A9 Trunk Road (Aberuthven to Loaninghead) (Temporary Prohibition of Specified Turns) Order 2008 (S.S.I. 2008 No. 252)
- The Public Service Vehicles (Registration of Local Services) (Scotland) Amendment Regulations 2008 (S.S.I. 2008 No. 253)
- The M77/A77 Trunk Road (Bogend Toll) (Temporary Prohibition of Specified Turns) Order 2008 (S.S.I. 2008 No. 254)
- The South West Unit Trunk Roads Area (Temporary Prohibitions of Traffic, Temporary Prohibitions of Overtaking and Temporary Speed Restrictions) (No.6) Order 2008 (S.S.I. 2008 No. 255)
- The South East Unit Trunk Roads Area (Temporary Prohibitions of Traffic, Temporary Prohibitions of Overtaking and Temporary Speed Restrictions) (No.6) Order 2008 (S.S.I. 2008 No. 256)
- The North West Unit Trunk Roads Area (Temporary Prohibitions of Traffic, Temporary Prohibitions of Overtaking and Temporary Speed Restrictions) (No.6) Order 2008 (S.S.I. 2008 No. 257)
- The North East Unit Trunk Roads Area (Temporary Prohibitions of Traffic, Temporary Prohibitions of Overtaking and Temporary Speed Restrictions) (No.6) Order 2008 (S.S.I. 2008 No. 258)
- The Human Tissue (Scotland) Act 2006 (Consequential Amendment) Order 2008 (S.S.I. 2008 No. 259)
- The Protection of Children (Scotland) Act 2003 (Amendment of the Definition of Child Care Position) Order 2008 (S.S.I. 2008 No. 260)
- The Plastic Materials and Articles in Contact with Food (Scotland) Amendment Regulations 2008 (S.S.I. 2008 No. 261)
- The Further and Higher Education (Scotland) Act 1992 Modification Order 2008 (S.S.I. 2008 No. 262)
- The Water Environment (Relevant Enactments and Designation of Responsible Authorities and Functions) Order 2008 (S.S.I. 2008 No. 263)
- The Crime (International Co-operation) Act 2003 (Designation of Participating Countries) (Scotland) Order 2008 (S.S.I. 2008 No. 264)
- The Nutritional Requirements for Food and Drink in Schools (Scotland) Regulations 2008 (S.S.I. 2008 No. 265)
- The Control of Salmonella in Poultry (Scotland) Order 2008 (S.S.I. 2008 No. 266)
- The M90 Trunk Road (Gairneybridge to Milnathort) (Temporary 50 mph Speed Limit) Order 2008 (S.S.I. 2008 No. 267)
- The Charity Test (Specified Bodies) (Scotland) Order 2008 (S.S.I. 2008 No. 268)
- The Water Environment and Water Services (Scotland) Act 2003 (Commencement No. 8) Order 2008 (S.S.I. 2008 No. 269 (C. 22))
- The A737/A738 Trunk Road (Howgate, Kilwinning to Cockenzie Road, Dalvargen) (Temporary Width and Weight Restriction of Traffic) Order 2008 (S.S.I. 2008 No. 270)
- The A82 Trunk Road (Scottish Open Golf Tournament, Loch Lomond) (Special Event) (Temporary Restriction of Speed) Order 2008 (S.S.I. 2008 No. 271)
- The A92/A972 Trunk Road (Scott Fyffe Roundabout, Dundee to Pitkerro Roundabout, Dundee) (Temporary Prohibition of Specified Turns) Order 2008 (S.S.I. 2008 No. 272)
- The M90/A90 Trunk Road (Bruntland Road Junction, Portlethen) (Temporary Prohibition of Specified Turns) Order 2008 (S.S.I. 2008 No. 273)
- The A96 Trunk Road (Moss Street, Keith) (Temporary Prohibition of Specified Turns) Order 2008 (S.S.I. 2008 No. 274)
- Act of Adjournal (Criminal Procedure Rules Amendment No. 3) (Seizure and Disposal of Vehicles) 2008 (S.S.I. 2008 No. 275)
- The South West Unit Trunk Roads Area (Temporary Prohibitions of Traffic, Temporary Prohibitions of Overtaking and Temporary Speed Restrictions) (No.7) Order 2008 (S.S.I. 2008 No. 276)
- The North West Unit Trunk Roads Area (Temporary Prohibitions of Traffic, Temporary Prohibitions of Overtaking and Temporary Speed Restrictions) (No.7) Order 2008 (S.S.I. 2008 No. 277)
- The South East Unit Trunk Roads Area (Temporary Prohibitions of Traffic, Temporary Prohibitions of Overtaking and Temporary Speed Restrictions) (No.7) Order 2008 (S.S.I. 2008 No. 278)
- The North East Unit Trunk Roads Area (Temporary Prohibitions of Traffic, Temporary Prohibitions of Overtaking and Temporary Speed Restrictions) (No.7) Order 2008 (S.S.I. 2008 No. 279)
- The A84/A85 Trunk Road (Strathyre) (30 mph and 40 mph Speed Limits) Order 2008 (S.S.I. 2008 No. 280)
- The A90 Trunk Road (B957 Tannadice Junction) (Temporary Prohibition of Specified Turns) Order 2008 (S.S.I. 2008 No. 281)
- The Adoption and Children (Scotland) Act 2007 (Commencement No. 2) Order 2008 (S.S.I. 2008 No. 282 (C. 23))
- The Housing Grants (Application Forms) (Scotland) Amendment Regulations 2008 (S.S.I. 2008 No. 283)
- The South West Unit Trunk Roads Area (Temporary Prohibitions of Traffic, Temporary Prohibitions of Overtaking and Temporary Speed Restrictions) (No.8) Order 2008 (S.S.I. 2008 No. 284)
- The South East Unit Trunk Roads Area (Temporary Prohibitions of Traffic, Temporary Prohibitions of Overtaking and Temporary Speed Restrictions) (No.8) Order 2008 (S.S.I. 2008 No. 285)
- The North West Unit Trunk Roads Area (Temporary Prohibitions of Traffic, Temporary Prohibitions of Overtaking and Temporary Speed Restrictions) (No.8) Order 2008 (S.S.I. 2008 No. 286)
- The North East Unit Trunk Roads Area (Temporary Prohibitions of Traffic, Temporary Prohibitions of Overtaking and Temporary Speed Restrictions) (No.8) Order 2008 (S.S.I. 2008 No. 287)
- The National Health Service (Travelling Expenses and Remission of Charges) (Scotland) Amendment (No. 2) Regulations 2008 (S.S.I. 2008 No. 288)
- The National Health Service (Optical Charges and Payments) (Scotland) Amendment (No. 2) Regulations 2008 (S.S.I. 2008 No. 289)
- The National Health Service (Charges to Overseas Visitors) (Scotland) Amendment Regulations 2008 (S.S.I. 2008 No. 290)
- The Public Contracts and Utilities Contracts (Common Procurement Vocabulary Codes) Amendment (Scotland) Regulations 2008 (S.S.I. 2008 No. 291)
- The Licensing (Scotland) Act 2005 (Commencement No. 5) Order 2008 (S.S.I. 2008 No. 292 (C. 24))
- The Divorce etc. (Pensions) (Scotland) Amendment Regulations 2008 (S.S.I. 2008 No. 293)
- The Less Favoured Area Support Scheme (Scotland) Amendment Regulations 2008 (S.S.I. 2008 No. 294)
- The Smoke Control Areas (Authorised Fuels) (Scotland) (No. 2) Regulations 2008 (S.S.I. 2008 No. 295)
- The Smoke Control Areas (Exempt Fireplaces) (Scotland) (No. 2) Order 2008 (S.S.I. 2008 No. 296)
- The Freedom of Information (Scotland) Act 2002 (Scottish Public Authorities) Amendment Order 2008 (S.S.I. 2008 No. 297)
- The Action Programme for Nitrate Vulnerable Zones (Scotland) Regulations 2008 (S.S.I. 2008 No. 298)
- The Potatoes Originating in Poland (Notification) (Scotland) Amendment Order 2008 (S.S.I. 2008 No. 299)
- The Plant Health (Scotland) Amendment Order 2008 (S.S.I. 2008 No. 300)

== 301-400 ==
- The M9/A9 Trunk Road (Olrig Street, Traill Street & Sir George’s Street, Thurso) (Prohibition of Waiting and Loading) Order 2008 (S.S.I. 2008 No. 301)
- The Dangerous Wild Animals Act 1976 (Modification) (Scotland) Order 2008 (S.S.I. 2008 No. 302)
- The Adoptions with a Foreign Element (Special Restrictions on Adoptions from Abroad) (Scotland) Regulations 2008 (S.S.I. 2008 No. 303)
- The Special Restrictions on Adoptions from Cambodia (Scotland) Order 2008 (S.S.I. 2008 No. 304)
- The Special Restrictions on Adoptions from Guatemala (Scotland) Order 2008 (S.S.I. 2008 No. 305)
- The Adult Support and Protection (Scotland) Act 2007 (Restriction on the Authorisation of Council Officers) Order 2008 (S.S.I. 2008 No. 306)
- The Restriction of Liberty Order (Scotland) Amendment Regulations 2008 (S.S.I. 2008 No. 307)
- The Housing (Scotland) Act 2006 (Commencement No. 6 and Transitional Provision) Order 2008 (S.S.I. 2008 No. 308 (C. 25))
- The Energy Performance of Buildings (Scotland) Regulations 2008 (S.S.I. 2008 No. 309)
- The Building (Scotland) Amendment Regulations 2008 (S.S.I. 2008 No. 310)
- The Legal Profession and Legal Aid (Scotland) Act 2007 (Commencement No. 5) Order 2008 (S.S.I. 2008 No. 311 (C. 26))
- The National Health Service (Functions of the Common Services Agency) (Scotland) Order 2008 (S.S.I. 2008 No. 312)
- The Homelessness etc. (Scotland) Act 2003 (Commencement No. 3) Order 2008 (S.S.I. 2008 No. 313 (C. 27))
- The Adult Support and Protection (Scotland) Act 2007 (Commencement No. 3 and Related Amendments) Order 2008 (S.S.I. 2008 No. 314 (C. 28))
- The National Health Service (Recognition of Health Service Bodies) (Scotland) Order 2008 (S.S.I. 2008 No. 315)
- The Mental Health (Certificates for Medical Treatment) (Scotland) Amendment Regulations 2008 (S.S.I. 2008 No. 316)
- The Inshore Fishing (Prohibition on Fishing) (Lamlash Bay) (Scotland) Order 2008 (S.S.I. 2008 No. 317)
- The South West Unit Trunk Roads Area (Temporary Prohibitions of Traffic, Temporary Prohibitions of Overtaking and Temporary Speed Restrictions) (No.9) Order 2008 (S.S.I. 2008 No. 318)
- The South East Unit Trunk Roads Area (Temporary Prohibitions of Traffic, Temporary Prohibitions of Overtaking and Temporary Speed Restrictions) (No.9) Order 2008 (S.S.I. 2008 No. 319)
- The North East Unit Trunk Roads Area (Temporary Prohibitions of Traffic, Temporary Prohibitions of Overtaking and Temporary Speed Restrictions) (No.9) Order 2008 (S.S.I. 2008 No. 320)
- The North West Unit Trunk Roads Area (Temporary Prohibitions of Traffic, Temporary Prohibitions of Overtaking and Temporary Speed Restrictions) (No.9) Order 2008 (S.S.I. 2008 No. 321)
- The Infant Formula and Follow-on Formula (Scotland) Amendment Regulations 2008 (S.S.I. 2008 No. 322)
- The A68 Trunk Road (Dalkeith Northern Bypass) (Temporary Prohibition of Traffic, Temporary Prohibition of Overtaking and Temporary Speed Restriction) Order 2008 (S.S.I. 2008 No. 323)
- The Notice to Local Authorities (Scotland) Regulations 2008 (S.S.I. 2008 No. 324)
- The Dumfries and Galloway (Electoral Arrangements) Amendment Order 2008 (S.S.I. 2008 No. 325)
- The Fish Farming Businesses (Record Keeping) (Scotland) Order 2008 (S.S.I. 2008 No. 326)
- The Bluetongue (Scotland) Amendment (No. 2) Order 2008 (S.S.I. 2008 No. 327)
- The Justice of the Peace Court (Sheriffdom of Glasgow and Strathkelvin) Order 2008 (S.S.I. 2008 No. 328)
- The Criminal Proceedings etc. (Reform) (Scotland) Act 2007 (Commencement No. 5) Order 2008 (S.S.I. 2008 No. 329 (C. 29))
- The Local Government Finance (Scotland) Order 2008 (S.S.I. 2008 No. 33)
- The Stipendiary Magistrates (Specified Day) (Sheriffdom of Glasgow and Strathkelvin) Order 2008 (S.S.I. 2008 No. 330)
- The Peterhead Port Authority Harbour Revision Order 2008 (S.S.I. 2008 No. 331)
- The Legal Profession and Legal Aid (Scotland) Act 2007 (Transitional, Savings and Consequential Provisions) Order 2008 (S.S.I. 2008 No. 332)
- The Mental Health (Absconding Patients from Other Jurisdictions) (Scotland) Regulations 2008 (S.S.I. 2008 No. 333)
- The Bankruptcy (Scotland) Amendment Regulations 2008 (S.S.I. 2008 No. 334)
- Act of Sederunt (Summary Applications, Statutory Applications and Appeals etc. Rules) Amendment (Adult Support and Protection (Scotland) Act 2007) (No.2) 2008 (S.S.I. 2008 No. 335)
- The Housing Grants (Assessment of Contributions) (Scotland) Amendment Regulations 2008 (S.S.I. 2008 No. 336)
- The A9 Trunk Road (Bankfoot Junction Improvement) (Side Roads) Order 2008 (S.S.I. 2008 No. 337)
- The A9 Trunk Road (Bankfoot Junction Improvement) (Slip Roads) Order 2008 (S.S.I. 2008 No. 338)
- The Freedom of Information (Relaxation of Statutory Prohibitions on Disclosure of Information) (Scotland) Order 2008 (S.S.I. 2008 No. 339)
- The A68 Trunk Road (Dalkeith Northern Bypass) (Temporary Prohibition of Traffic, Temporary Prohibition of Overtaking and Temporary Speed Restriction) (No.2) Order 2008 (S.S.I. 2008 No. 340)
- The A90 Trunk Road (North Anderson Drive, Aberdeen) (Prohibition of Specified Turns) Order 2008 (S.S.I. 2008 No. 341)
- The Pesticides (Maximum Residue Levels) (Scotland) Regulations 2008 (S.S.I. 2008 No. 342)
- The North East Unit Trunk Roads Area (Temporary Prohibitions of Traffic, Temporary Prohibitions of Overtaking and Temporary Speed Restrictions) (No.10) Order 2008 (S.S.I. 2008 No. 343)
- The North West Unit Trunk Roads Area (Temporary Prohibitions of Traffic, Temporary Prohibitions of Overtaking and Temporary Speed Restrictions) (No.10) Order 2008 (S.S.I. 2008 No. 344)
- The South East Unit Trunk Roads Area (Temporary Prohibitions of Traffic, Temporary Prohibitions of Overtaking and Temporary Speed Restrictions) (No. 10) Order 2008 (S.S.I. 2008 No. 345)
- The South West Unit Trunk Roads Area (Temporary Prohibitions of Traffic, Temporary Prohibitions of Overtaking and Temporary Speed Restrictions) (No.10) Order 2008 (S.S.I. 2008 No. 346)
- The A96 Trunk Road (Church Road, Keith) (Special Event) (Temporary Prohibition of Traffic) Order 2008 (S.S.I. 2008 No. 347)
- The Public Appointments and Public Bodies etc. (Scotland) Act 2003 (Amendment of Specified Authorities) Order 2008 (S.S.I. 2008 No. 348)
- Act of Sederunt (Rules of the Court of Session Amendment No. 5) (Miscellaneous) 2008 (S.S.I. 2008 No. 349)
- The Plant Health (Scotland) Amendment (No. 2) Order 2008 (S.S.I. 2008 No. 350)
- The M90/A90 Trunk Road (Powrie Brae) (Temporary Prohibition of Specified Turns) Order 2008 (S.S.I. 2008 No. 351)
- The Legal Profession and Legal Aid (Scotland) Act 2007 (Abolition of the Scottish legal services ombudsman) Order 2008 (S.S.I. 2008 No. 352)
- The A82 Trunk Road (Invermoriston to Fort Augustus, Portclair) (Temporary Prohibition of Traffic, Temporary Prohibition of Overtaking and Temporary Speed Restriction) Order 2008 (S.S.I. 2008 No. 353)
- The A68 Trunk Road (Station Bar, Jedburgh) (Temporary Width Restriction of Traffic) Order 2008 (S.S.I. 2008 No. 354)
- The Scottish Commission for Human Rights (Specification) Order 2008 (S.S.I. 2008 No. 355)
- The Mental Health (England and Wales Cross-border transfer: patients subject to requirements other than detention) (Scotland) Regulations 2008 (S.S.I. 2008 No. 356)
- Act of Sederunt (Transfer of Judicial Review Applications from the Court of Session) 2008 (S.S.I. 2008 No. 357)
- The National Health Service Central Register (Scotland) Amendment Regulations 2008 (S.S.I. 2008 No. 358)
- The Business Improvement Districts (Scotland) Amendment Regulations 2008 (S.S.I. 2008 No. 359)
- The Valuation for Rating (Plant and Machinery) (Scotland) Amendment Regulations 2008 (S.S.I. 2008 No. 360)
- The Whiteness Marina Harbour Revision Order 2008 (S.S.I. 2008 No. 361)
- The Criminal Proceedings etc. (Reform) (Scotland) Act 2007 (Commencement No. 6) Order 2008 (S.S.I. 2008 No. 362 (C. 30))
- The Justice of the Peace Courts (Sheriffdom of Tayside, Central and Fife) Order 2008 (S.S.I. 2008 No. 363)
- The A68 Trunk Road (Pathhead) (30 mph Speed Limit) Order 2008 (S.S.I. 2008 No. 364)
- Act of Sederunt (Sheriff Court Rules) (Miscellaneous Amendments) (No. 2) 2008 (S.S.I. 2008 No. 365)
- Act of Sederunt (Fees of Messengers-at-Arms) (EC Service Regulation) 2008 (S.S.I. 2008 No. 366)
- The A68 Trunk Road (Dalkeith) (30 mph Speed Limit and St David’s Primary School part-time 20 mph Speed Limit) Order 2008 (S.S.I. 2008 No. 367)
- The Sheep and Goats (Identification and Traceability) (Scotland) Amendment Regulations 2008 (S.S.I. 2008 No. 368)
- The Pigs (Records, Identification and Movement) Amendment (Scotland) Order 2008 (S.S.I. 2008 No. 369)
- The Non-Domestic Rating (Rural Areas and Rateable Value Limits) (Scotland) Amendment Order 2008 (S.S.I. 2008 No. 370)
- The Non-Domestic Rating (Rural Areas and Rateable Value Limits) (Scotland) Amendment Order 2009 Amendment Order 2008 (S.S.I. 2008 No. 371)
- The European Communities (Service of Judicial and Extrajudicial Documents) (Scotland) Amendment Regulations 2008 (S.S.I. 2008 No. 372)
- The A96 Trunk Road (Moss Street, Keith) (Prohibition of Waiting and Loading ) Order 2008 (S.S.I. 2008 No. 373)
- The Justice of the Peace Court (Sheriffdom of Glasgow and Strathkelvin) Amendment Order 2008 (S.S.I. 2008 No. 374)
- Act of Sederunt (Summary Applications, Statutory Applications and Appeals etc. Rules) Amendment (Adult Support and Protection (Scotland) Act 2007) (No. 3) 2008 (S.S.I. 2008 No. 375)
- The Public Contracts and Utilities Contracts (Postal Services and Common Procurement Vocabulary Codes) Amendment (Scotland) Regulations 2008 (S.S.I. 2008 No. 376)
- The Prisons and Young Offenders Institutions (Scotland) Amendment Rules 2008 (S.S.I. 2008 No. 377)
- The Zoonoses and Animal By-Products (Fees) (Scotland) Amendment Regulations 2008 (S.S.I. 2008 No. 378)
- The Sports Grounds and Sporting Events (Designation) (Scotland) Amendment Order 2008 (S.S.I. 2008 No. 379)
- The Adults with Incapacity (Electronic Communications) (Scotland) Order 2008 (S.S.I. 2008 No. 380)
- The A830 Trunk Road (Arisaig to Loch nan Uamh Improvement) (Temporary Prohibition of Traffic, Temporary Prohibition of Overtaking and Temporary Speed Restriction) Order 2008 (S.S.I. 2008 No. 381)
- The South West Unit Trunk Roads Area (Temporary Prohibitions of Traffic, Temporary Prohibitions of Overtaking and Temporary Speed Restrictions) (No.11) Order 2008 (S.S.I. 2008 No. 382)
- The South East Unit Trunk Roads Area (Temporary Prohibitions of Traffic, Temporary Prohibitions of Overtaking and Temporary Speed Restrictions) (No.11) Order 2008 (S.S.I. 2008 No. 383)
- The North West Unit Trunk Roads Area (Temporary Prohibitions of Traffic, Temporary Prohibitions of Overtaking and Temporary Speed Restrictions) (No.11) Order 2008 (S.S.I. 2008 No. 384)
- The North East Unit Trunk Roads Area (Temporary Prohibitions of Traffic, Temporary Prohibitions of Overtaking and Temporary Speed Restrictions) (No.11) Order 2008 (S.S.I. 2008 No. 385)
- The Book of Scottish Connections Regulations 2008 (S.S.I. 2008 No. 386)
- The Police Pensions (Amendment) (Scotland) Regulations 2008 (S.S.I. 2008 No. 387)
- The Edinburgh Napier University Order of Council 2008 (S.S.I. 2008 No. 388)
- The Energy Performance of Buildings (Scotland) Amendment Regulations 2008 (S.S.I. 2008 No. 389)
- The National Health Service (Travelling Expenses and Remission of Charges) (Scotland) Amendment (No. 3) Regulations 2008 (S.S.I. 2008 No. 390)
- The Title Conditions (Scotland) Act 2003 (Rural Housing Bodies) Amendment Order 2008 (S.S.I. 2008 No. 391)
- The A77 Trunk Road (Dalrymple Street, Girvan) (Special Event) (Temporary Prohibition of Traffic) Order 2008 (S.S.I. 2008 No. 392)
- The Insolvency (Scotland) Rules 1986 Amendment Rules 2008 (S.S.I. 2008 No. 393)
- The Action Programme for Nitrate Vulnerable Zones (Scotland) Amendment Regulations 2008 (S.S.I. 2008 No. 394)
- The Eggs and Chicks (Scotland) (No. 2) Regulations 2008 (S.S.I. 2008 No. 395)
- The Mental Health Tribunal for Scotland (Practice and Procedure) (No. 2) Amendment Rules 2008 (S.S.I. 2008 No. 396)
- The Building (Fees) (Scotland) Amendment Regulations 2008 (S.S.I. 2008 No. 397)
- The A82 Trunk Road (Ballachulish) (50 mph Speed Limit) Order 2008 (S.S.I. 2008 No. 398)
- The Pre-release Access to Official Statistics (Scotland) Order 2008 (S.S.I. 2008 No. 399)
- The Provision of School Lunches (Disapplication of the Requirement to Charge) (Scotland) Order 2008 (S.S.I. 2008 No. 400)

== 401-441 ==
- Act of Sederunt (Rules of the Court of Session Amendment No. 6) (Counter-Terrorism Act 2008) 2008 (S.S.I. 2008 No. 401)
- The Private Landlord Registration (Advice and Assistance) (Scotland) Amendment Regulations 2008 (S.S.I. 2008 No. 402)
- The Private Landlord Registration (Information and Fees) (Scotland) Amendment Regulations 2008 (S.S.I. 2008 No. 403)
- The Law Applicable to Non-Contractual Obligations (Scotland) Regulations 2008 (S.S.I. 2008 No. 404)
- The Local Electoral Administration and Registration Services (Scotland) Act 2006 (Commencement No. 4) Order 2008 (S.S.I. 2008 No. 405 (C. 31))
- The Housing (Scotland) Act 2006 (Scheme of Assistance) Regulations 2008 (S.S.I. 2008 No. 406)
- The A85 Trunk Road (Dalmally) (40 mph Speed Limit) Order 2008 (S.S.I. 2008 No. 407)
- The A76 Trunk Road (Glenairlie Improvement) (Temporary Prohibition of Traffic, Temporary Prohibition of Overtaking and Temporary Speed Restriction) Order 2008 (S.S.I. 2008 No. 408)
- The M9/A9 Trunk Road (Field Accesses North of the B934 Junction, Perthshire) (Prohibition of Specified Turns) Order 2008 (S.S.I. 2008 No. 409)
- The Pollution Prevention and Control (Scotland) Amendment Regulations 2008 (S.S.I. 2008 No. 410)
- The Planning etc. (Scotland) Act 2006 (Commencement No. 5) Order 2008 (S.S.I. 2008 No. 411 (C. 32))
- The Fundable Bodies (Scotland) Order 2008 (S.S.I. 2008 No. 412)
- The Protection of Charities Assets (Exemption) and the Charity Test (Specified Bodies) (Scotland) Amendment Order 2008 (S.S.I. 2008 No. 413)
- The Local Government (Allowances and Expenses) (Scotland) Amendment Regulations 2008 (S.S.I. 2008 No. 414)
- The Local Governance (Scotland) Act 2004 (Remuneration) Amendment Regulations 2008 (S.S.I. 2008 No. 415)
- The Assistance by Way of Representation (District Court Financial Limit) (Scotland) Order 2008 (S.S.I. 2008 No. 416)
- The Transmissible Spongiform Encephalopathies (Scotland) Amendment (No. 2) Regulations 2008 (S.S.I. 2008 No. 417)
- The Beef and Veal Labelling (Scotland) Regulations 2008 (S.S.I. 2008 No. 418)
- The Freshwater Fish Conservation (Prohibition on Fishing for Eels) (Scotland) Regulations 2008 (S.S.I. 2008 No. 419)
- The A702 Trunk Road (Biggar High Street, Biggar) (Special Event) (Temporary Prohibition of Traffic) Order 2008 (S.S.I. 2008 No. 420)
- The A7 Trunk Road (Auchenrivock Improvement) (Temporary Prohibition of Traffic, Temporary Prohibition of Overtaking and Temporary Speed Restriction) Order 2008 (S.S.I. 2008 No. 421)
- The Stornoway Harbour Revision (Constitution) Order 2008 (S.S.I. 2008 No. 422)
- The Zoonoses and Animal By-Products (Fees) (Scotland) Amendment (No. 2) Regulations 2008 (S.S.I. 2008 No. 423)
- The Budget (Scotland) Act 2008 Amendment Order 2008 (S.S.I. 2008 No. 424)
- The Conservation (Natural Habitats, &c.) Amendment (No. 2) (Scotland) Regulations 2008 (S.S.I. 2008 No. 425)
- The Town and Country Planning (Development Planning) (Scotland) Regulations 2008 (S.S.I. 2008 No. 426)
- The Planning etc. (Scotland) Act 2006 (Development Planning) (Saving, Transitional and Consequential Provisions) Order 2008 (S.S.I. 2008 No. 427)
- The Legal Profession and Legal Aid (Scotland) Act 2007 (Handling Complaints and Specification of Interest Rates) Order 2008 (S.S.I. 2008 No. 428)
- The Scottish Water (Loch of Boardhouse) Water Order 2008 (S.S.I. 2008 No. 429)
- Act of Sederunt (Fees of Sheriff Officers) 2008 (S.S.I. 2008 No. 430)
- Act of Sederunt (Fees of Messengers-at-Arms) 2008 (S.S.I. 2008 No. 431)
- The Town and Country Planning (Development Management Procedure) (Scotland) Regulations 2008 (S.S.I. 2008 No. 432)
- The Town and Country Planning (Schemes of Delegation and Local Review Procedure) (Scotland) Regulations 2008 (S.S.I. 2008 No. 433)
- The Town and Country Planning (Appeals) (Scotland) Regulations 2008 (S.S.I. 2008 No. 434)
- Act of Sederunt (Sheriff Court European Small Claims Procedure Rules) 2008 (S.S.I. 2008 No. 435)
- Act of Sederunt (Sheriff Court European Order for Payment Procedure Rules) 2008 (S.S.I. 2008 No. 436)
- The North East Unit Trunk Roads Area (Temporary Prohibitions of Traffic, Temporary Prohibitions of Overtaking and Temporary Speed Restrictions) (No.12) Order 2008 (S.S.I. 2008 No. 437)
- The North West Unit Trunk Roads Area (Temporary Prohibitions of Traffic, Temporary Prohibitions of Overtaking and Temporary Speed Restrictions) (No.12) Order 2008 (S.S.I. 2008 No. 438)
- The South East Unit Trunk Roads Area (Temporary Prohibitions of Traffic, Temporary Prohibitions of Overtaking and Temporary Speed Restrictions) (No.12) Order 2008 (S.S.I. 2008 No. 439)
- The South West Unit Trunk Roads Area (Temporary Prohibitions of Traffic, Temporary Prohibitions of Overtaking and Temporary Speed Restrictions) (No.12) Order 2008 (S.S.I. 2008 No. 440)
- The M8 Motorway (Junction 21, Paisley Road) (Temporary Prohibition of Traffic) Order 2008 (S.S.I. 2008 No. 441)
