= List of places in Renfrewshire =

Map of places in Renfrewshire compiled from this list
See the list of places in Scotland for places in other counties.

This is a list of towns and villages in the Renfrewshire council area of Scotland.

- Bishopton
- Bridge of Weir
- Brookfield
- Carruthmuir
- Craigends
- Crosslee
- Elderslie
- Erskine
- Houston
- Howwood
- Inchinnan
- Johnstone
- Kilbarchan
- Langbank
- Linwood
- Lochwinnoch
- Paisley
- Windy Hill

== See also ==
- List of places in Scotland
