= List of acts of the Scottish Parliament from 2008 =

This is a list of acts of the Scottish Parliament passed in 2008. Acts of the Scottish Parliament are enacted by the Scottish Parliament, which has legislative authority over devolved matters in relation to Scotland under the authority of the Scotland Act 1998. Acts are cited by calendar year, in the same fashion as acts of Parliament of the United Kingdom. Each act passed in a respective year is numbered consecutively with Arabic numerals, following the prefix "asp".

7 acts of the Scottish Parliament were passed in 2008.

indicates that an act is available to view at legislation.gov.uk, and indicates the location of the original act in the Parliamentary Archives.

== Acts of the Scottish Parliament ==
{{legislationuk|act |- | {{|Abolition of Bridge Tolls (Scotland) Act 2008|asp|1|24-01-2008|maintained=y|archived=n|An Act of the Scottish Parliament to abolish tolls on road bridges; and for connected purposes.}} |- | {{|Budget (Scotland) Act 2008|asp|2|12-03-2008|maintained=y|archived=n|An Act of the Scottish Parliament to make provision, for financial year 2008/09, for the use of resources by the Scottish Administration and certain bodies whose expenditure is payable out of the Scottish Consolidated Fund, for authorising the payment of sums out of the Fund and for the maximum amounts of borrowing by certain statutory bodies; to make provision, for financial year 2009/10, for authorising the payment of sums out of the Fund on a temporary basis; and for connected purposes.}} |- | {{|Graduate Endowment Abolition (Scotland) Act 2008|asp|3|04-04-2008|maintained=y|archived=n|An Act of the Scottish Parliament to abolish the graduate endowment; and for connected purposes.}} |- | {{|Glasgow Commonwealth Games Act 2008|asp|4|10-06-2008|maintained=y|archived=n|An Act of the Scottish Parliament to make provision in relation to the Commonwealth Games that are to be held principally in Glasgow in 2014.}} |- | {{|Public Health etc. (Scotland) Act 2008|asp|5|16-07-2008|maintained=y|archived=n|An Act of the Scottish Parliament to restate and amend the law on public health; to make provision about mortuaries and the disposal of bodies; to enable the Scottish Ministers to implement their obligations under the International Health Regulations; to make provision relating to the use, sale or hire of sunbeds; to amend the law on statutory nuisances; and for connected purposes.}} |- | {{|Judiciary and Courts (Scotland) Act 2008|asp|6|29-10-2008|maintained=y|archived=n|An Act of the Scottish Parliament to make provision about the judiciary and the courts; to establish the Scottish Court Service; and for connected purposes.}} |- | {{|Scottish Register of Tartans Act 2008|asp|7|13-11-2008|maintained=y|archived=n|An Act of the Scottish Parliament to establish a register of tartans; and for connected purposes.}} }}

== See also ==
- List of acts of the Scottish Parliament
