= Fairhurst (company) =

- Type: Private
- Industry: Multidisciplinary consultancy
- Founded: 1902 (as F.A. MacDonald & Ptrs)
- Headquarters: Glasgow, Scotland
- Key people: Bob McCracken (Chairman)
- Number of employees: 500 (2012)
- Website: Fairhurst website

Fairhurst (formerly F.A. Macdonald & Partners and then W. A. Fairhurst & Partners) is a Scottish engineering consultancy business. It takes its name from William Fairhurst, a notable English bridge designer who led the partnership for 30 years.

== History ==
The business was founded by Frank A. Macdonald in Glasgow in 1902, and initially provided design and construction in ferro-concrete (reinforced concrete) using a system patented by French engineer, François Hennebique. Significant early projects included the Usher Hall in Edinburgh.

William Fairhurst joined the company in 1931, having established his reputation as a civil and structural engineer, and became a director in 1938 and managing director in 1941.

The firm, meanwhile, began to expand its network of offices, both organically and through acquisition, opening Scottish bases in Aberdeen, Edinburgh, Dundee and Elgin, and then English offices in places including Newcastle, Leeds, London (from 1982 to 1997, the company was project manager for the implementation of the engineering infrastructure for the London Docklands Development Corporation) and Bristol. Overseas project offices were also established at various times.

However, a domestic project awarded in 1959, the new Tay Road Bridge, crossing the Tay estuary and linking north-east Fife with Dundee, proved pivotal in the firm's development, and the key involvement of Fairhurst led the business to change its name to W. A. Fairhurst and Partners. Fairhurst retired in 1971, by which time the business had delivered another major Scottish bridge: the Kingston Bridge, Glasgow (1970).

== Today ==
The engineering consultancy today works out of 15 principal offices and employs 500 staff. Today it is one of the largest private consultancy companies in the UK, trading since 1 January 2012 under the name Fairhurst.
