= List of listed buildings in Erskine, Renfrewshire =

This is a list of listed buildings in the parish of Erskine in Renfrewshire, Scotland.

== List ==
| Name | Location | Date Listed | Grid Ref. (Note: Sometimes known as OSGB36, the grid reference (where provided) is based on the British national grid reference system used by the Ordnance Survey. • "Guide to National Grid". Ordnance Survey. • "Get-a-map". Ordnance Survey.) | Geo-coordinates | Notes | LB Number (Note: Historic Environment Scotland assign a unique alphanumeric identifier to each designated site in Scotland, for listed buildings this always begins with "LB", for example "LB12345".) | Image |
|---|---|---|---|---|---|---|---|
| Langbank, Main Street, Woodside Cottages Including Garden Walls And Gatepiers | | | | 55°55′37″N 4°35′49″W | Category B | 43479 | Upload Photo |
| Langbank, Middlepenny Road, St Vincent's College, Chapel | | | | 55°55′32″N 4°35′36″W | Category B | 13631 | Upload Photo |
| Erskine House, Stable Court | | | | 55°55′09″N 4°28′36″W | Category B | 12377 | Upload another image |
| Formakin House, Old Meal Mill Adjoining Bothy Block | | | | 55°54′09″N 4°32′44″W | Category B | 12380 | Upload another image See more images |
| Kennels At Erskine House | | | | 55°55′04″N 4°28′34″W | Category B | 10892 | Upload Photo |
| Ritchieston Cottages | | | | 55°54′53″N 4°30′12″W | Category C(S) | 10899 | Upload Photo |
| Gate-Lodge To Convent Of The Good Shepherd, Greenock Rd., Bishopton | | | | 55°54′30″N 4°29′49″W | Category C(S) | 10902 | Upload Photo |
| Bothy Block With Attached Buildings, Formakin House | | | | 55°54′10″N 4°32′42″W | Category B | 10905 | Upload Photo |
| Langbank, Middlepenny Road, St Vincent's College, Lodge | | | | 55°55′33″N 4°35′38″W | Category C(S) | 13629 | Upload Photo |
| Erskine Hospital Ferry Lodge, By Erskine Ferry | | | | 55°55′02″N 4°27′43″W | Category B | 12375 | Upload another image |
| Blantyre Monument By Freeland, Bishopton | | | | 55°54′57″N 4°29′45″W | Category B | 10889 | Upload Photo |
| Ailsa Lodge (Former Manse) | | | | 55°54′56″N 4°29′08″W | Category C(S) | 10893 | Upload Photo |
| Home Farm Steading A) Main Block B) West Block C) North Block | | | | 55°55′06″N 4°29′41″W | Category B | 10895 | Upload Photo |
| Farm Cottage And Store At Erskine Home Farm | | | | 55°55′02″N 4°29′41″W | Category C(S) | 10896 | Upload Photo |
| Golf Road, Dove Cottage | | | | 55°55′11″N 4°30′19″W | Category B | 10900 | Upload Photo |
| Formakin House, By Bishopton | | | | 55°54′20″N 4°32′43″W | Category A | 10903 | Upload Photo |
| Dargavel House, Royal Ordnance Factory, Bishopton | | | | 55°53′27″N 4°30′25″W | Category B | 10908 | Upload another image |
| Langbank, Middlepenny Road, St Vincent's College, (Former Langbank House) | | | | 55°55′32″N 4°35′33″W | Category B | 13630 | Upload Photo |
| Erskine House, Pigsty At Stables | | | | 55°55′08″N 4°28′34″W | Category B | 12378 | Upload another image |
| Erskine Home Farmhouse | | | | 55°55′05″N 4°29′40″W | Category C(S) | 12379 | Upload Photo |
| South Lodge Of Erskine Hospital, Freeland, Bishopton | | | | 55°54′59″N 4°29′22″W | Category B | 10888 | Upload Photo |
| Old Bishopton House, Portion Of Convent Of The Good Shepherd, Greenock Road, Bishopton | | | | 55°55′13″N 4°31′51″W | Category B | 10901 | Upload Photo |
| Bishopton, Mar Hall Drive, Mar Hall Hotel (Former Portion Of Erskine Hospital, Formerly Erskine House) | | | | 55°55′15″N 4°28′44″W | Category A | 10909 | Upload another image See more images |
| House At Kennels, Erskine House | | | | 55°55′04″N 4°28′33″W | Category B | 10891 | Upload Photo |
| Kirkton Cottages, Freeland, By Bishopton | | | | 55°54′53″N 4°29′16″W | Category B | 10894 | Upload Photo |
| Offices At Freelands House | | | | 55°55′09″N 4°29′42″W | Category C(S) | 10898 | Upload Photo |
| Main Entrance Gateway & Lodge, Formakin House | | | | 55°54′21″N 4°32′41″W | Category B | 10904 | Upload Photo |
| Cottage At Walled Garden, Erskine House | | | | 55°54′59″N 4°29′22″W | Category B | 10890 | Upload Photo |
| Gleddoch House, By Langbank | | | | 55°55′06″N 4°35′06″W | Category B | 10906 | Upload Photo |
| East Lodge Of Finlaystone House, By Langbank | | | | 55°55′38″N 4°36′14″W | Category B | 10907 | Upload another image |
| Erskine Parish Church, Freeland By Bishoptown | | | | 55°54′58″N 4°29′14″W | Category B | 10910 | Upload Photo |
| Bishopton, Rossland Church Of Scotland | | | | 55°54′36″N 4°30′44″W | Category C(S) | 12376 | Upload Photo |
| Freelands House | | | | 55°55′10″N 4°29′42″W | Category B | 10897 | Upload Photo |

== Key ==
The scheme for classifying buildings in Scotland is:

- Category A: "buildings of national or international importance, either architectural or historic; or fine, little-altered examples of some particular period, style or building type."
- Category B: "buildings of regional or more than local importance; or major examples of some particular period, style or building type, which may have been altered."
- Category C: "buildings of local importance; lesser examples of any period, style, or building type, as originally constructed or moderately altered; and simple traditional buildings which group well with other listed buildings."

In March 2016 there were 47,288 listed buildings in Scotland. Of these, 8% were Category A, and 50% were Category B, with the remaining 42% being Category C.
