= Blantyre Monument =

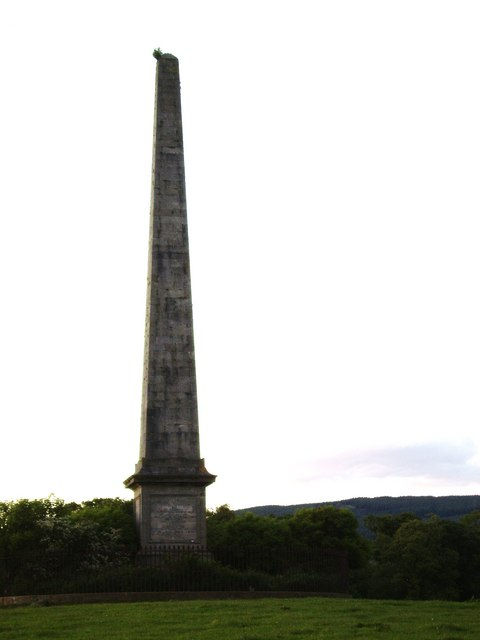
- Interactive map of Blantyre Monument
- Location: Erskine, Renfrewshire
- Coordinates: 55°54′57″N 4°29′45″W
- Designer: William Burn
- Type: Obelisk
- Material: Stone
- Height: 80 ft (24 m)
- Completion date: c.1825
- Dedicated to: Robert Walter Stuart

Blantyre Monument is a commemorative stone in Erskine, Renfrewshire. The monument is in the obelisk style. It is situated adjacent to the B815 road; in a field on the border with Bishopton.

== History ==
The monument was built to commemorate the bravery of Robert Walter Stuart, the 11th Lord Blantyre, who lived at nearby Erskine House (now Mar Hall). He was a Major-General in the British Army and served in the Napoleonic Wars with the Duke of Wellington. He was killed accidentally by a stray bullet in a street fight in Brussels in 1830. The monument was planned by friends who held him in high esteem. William Burn was the designer. It was constructed in c.1825 and became a category B listed monument on 27 June 1980.

== Inscription ==
The following passage is inscribed on the monument:

Erected by the county of Renfrew
to the memory of the right honorable
Robert Walter 11th Lord Blantyre

A Major-General in the British Army
and formerly Lord Lieutenant of
Renfrewshire

In testimony of respect for his
public services and as a tribute
of esteem of his private worth

== See also ==
- Robert Stuart, 11th Lord Blantyre
- List of listed buildings in Erskine, Renfrewshire
