= Mar Hall =

Earl of Mar Hotel
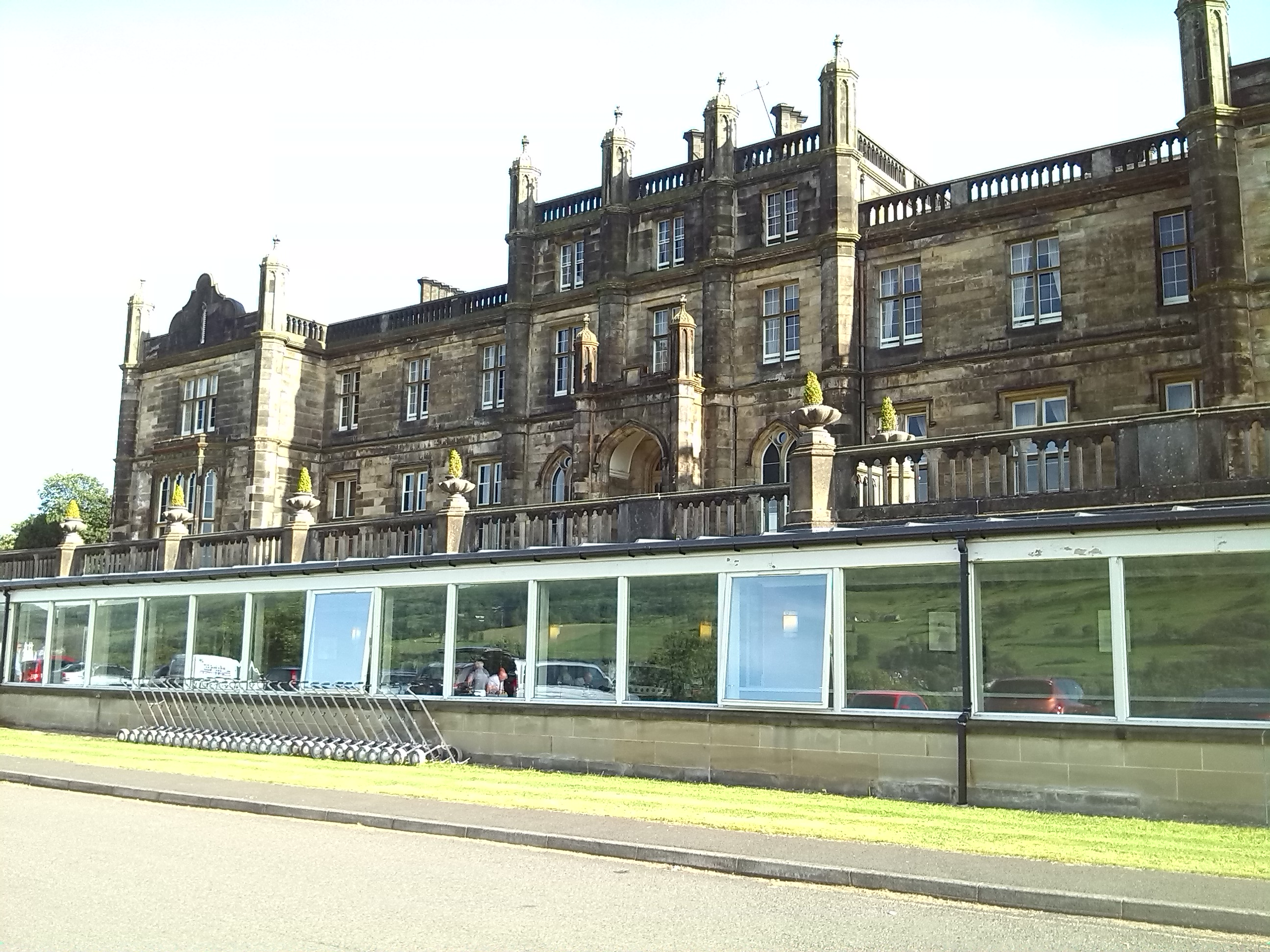
- Interactive map of the Earl of Mar Hotel area
- Former names: Erskine House
- Alternative names: Mar Hall

General information
- Status: open
- Type: Baronial Mansion
- Architectural style: Gothic
- Location: Earl of Mar Estate, Mar Hall Avenue, Bishopton, Scotland
- Coordinates: 55°55′15″N 4°28′43″W
- Construction started: 1828
- Completed: 1845
- Cost: £50,000
- Renovation cost: £15M for hotel conversion
- Affiliation: Erskine Hospital

Technical details
- Floor count: 3
- Lifts/elevators: 1
- Grounds: 240 acres (100 ha)

Design and construction
- Architect: Sir Robert Smirke
- Awards: TripAdvisor Travellers' Choice Luxury Hotel Award

Other information
- Number of rooms: 53
- Number of restaurants: 2
- Number of bars: 1
- Facilities: gym, spa, swimming pool, conference suites, 18 hole golf course, wedding facilities, free wi-fi
- Parking: available

Website
- http://www.marhall.com/

Mar Hall is a 5-star hotel and golf resort in Bishopton, Renfrewshire. It is situated in Erskine House, a category A listed building. Formerly the building was the Erskine Hospital.

== History ==
The Lords Blantyre came into ownership of the Erskine Estate and Erskine House during the early 18th century. In 1828 Major General Robert Walter Stuart, the 11th Lord Blantyre commissioned the present house. The latest Erskine House was constructed between 1828 and 1845 at a cost of £50,000. It was designed by Sir Robert Smirke, the architect of the British Museum. Sir Charles Barry designed the fountain & garden lay-out. A nearby quarry (now disused) provided the stone required for construction. The oak interior was imported from Quebec, Canada. The building lay empty as the peerage of the Lords Blantyre ended in 1900. It was then renovated and opened as the Princess Louise Scottish Hospital for Limbless Sailors and Soldiers in 1916. This was to treat soldiers returning from the First World War. A nearby monument commemorates the original owner of Erskine House. It is called Blantyre Monument.

== Hotel ==
A £15m re-fit converted the building into a 5-star hotel which opened in 2004. The official name of the hotel is Earl of Mar; however, locally it is known as Mar Hall. The name recalls the Erskine Estate's former ownership by the Earl of Mar. The hotel has a swimming pool, gym and 18-hole golf course which hosts Pro-Am tournaments throughout the year.

The hotel was the winner of a TripAdvisor Travellers' Choice Luxury Hotels Award in 2012. Numerous celebrities and well known sports teams have stayed at the hotel, including Kylie Minogue, One Direction, Harry Styles, Neil Diamond, Rangers FC, Scotland men's national football team, Katy Perry, Robbie Williams, Beyoncé, Coldplay, Oasis, Take That, Bob Dylan, Mike Tyson, Marisa Tomei and Brad Pitt.

== Gallery ==
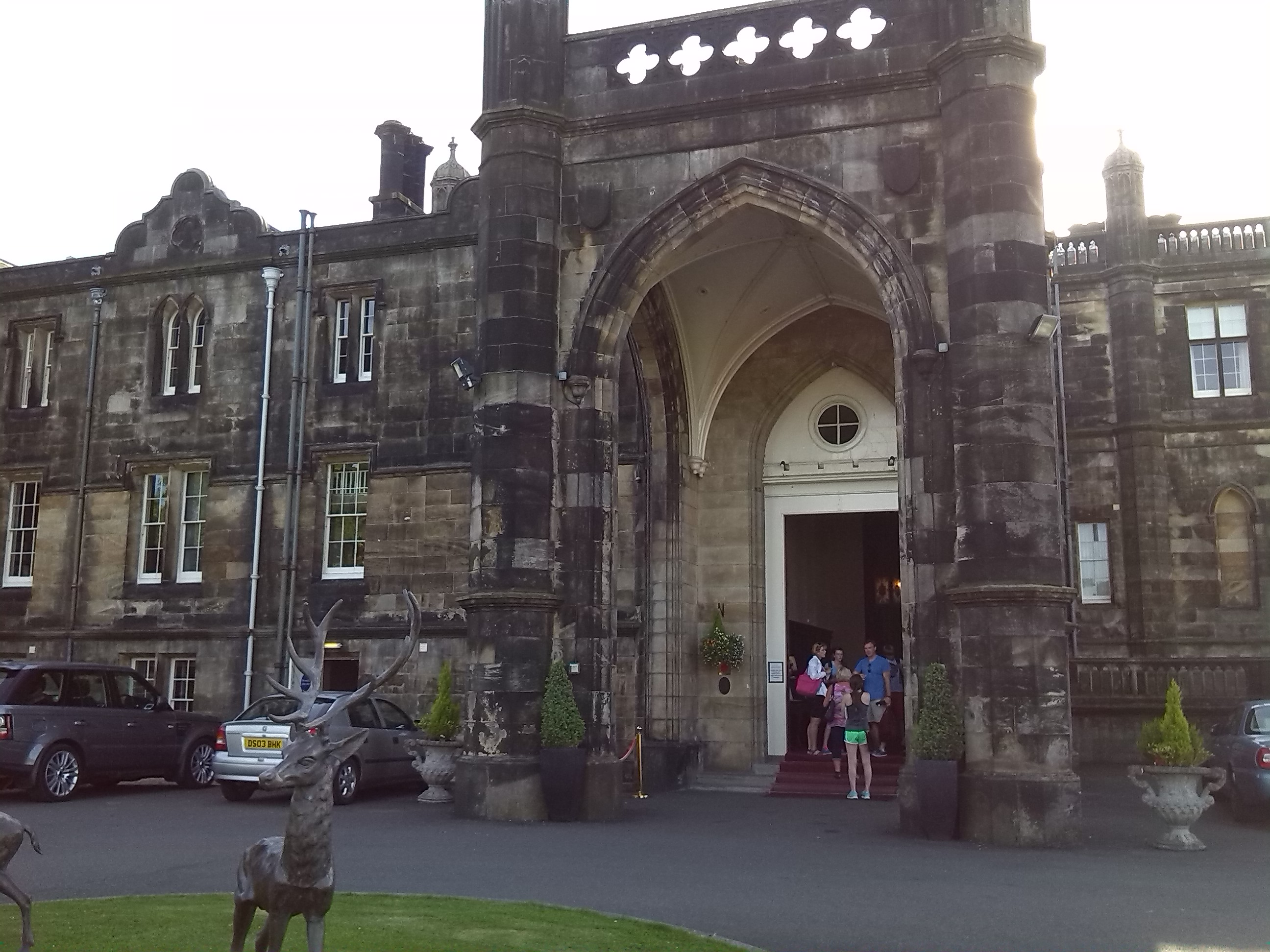
Entrance door

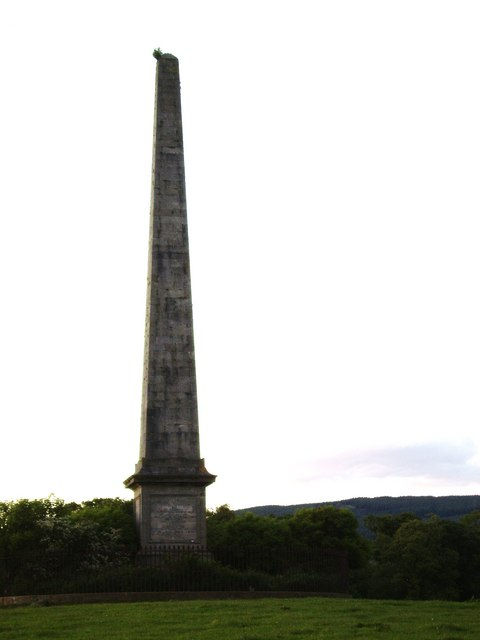
Blantyre Monument

== See also ==
- List of Category A listed buildings in Renfrewshire
- List of listed buildings in Erskine, Renfrewshire
