= Erskine Veterans Charity =

Erskine
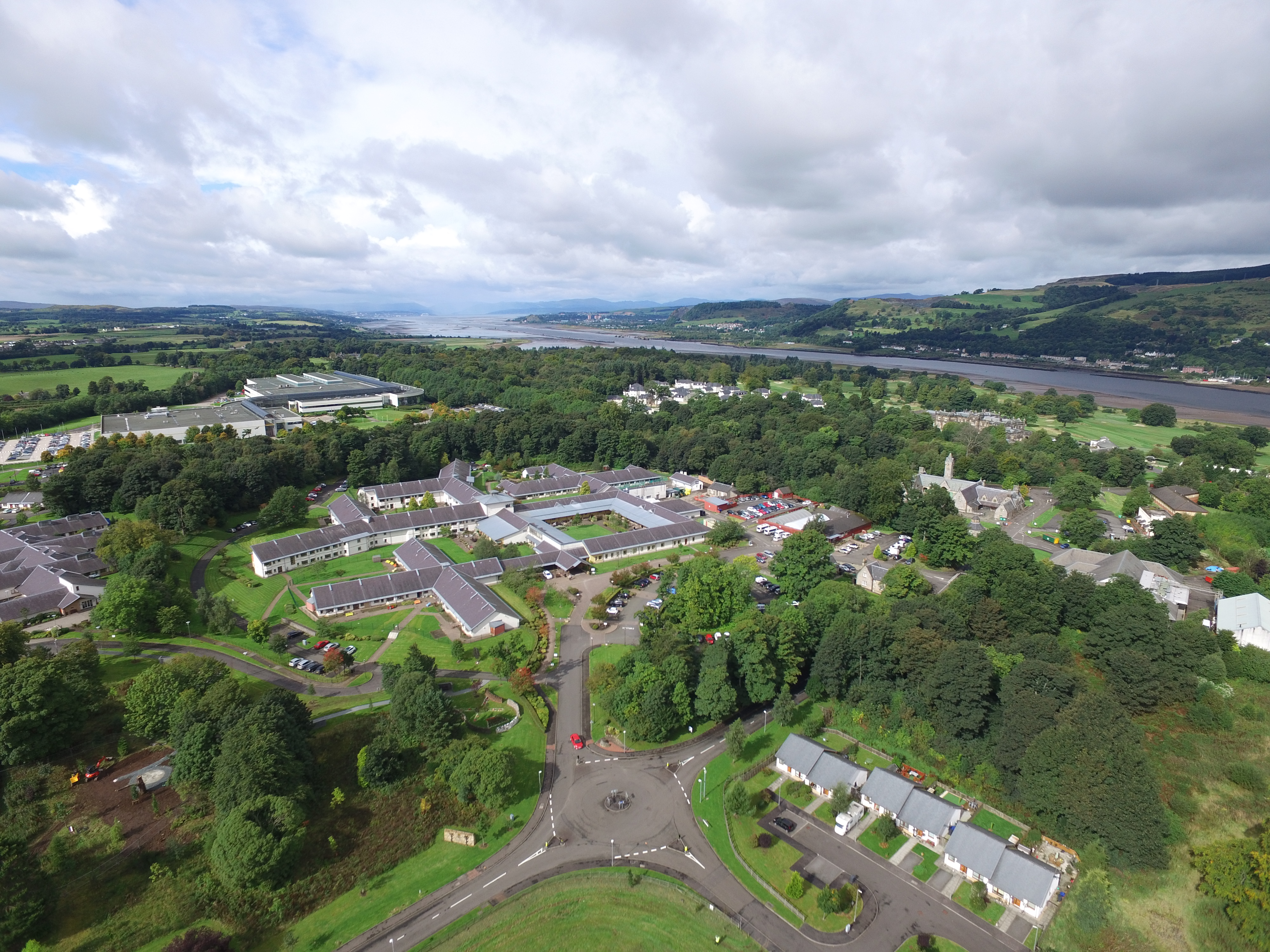
- Erskine Home

Geography
- Location: Erskine, Scotland
- Coordinates: 55°55′02″N 4°28′40″W

Organisation
- Care system: Private
- Type: Veterans hospital
- Patron: The King

History
- Founded: 1916

Links
- Website: erskine.org.uk

Erskine Veterans Charity, commonly known as just Erskine, is a veterans care and support non-profit organisation headquartered in Erskine, Renfrewshire, but operating across the Central Belt of Scotland and in Moray. It provides a range of services to British Armed Forces, veterans of all ages and their families, who live in Scotland. It is most renowned for its long-term nursing, dementia and end-of-life medical care, as well as a growing range of support services. It supports veterans through two care homes in Bishopton nr Glasgow and Edinburgh, and a Veterans Village, comprising 44 cottages, a Veterans Activity Centre (EVAC W), five assisted living apartments and 23 "Transitional Support apartments" (TSA) for service-leavers and working-age veterans. A second Erskine Veterans Activity Centre (EVAC N) opened in Forres nr Inverness in late 2024. Additionally, Erskine now offers a "Support at Home" service in limited areas of Scotland. The charity first established itself as Princess Louise Scottish Hospital for Limbless Sailors and Soldiers in 1916. It was created through Scotland's compassionate response to her sons returning physically and mentally shattered by the horrors of trench and naval warfare in the First World War. Its name was then shortened to Erskine Hospital and then simply "Erskine" in later years. The charity has gone on to offer help to British veterans of every subsequent war and become the foremost veterans charity in the country.

== History ==
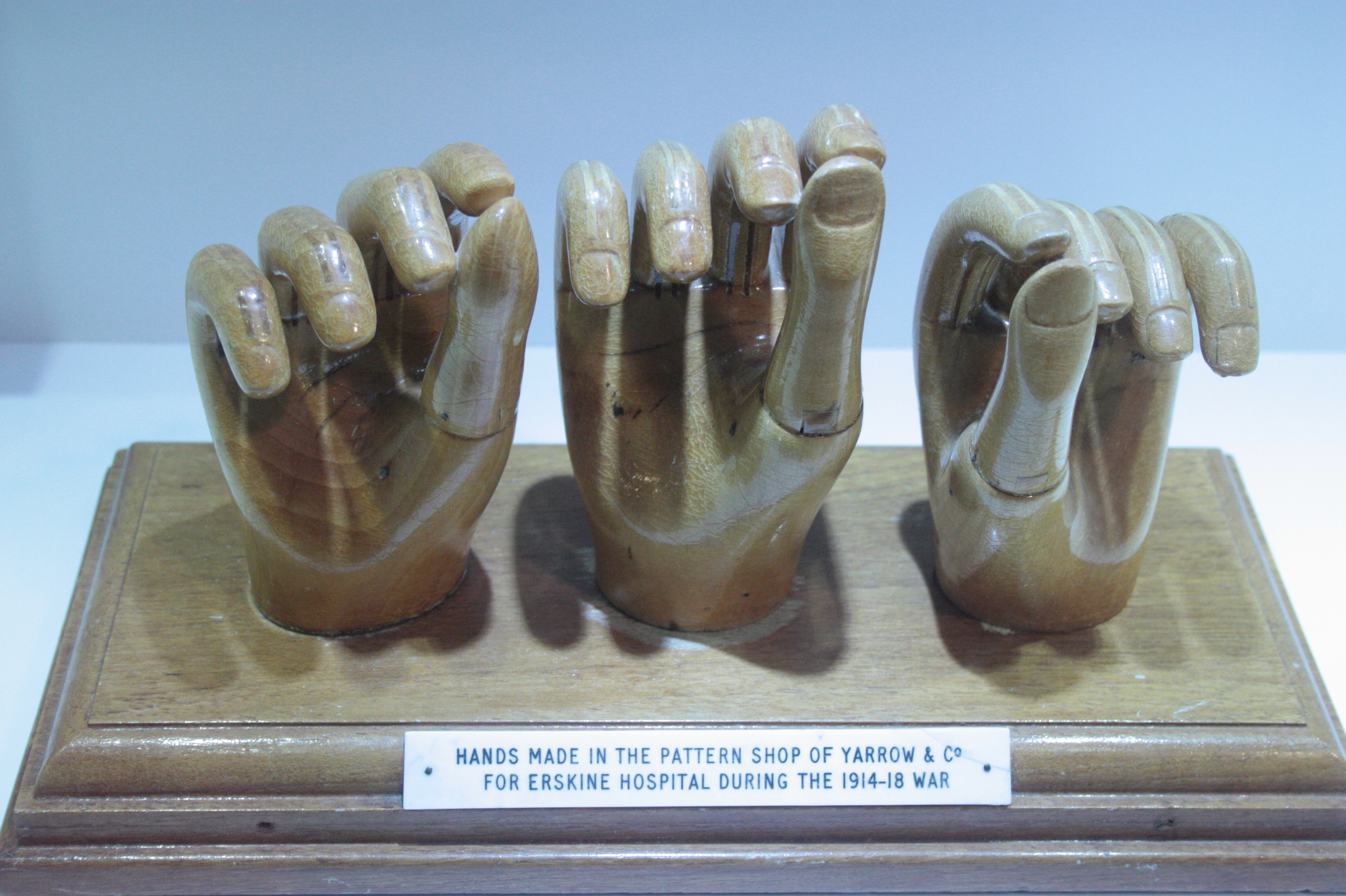
Artificial hands made for Erskine Hospital 1918, Hunterian Museum, Glasgow

A need for a dedicated war hospital was apparent during the First World War, as hospitals were struggling to keep up with the demands of the many limbless soldiers and sailors returning from war. It was then thought that Scotland should have a large, modern war hospital to cope with these types of injuries. A charitable committee was formed after a meeting in Glasgow. Sir William Macewen, a chief surgeon, was at the forefront of pushing through the need for such a facility. He met with Sir Thomas Dunlop the Lord Provost of Glasgow, who was enthusiastic.

The next stage was to find a location for the hospital in the west of Scotland. After reviewing several sites it was decided that Erskine would be the location. Thomas Aikman, the owner of Erskine House, which is a mansion on the banks of the River Clyde, offered free use of his mansion and gardens for the period of the war and for 12 months after it was declared over. Then Sir John Reid, a charity committee member, bought the mansion house and gardens and gifted them to the charity. Princess Louise, Duchess of Argyll agreed to become the patron of the hospital and within a few weeks the Scottish public had donated £100,000 towards the facility.

Agnes Carnochan Douglas was the first matron at Erskine. She began her nursing career at the Western Infirmary, Glasgow where she worked with Sir William Macewen. Macewen offered her the position of Matron at Erskine House. She started on 28 April 1916, first at Culzean Castle where patients were admitted while Erskine House was being transformed into a hospital. She spent six months travelling between Culzean and Erskine. Her role included patient care, recruiting staff, advising the hospitals Committees on issues such as furniture and equipment, and liaising with the War Office.

The hospital was opened on 10 October 1916 and had an official opening on 6 June 1917 with Princess Louise making an appearance.

== Expansion ==
Erskine's role has since expanded to meet the changing needs of war veterans. It now cares for any ex-service people and their spouses, who might be facing the challenges of long-term or degenerative health conditions. It also provides convalescent care for those recovering from illness - and provides hotel and support services for the Army's Personnel recovery Centre, at its Gilmerton Home in Edinburgh.

By 1980, there were new departments available for ex-service people. These included a social work and speech therapy department. Erskine House, which was the original hospital building, needed extensive work to continue as a working hospital. The building was sold as part of the vision to modernize Erskine. It was then turned into a 5-star hotel called the Earl of Mar, later known as Mar Hall. It opened in 2004.

In 2021, Erskine completed the build of 24 apartments on the Bishopton Estate, designed to support single ex-service men and women as they transitioned back into civilian life. The apartments offer social, recreational and training facilities to help residents transition into full time employment and long-term accommodation.

The current CEO is Wing Commander Ian Cumming MBE. The CEO is responsible for leading Erskine as it enhances its efficiency and profile, whilst expanding its services and outputs - as a centre of excellence in Veterans' care & holistic support across Scotland.

=== Erskine Home ===
In 2000-01, the charity moved to two new purpose built sites in the town of Erskine. The Erskine Home was opened in 2000. The new flagship building replaced the original hospital building and is situated on grounds by the Erskine Bridge. This centre cost £16m and provides nursing and dementia care on a long term and respite basis. It has 180 beds available and is the biggest unit the charity has. King Charles III, as Prince of Wales, the charity's patron, opened the unit and unveiled a stone plaque to commemorate the opening.

=== Erskine Park Home ===
The Erskine Park Home opened in 2006, and closed in 2024, as part of a strategic review. It offered care for 40 residents and specialised in dementia care. Staff and residents moved into the larger Erskine Home at this point. The building is anticipated to become a veterans sheltered housing community complex.

=== Erskine Edinburgh Home ===
The Erskine Edinburgh Home was opened in 2001. It is situated in Gilmerton and has capacity for 40 residents and additionally provides hotel accommodation and support to younger Service people passing through the British Army Personnel Recovery Centre. Other significant lodgers within this campus include Combat Stress (charitable organisation) and NHS Scotland's "Veterans 1st Point". The Edinburgh Home was the charity's first unit outside the Erskine area. This was also opened by the Princess Royal.

=== Erskine Glasgow Home ===
The Erskine Glasgow Home was opened by the Princess Royal in 2007. It was situated in Anniesland and had space for 46 residents. It closed in late 2022.

=== Veterans' Family Accommodation ===
Erskine has also built 44 veterans' cottages within the old hospital grounds at Erskine to house ex-service members and their families. It recently completed building 5 assisted living apartments for elderly veterans who seek to remain independent but close to expert staff. In 2021, Erskine completed a 24 apartment "Transitional Support Service" for younger Veterans and Service-leavers who lack a home or employment upon leaving the Services, or shortly afterward.

=== Erskine Reid Macewen Activities Centre (Now EVAC W - Erskine Veterans Activity Centre - West) ===
This unit was first opened as a training and conference facility. It now offers "psychosocial support" via meaningful training, recreational and community activities for more than 300 Veterans on the West Coast, who would otherwise be faced by social isolation and loneliness. It is housed within the historic stable building at the charity's HQ within the Bishopton Estate. It is jointly named after Sir John Reid, who gifted the mansion and gardens to the charity, and Sir William Macewen, the surgeon who pushed through the need for the hospital. As the building is Category B listed, the charity collaborated with Historic Scotland and the Heritage Lottery Fund on the renovation. It was officially opened in June 2001 by Wendy Alexander MSP.

=== Erskine Transitional Support Accommodation (ETSA) ===
The David Boyle Court facility supports Veterans who have encountered difficulties in transition from Military service to civilian life. It offers them a safe place to live for up to two years, where they can learn job skills, access support services, enjoy Erskine's leading activity centre - ERMAC, and meet others in the same position.

The Transitional Support Accommodation David Boyle Court, based within Erskine’s Veterans Village in Bishopton, features 24 single occupancy apartments that come fully furnished, complete with living and dining spaces, kitchen, bedroom, and an en-suite wet room. There are also four fully accessible apartments. The new facility features two communal spaces which are used for training, one-to-one counselling and skills development. One of these spaces can also be used as a cinema room.

=== Erskine Veterans Activities Centre - North (EVAC North) ===
In order to help Veterans live well within their communities across Scotland, Erskine is replicating ERMAC in several locations. EVAC North opened in December 2024, from the former Victoria Hotel in Forres town centre. It is actively delivering support to more than 500 Veterans across Morayshire and beyond.

== Funding ==
Erskine is first and foremost a charity. Local Authorities make a contribution to its operating costs of caring for their elderly citizens. However, Erskine must fundraise around £10M a year, to achieve the outstanding levels of care, support and meaningful community activities, which the charity believes Veterans deserve. It does this independently and receives no funding from the Earl Haig Fund (Poppyscotland) or the Poppy Appeal. Fundraising schemes are active throughout the year and in 2017, Erskine was rated as Scotland's most effective fundraising charity by Civil Society Magazine. 92% of its expenditure is care and/or care-support related. The charity hosts many events including an annual motorbike meet and Military Ball. Veterans also partake in various entertainment, physical, art and craft activities on a daily basis in "The Bunker". The charity will accept the help of volunteers from the public.

== Artificial limbs ==
There was a huge influx of injured military personnel returning from the First World War with missing limbs due to the fighting. Britain at this time was wholly dependent on foreign imports of artificial limbs. Sir William Macewen, the chief surgeon at the hospital, thought that this was intolerable. A dispensary and operating theatre were fitted out as workshops making artificial limbs. Macewen also enlisted the help of a local shipbuilding company called Yarrow Shipbuilders. The company not only lent their yard but chose to have some of their best craftsmen working on the design and construction of the limbs. McEwan and Yarrows subsequently designed a new concept artificial limb known as the Erskine Artificial Limb. By December 1917 the hospital had treated 1,613 patients and of that number 1,126 required a new limb. And by 1920, there had been 9,500 artificial limbs fitted. Most of these were manufactured at the hospital’s workshops.

== Listed buildings ==
The original hospital building is called Erskine House and is a Category A listed building. It is now the Mar Hall Hotel. There is a piggery, a stables yard and some other small buildings which also have listed status.

== Gallery ==
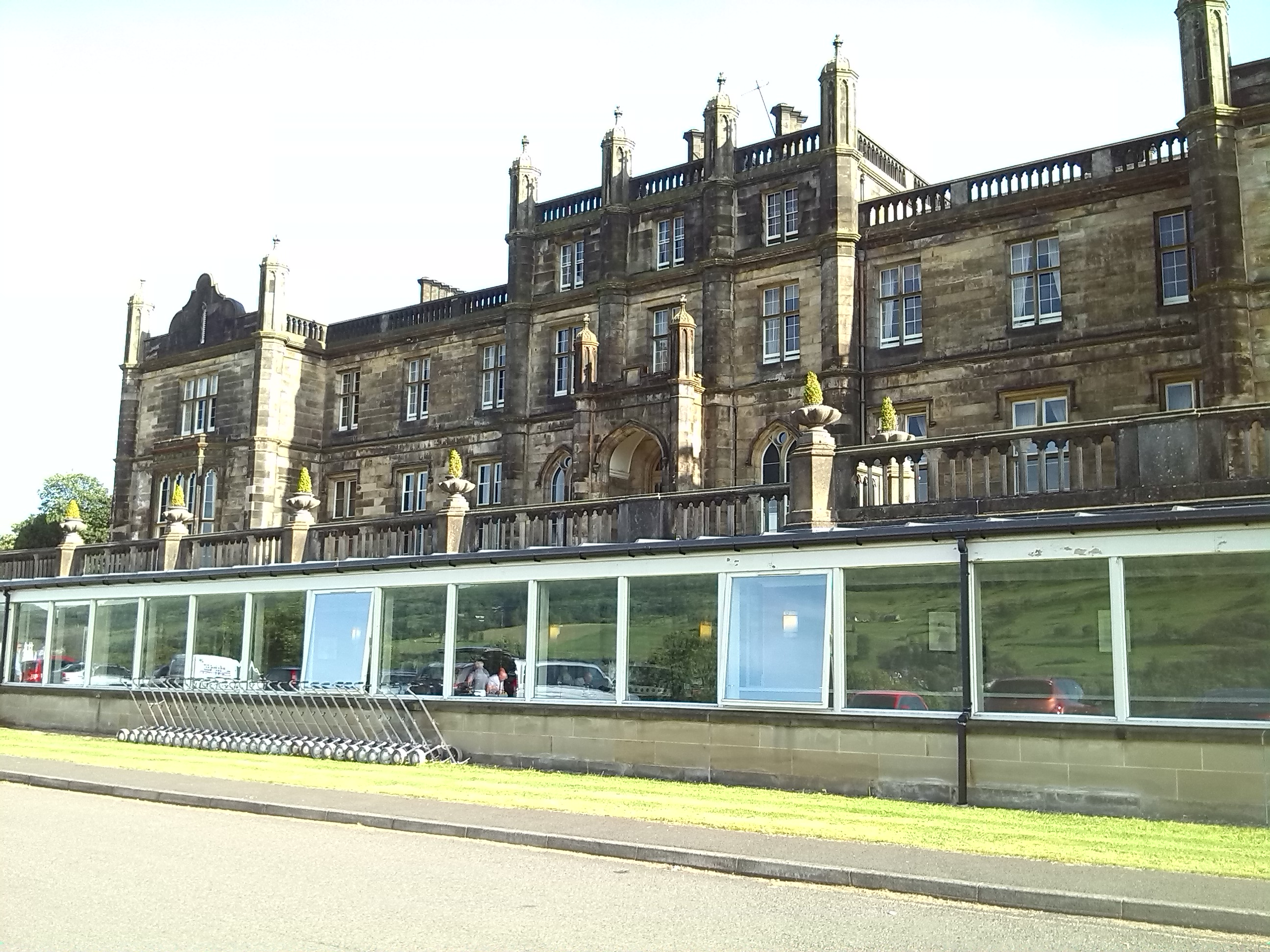
Erskine House which was the site of the original hospital. It is now the Mar Hall Hotel.

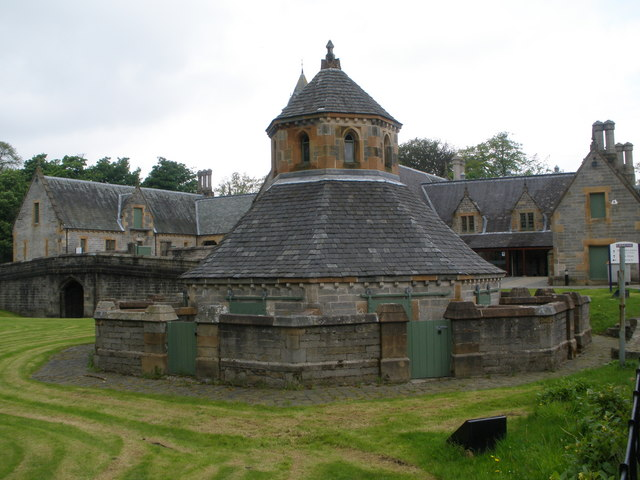
The Category B listed Piggery building and Stables yard.

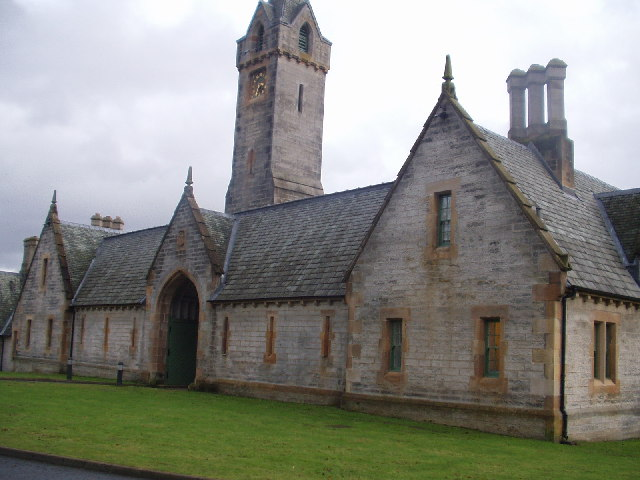
Erskine Reid McEwen Veterans Activity Centre, which is also a Category B listed building.

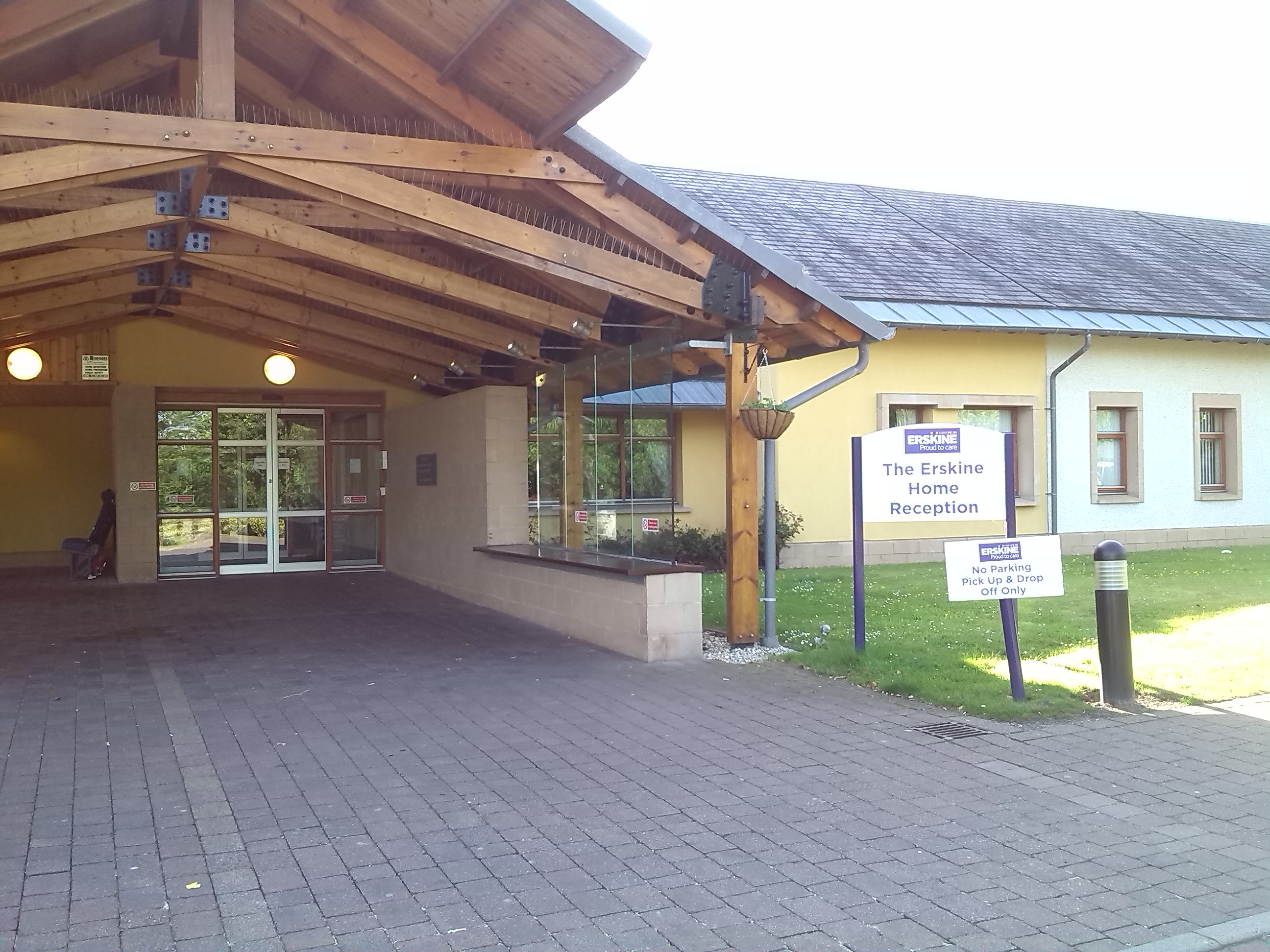
Erskine Home Bishopton - The charity's Head Office
