= Lamont Farm =

City farm in Renfrewshire, Scotland

Lamont Farm Project
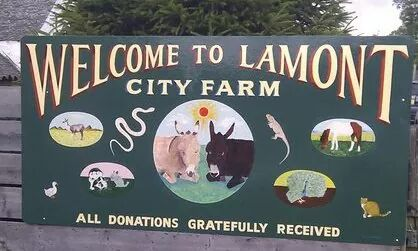
- Interactive map of the Lamont Farm Project area

General information
- Status: Open
- Location: Barhill Road, Erskine, PA8 6BX, Renfrewshire, Scotland
- Coordinates: 55°53′52″N 4°27′36″W
- Inaugurated: 1979

Technical details
- Grounds: (5 acres)

Other information
- Parking: Limited

Lamont Farm Project is based in Erskine, Renfrewshire. It is a city farm which is open to the public.

== History ==
Lamont Farm Project was founded in 1977 and opened in 1979 by local man Charlie Doran. The farm is a registered charity and is Scotland's first city farm. It is home to domesticated animals including llamas, sheep, pigs, horses, ponies, donkeys, ducks, rabbits, ferrets and other small furry animals and cats. The farm also has a small reptile enclosure for snakes, iguanas, terrapins and spiders.

== Charity ==
As the farm is a charity it depends on donations from the general public. Fundraising schemes are active throughout the year. Events like 'Be a farmer for a day', 'Sponsor an animal', 'Pony care', 'Annual Open Days' and 'Doors open weekend' are some of the fundraising initiatives in place. Volunteer workers handle the day-to-day care and feeding of the animals. Many of the local schools in the area visit the farm because of its educational value.

== Gallery ==
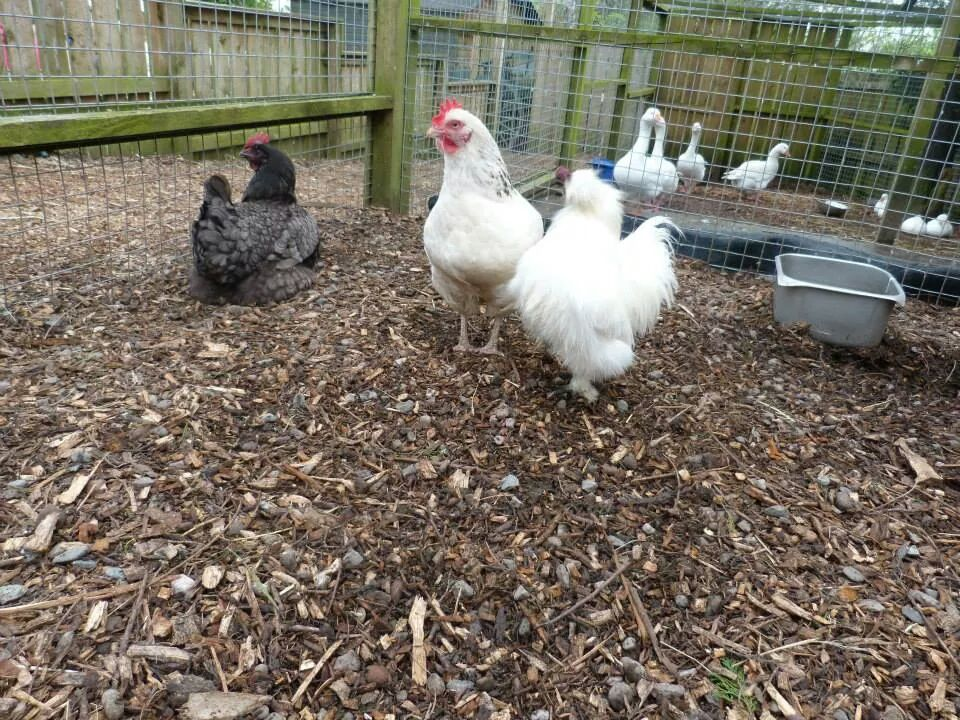
Bird enclosure at the farm

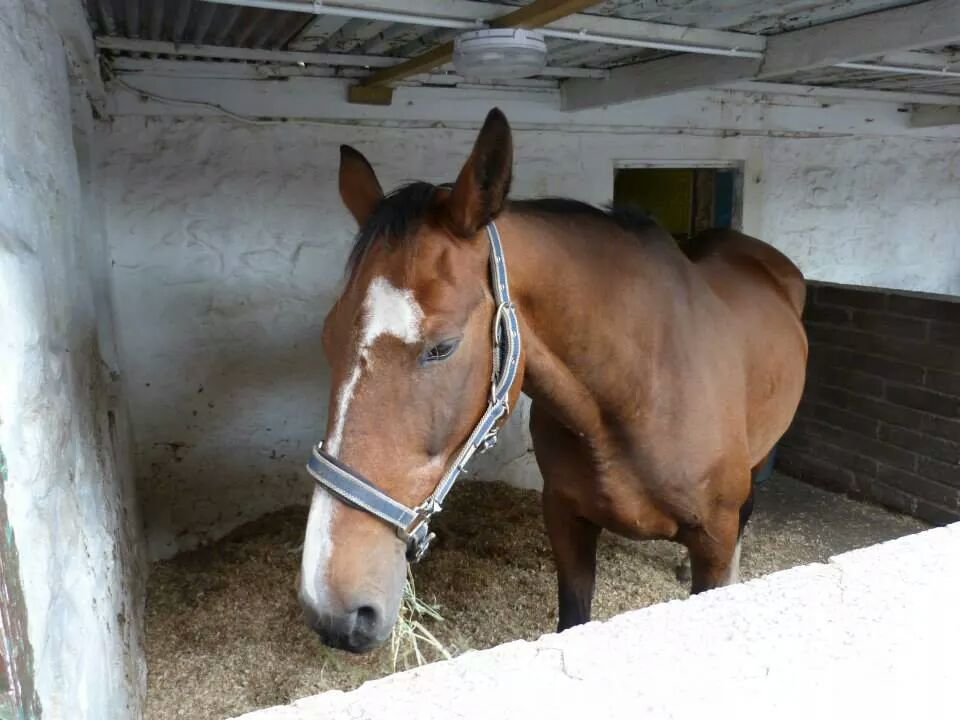
One of the many horses at the farm

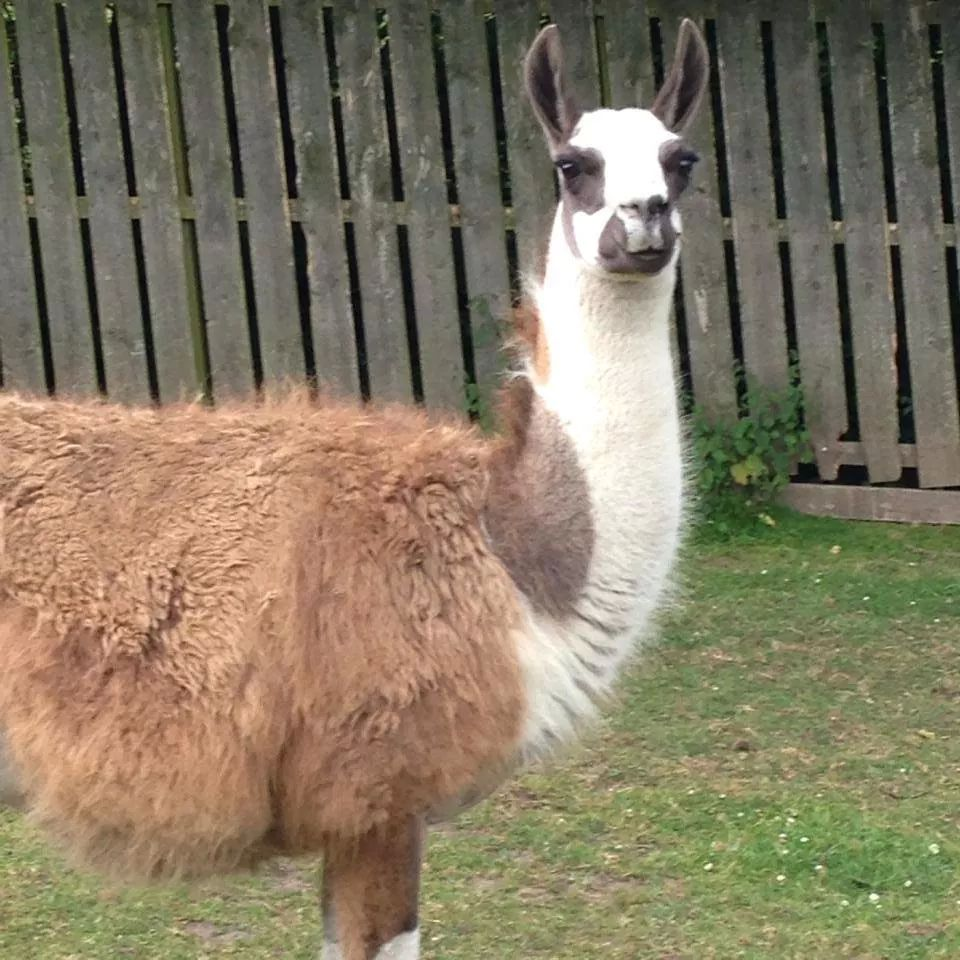
One of the three llamas at the farm
