= Erskine, Renfrewshire =

Town in Renfrewshire, Scotland

Coordinates: 55°54′29″N 4°27′50″W

Erskine: Scottish Gaelic: Arasgain; Scots: Erskin
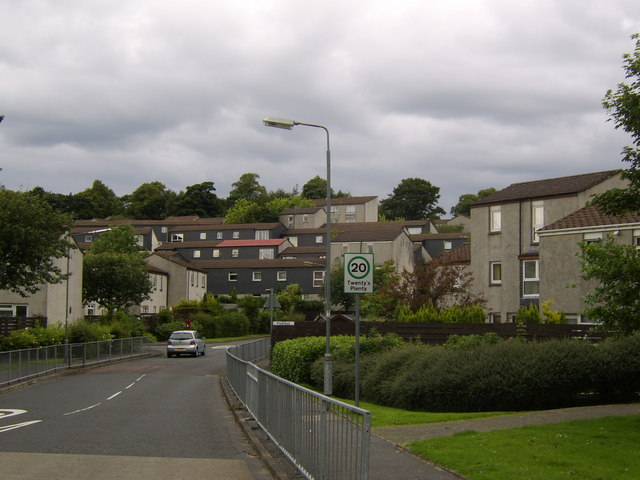
- Parksail

- Location within Renfrewshire
- Population: 15,010 (2020)
- OS grid reference: NS460667
- Council area: Renfrewshire
- Lieutenancy area: Renfrewshire
- Country: Scotland
- Sovereign state: United Kingdom
- Post town: ERSKINE
- Postcode district: PA8
- Dialling code: 0141
- Police: Scotland
- Fire: Scottish
- Ambulance: Scottish
- UK Parliament: Paisley and Renfrewshire North
- Scottish Parliament: Renfrewshire North and West

Erskine (/ˈɜːrskɪn/, Scots: Erskin, Scottish Gaelic: Arasgain) is a town in the council area of Renfrewshire, and historic county of the same name, situated in the West Central Lowlands of Scotland. It lies on the southern bank of the River Clyde, providing the lowest crossing to the north bank of the river at the Erskine Bridge, connecting the town to Old Kilpatrick in West Dunbartonshire. Erskine is a commuter town at the western extent of the Greater Glasgow conurbation, bordering Bishopton to the west and Renfrew, Inchinnan, Paisley and Glasgow Airport to the south. Originally a small village settlement, the town has expanded since the 1960s as the site of development as an overspill town, boosting the population to over 15,000. In 2014, it was rated one of the most attractive postcode areas to live in Scotland.

== History ==
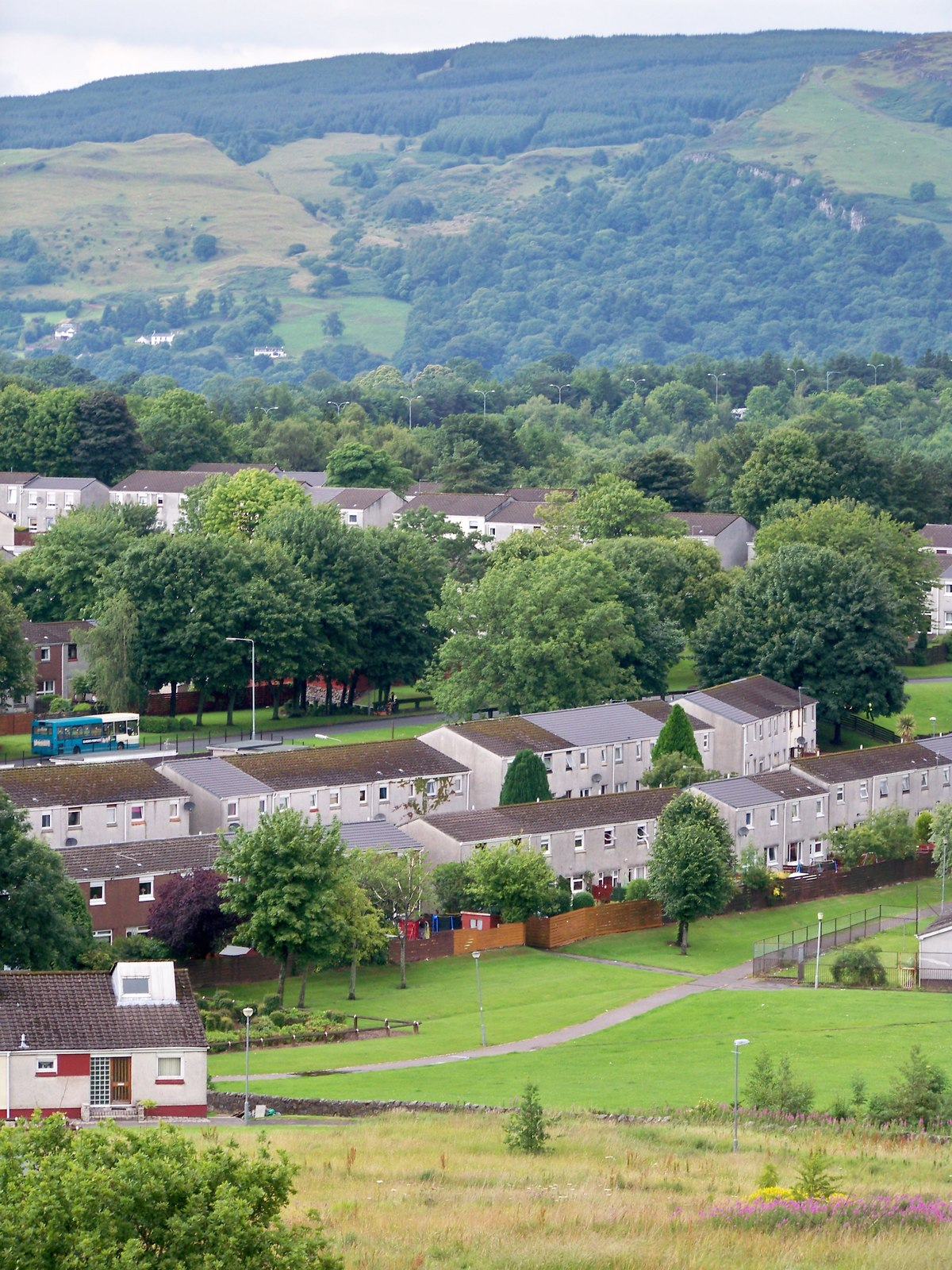
Bargarran

Archaeological evidence states that agricultural activity took place within the area as far back as 3000 BC and it has been inhabited by humans since 1000 BC. The first recorded mention of Erskine is at the confirmation of the church of Erskine in 1207 by Florentius, Bishop of Glasgow. The land around the town was first part of the estate of Henry de Erskine in the 13th century. Sir John Hamilton of Orbiston held the estate in the 17th century until 1703 when it was acquired by the Lords Blantyre. By 1782 there were twelve houses and a church in Erskine. A new church was then built which is still in use today. An influx of workmen moved to the area during 1836-41 due to the construction of the Inverclyde railway line. In 1900 it passed into the ownership of William Arthur Baird, who inherited it from his grandfather, Charles Stuart, 12th Lord Blantyre.

In the late 18th century, the town of Erskine was a hamlet. During this time, stone quays were constructed to support the Erskine Ferry to Old Kilpatrick and Dunbartonshire. This replaced the river ford which had been in place since medieval times. In light of increased industry and infrastructure in the surrounding area, it gradually became a village in the following century. The small church community grew to having 3,000 residents in 1961, when Renfrewshire County Council unveiled its "New Community" plan for the town's development which involved the Scottish Special Housing Association.

The development began in 1971 with the building of both privately owned and rented accommodation which boosted the town's population by around 10,000. Having established itself as a thriving commuter town, the 1990s saw the building of larger and more expensive housing, aimed at more affluent property buyers. Due to apprehension about further expansion of the town, several proposals for further large housing developments have been rejected. This is largely because the town has only one secondary school.

In December 2025 it was announced that a new civic plaza, garden and events space was to be created in Erskine. The space will make use vacant land at Erskine Sports Centre and will include:

- Recreational green space and garden
- Additional walking routes
- Play equipment
- Infrastructure to support a Christmas Tree

The project began construction in January 2026 and is due to be completed in summer 2026.The project is jointly funded by Renfrewshire council, the UK Government’s Shared Prosperity Fund and the Scottish Government’s Place Based Investment Programme.

== Geography ==
The town expanded in the 1970s with the construction of housing association stock. Since that decade, considerable private housing developments have continued. As more private houses were built in the 1980s, Erskine started to become an attractive place to live due to location factors and accessibility to main roads and the M8 Motorway. Due to this there was a major boom in property development in the 80s and 90s. Most ex-and existing housing association stock are found in the Bargarran, North Barr and Park Mains areas of the town. Private housing is mostly found in the west part of the town, e.g. Garnieland, Flures Drive, Hawthorn, Parkvale, Parkinch, St. Annes, West Freelands.

Decade	Area	Type	Example
1970s	Bargarran, North Barr, Park Mains	Council Stock	Sempill Avenue, Rashieburn, Mains Hill
1980s	Linburn, Millfield, West Freelands	Private Estate	Ryat Linn, Millfield Hill, Turnhill Drive
1990s	Garnieland, Parkvale, St. Annes	Private Estate	Parkinch, Garnie Avenue, Mainscroft
2000s	South Barr, Barholm	Private Estate & Council Stock	Umachan, Barwood Drive, Barholm Crescent

The town borders a number of nearby settlements, some separated by a rural hinterland.

== Economy ==
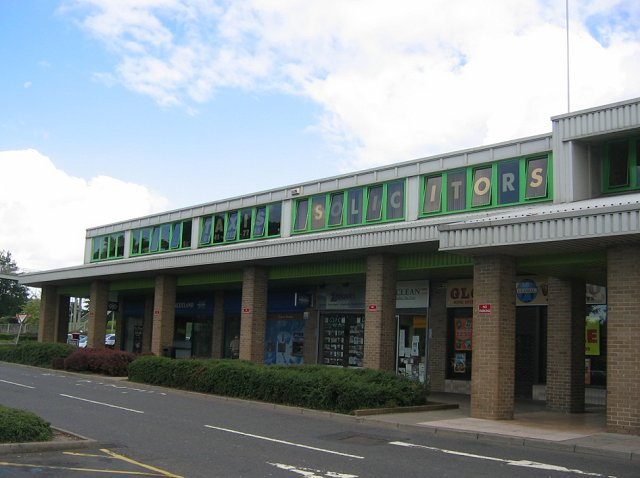
Bridgewater Centre

The town's Bridgewater complex provides a range of tertiary sector businesses, chiefly retail and leisure facilities. These include supermarkets, a tanning salon, a dental surgery, a bakery, a butcher, a fish & chip shop, takeouts, a pub with dining area, a Chinese restaurant, an optician, a chemist, a doctors surgery, hardware store, a hair salon, an estate agency, a dry-cleaners and key cutting service, a swimming pool, a funeral directors, a bank and a public library.There are also smaller retail areas in the Bargarran, Mains Drive and Park Glade areas, where there are a few shops and restaurants as well as a community centre.

On the riverside, there is an office block which is home to a logistic company. The Erskine Bridge Hotel is also situated on the banks of the Clyde. A few hundred yards up river is the Pandamonium Play Centre. There are 2 private golf clubs in Erskine. The Erskine Golf Club, which is located on the border between Erskine and Bishopton. And also the Mar Hall Hotel and Golf Course which is less than 1 mile (1.6 km) away.

In addition to a number of local playing fields, the area has two other relatively new sporting facilities: the Erskine Community Sports Centre and the Astroturf at Park Mains High School.

== Landmarks ==
=== Erskine Bridge ===
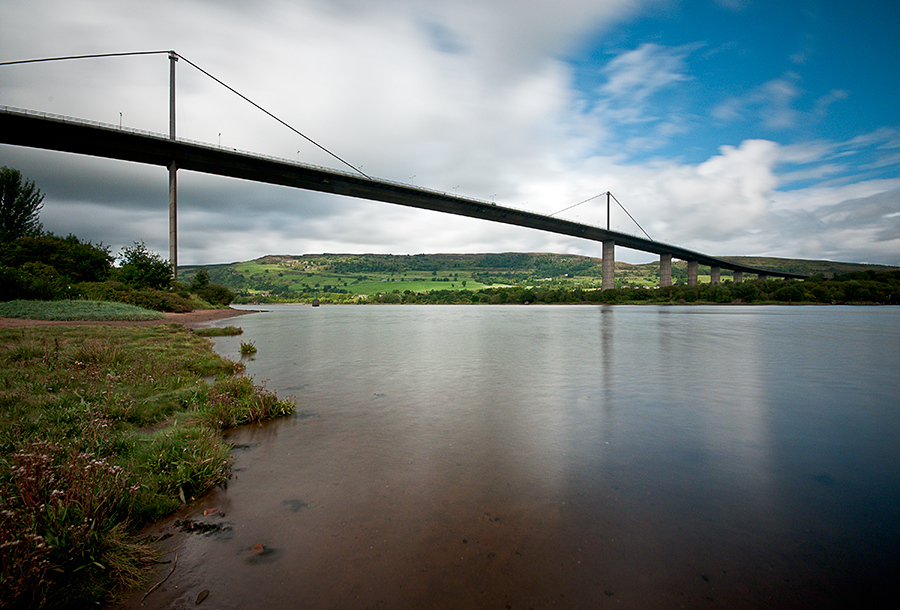
Erskine Bridge

The Erskine Bridge towers high over the western limit of the town. The bridge is the furthest west crossing point on the river and it soon expands to become the Firth of Clyde estuary.

=== Erskine House ===
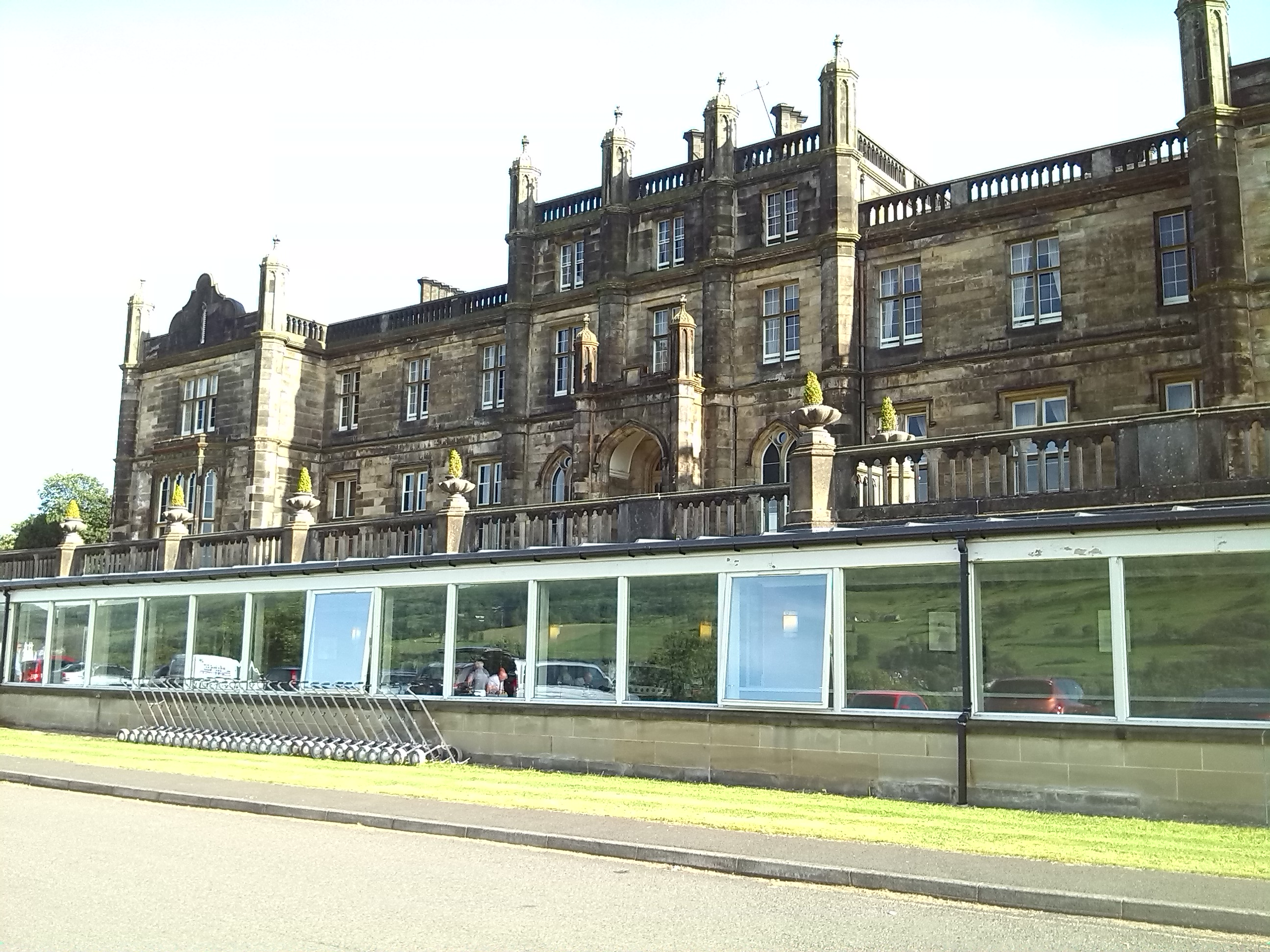
Earl of Mar Hotel

Erskine House was constructed between 1828 and 1845. It was designed by Sir Robert Smirke, the architect of the British Museum. During the First World War it became the Princess Louise Scottish Hospital for Limbless Sailors and Soldiers. It is now the 5-star Mar Hall Hotel, recalling the estate's former ownership by the Earl of Mar.

=== Erskine Hospital ===
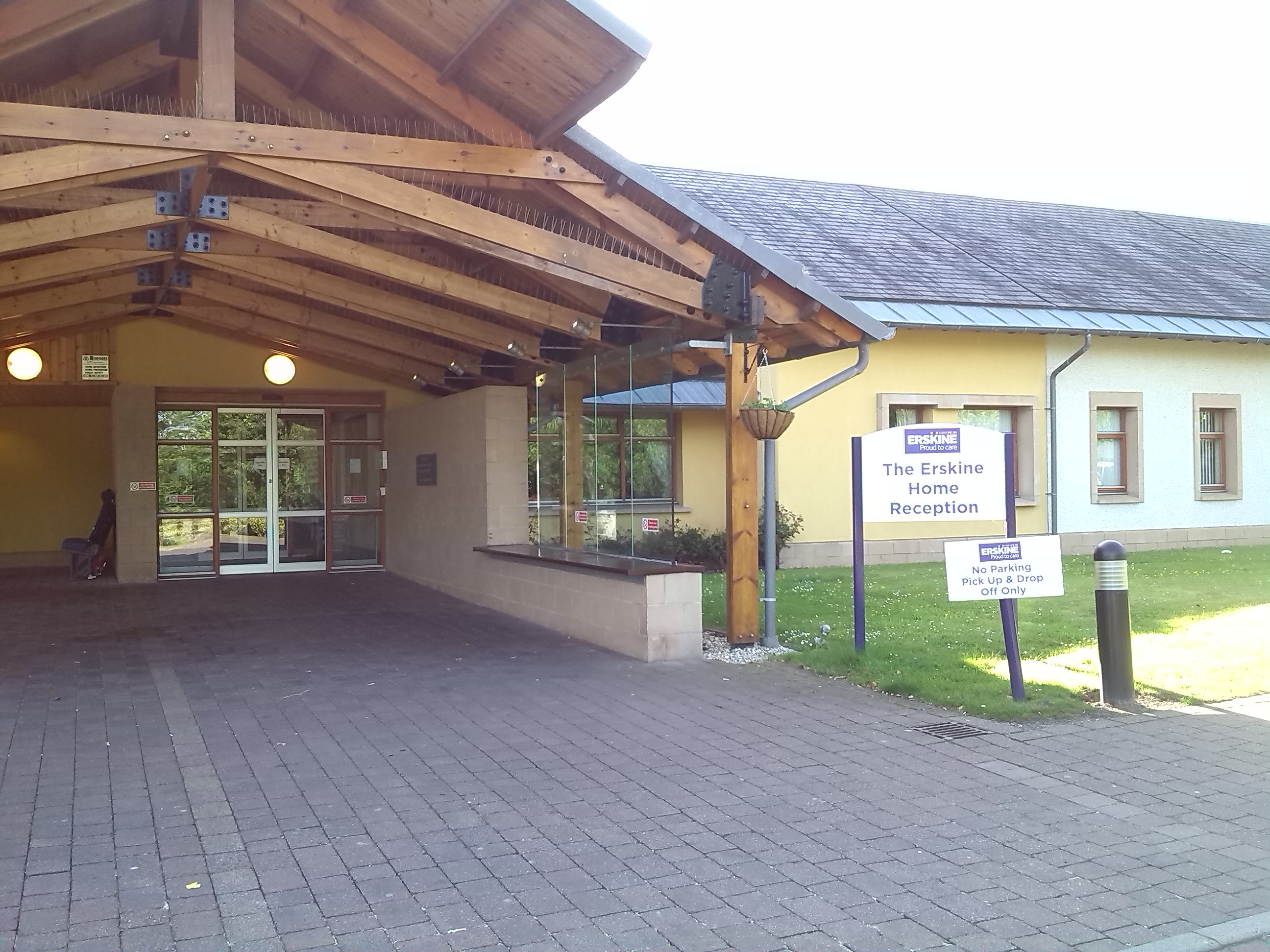
Erskine Hospital

The town is home to the Erskine Hospital, a facility that provides long-term care for veterans of the British Armed Forces and their Spouses, with a drop-in day centre and newly built Transitional Supported Accommodation for younger veterans at the Veterans Village near Bishopton. The charity opened as Princess Louise Scottish Hospital for Limbless Sailors and Soldiers in 1916 due to the urgent need to treat the thousands of military personnel that lost their limbs in the First World War. It has gone on to offer help to British ex-service people from all wars since World War One. It has grown to become one of the biggest ex-services facility in Scotland.

The charity has two units within the Erskine area and also specialist units in Glasgow and Edinburgh. The charity has strong links with the British royal family. Prince Charles is the charity's patron. He opened the flagship unit called Erskine Home in 2000. Princess Anne has also opened various units for the charity.

The charity host various fundraising events throughout the year. They host an annual motorbike meet, a Military themed ball, Christmas fayre and various concerts. The charity accept the help of volunteers from the public and needs to raise £10 million annually to run its services.

In February 2021, drug and alcohol addiction clinic Abbeycare Scotland relocated to the 34 bed unit in Meadows Drive no longer used by the Erskine charity.

=== Boden Boo ===
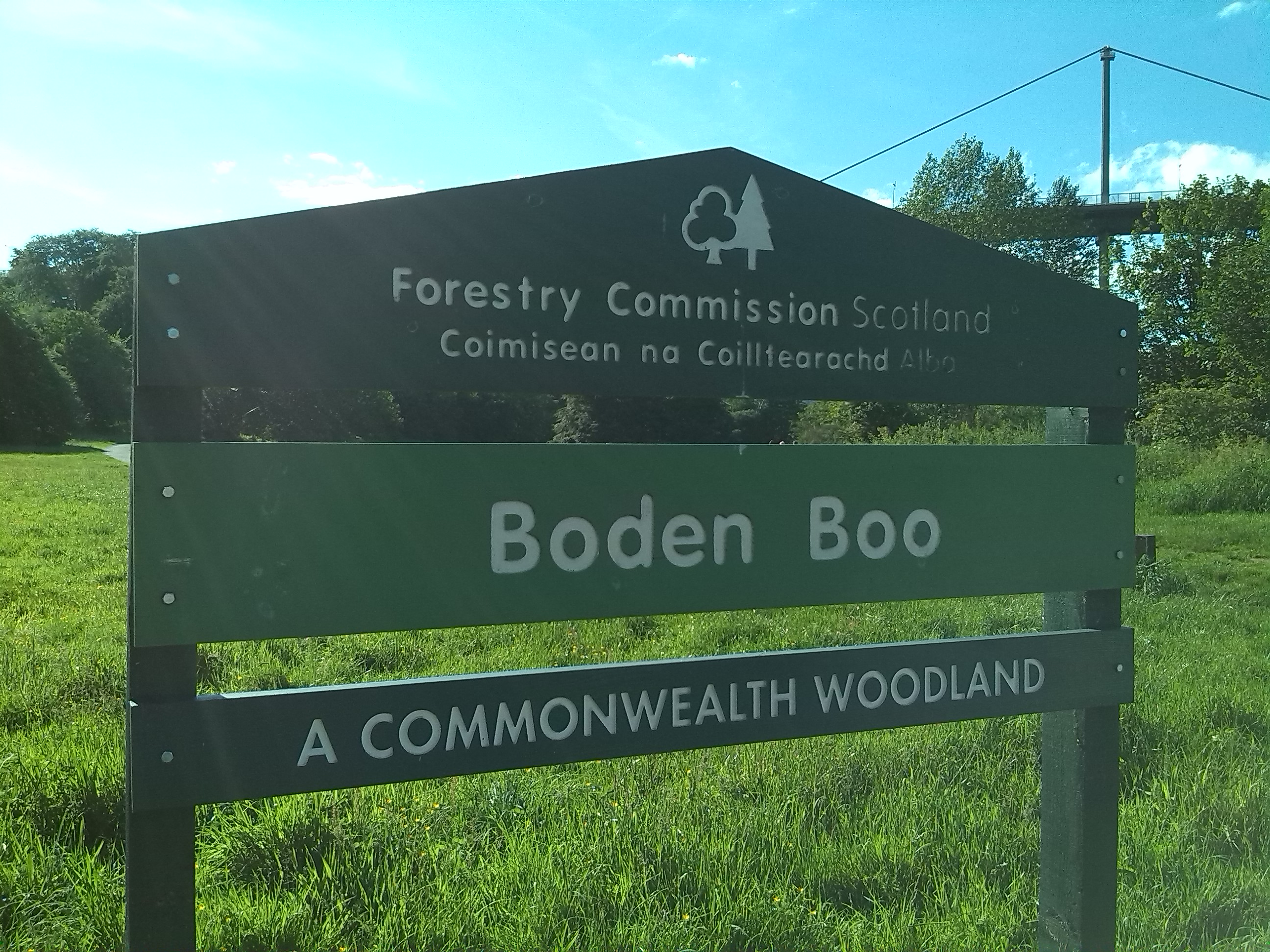
Boden Boo

There is a woodland area beneath the Erskine bridge with about 2 miles (3 km) of informal trails, picnic areas and views of the River Clyde. Erskine Beach is also situated within the area. Forestry and Land Scotland is responsible for the area.

=== Bodinbo Island ===
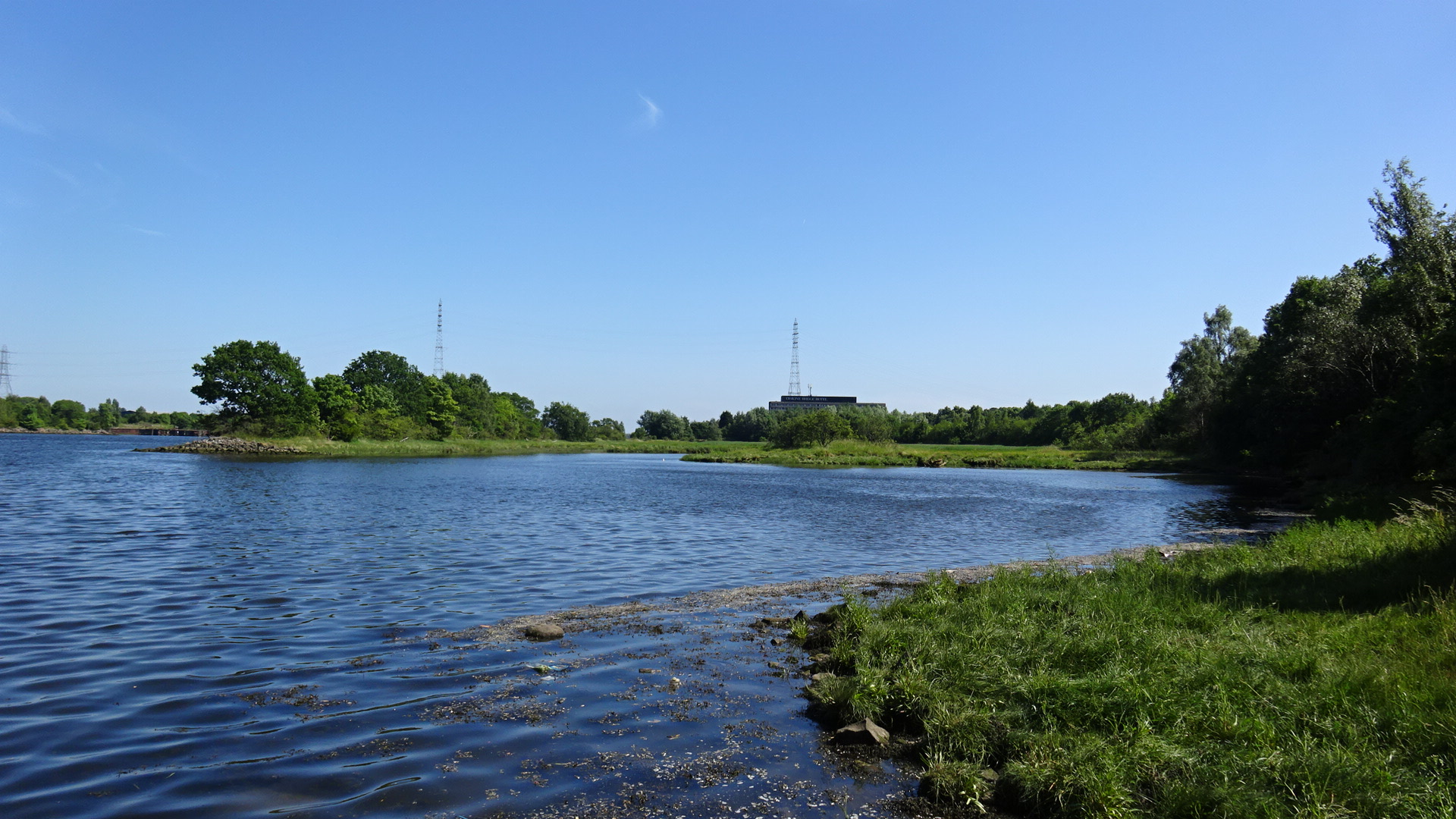
Bodinbo Island

This is one of seven or more islands that once stood in River Clyde. Bodinbo Island was a hazard to navigation but was cut off from the main river by a training dike in the mid 19th century.

=== Rashielee Quay and quarries ===
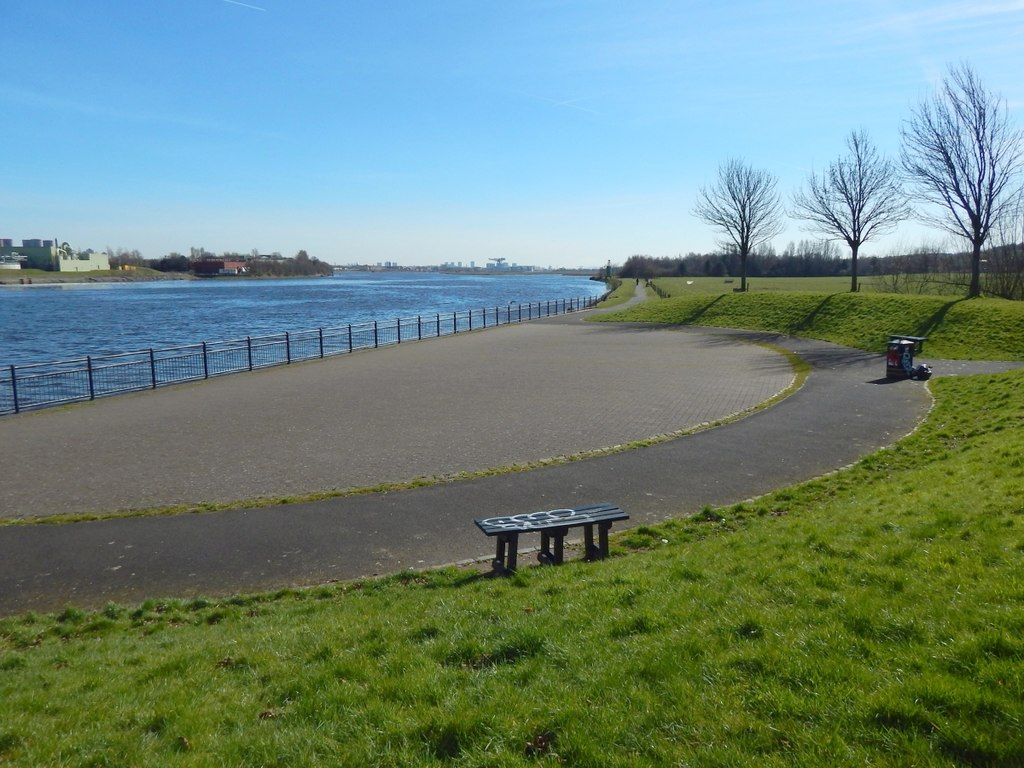
The former site of Rashielee Quay

Much of the whinstone used to build the retaining walls, jetties, quays, etc. in the lower Clyde area came from the Rashielee Quarries and was transported via Rashielee Quay. The area has now been landscaped however parts of the quarries are still present however the quay has been infilled.

=== Park or Fulton's Quay ===
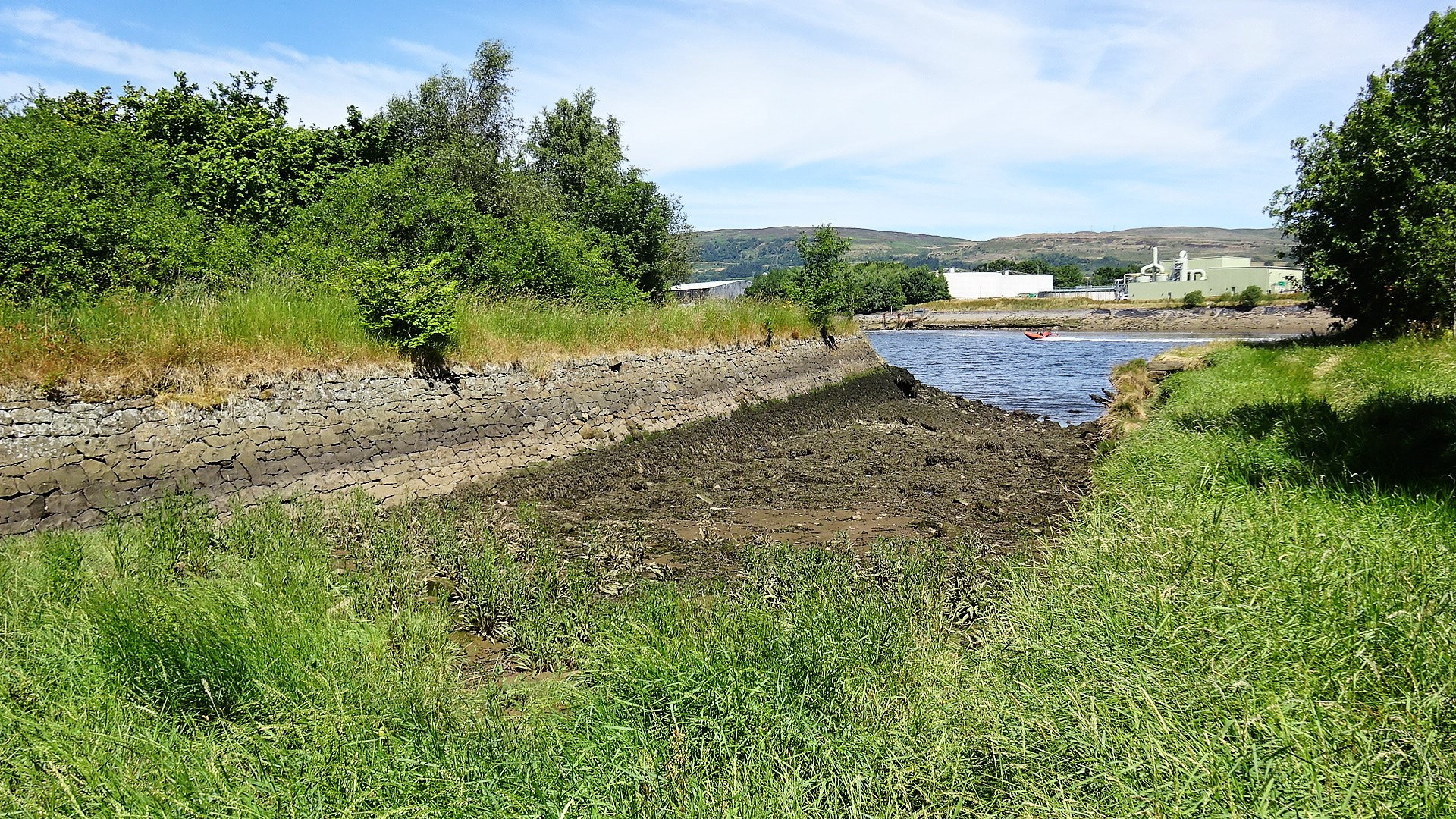
The old Park or Fulton's Quay.

Usually known as Park Quay this disused private quay and jetty stands close to the site of the old Park House estate. It was probably built in between 1789 and 1801 by the Fultons who made their fortune manufacturing silk in Paisley and one of the owners was W.T.Lithgow of the shipbuilding firm. The quay seems to have been last used in the mid 20th century.

=== Newshot Island ===
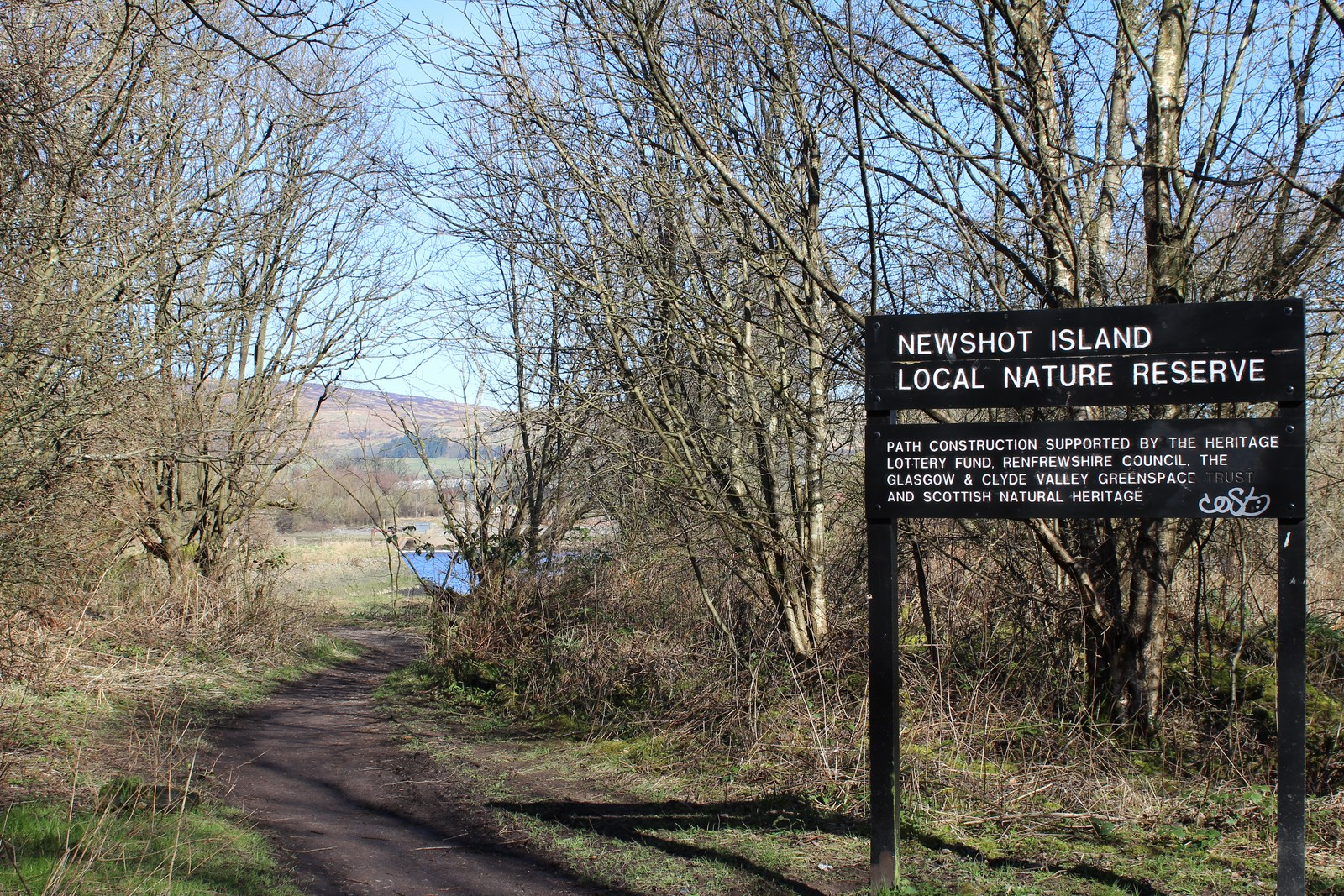
Entrance to Newshot Island Nature Reserve

Newshot Island Nature Reserve, a salt marsh which juts out into the River Clyde, is located in Erskine. Contrary to its name, it is now a peninsula, created from silt left over from the widening and deepening of the river in the 1930s, which connected the island to Erskine. The nature reserve acts as a feeding and resting point for a wide array of migratory birds traveling to and from regions such as North America, Siberia and West Africa.

== Transport ==
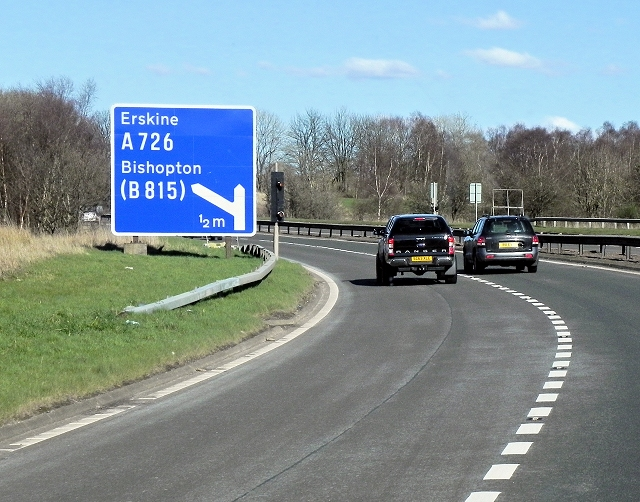
The M898 motorway

Erskine is served by Glasgow Airport, which is located 4 km south of the town.

Erskine is connected to the motorway network via the M898 motorway. Providing connections to both the M8 motorway, and the Erskine Bridge, both of which provide links to key roads for onward travel such as the M74 and A82.

The A726 road cuts through the centre of Erskine and is also the primary road for traveling into Paisley, The nearby town of Bishopton is accessible via the B815 road and Old Greenock Road, with Old Greenock Road also providing an alternative to the M8 for travel towards Port Glasgow.

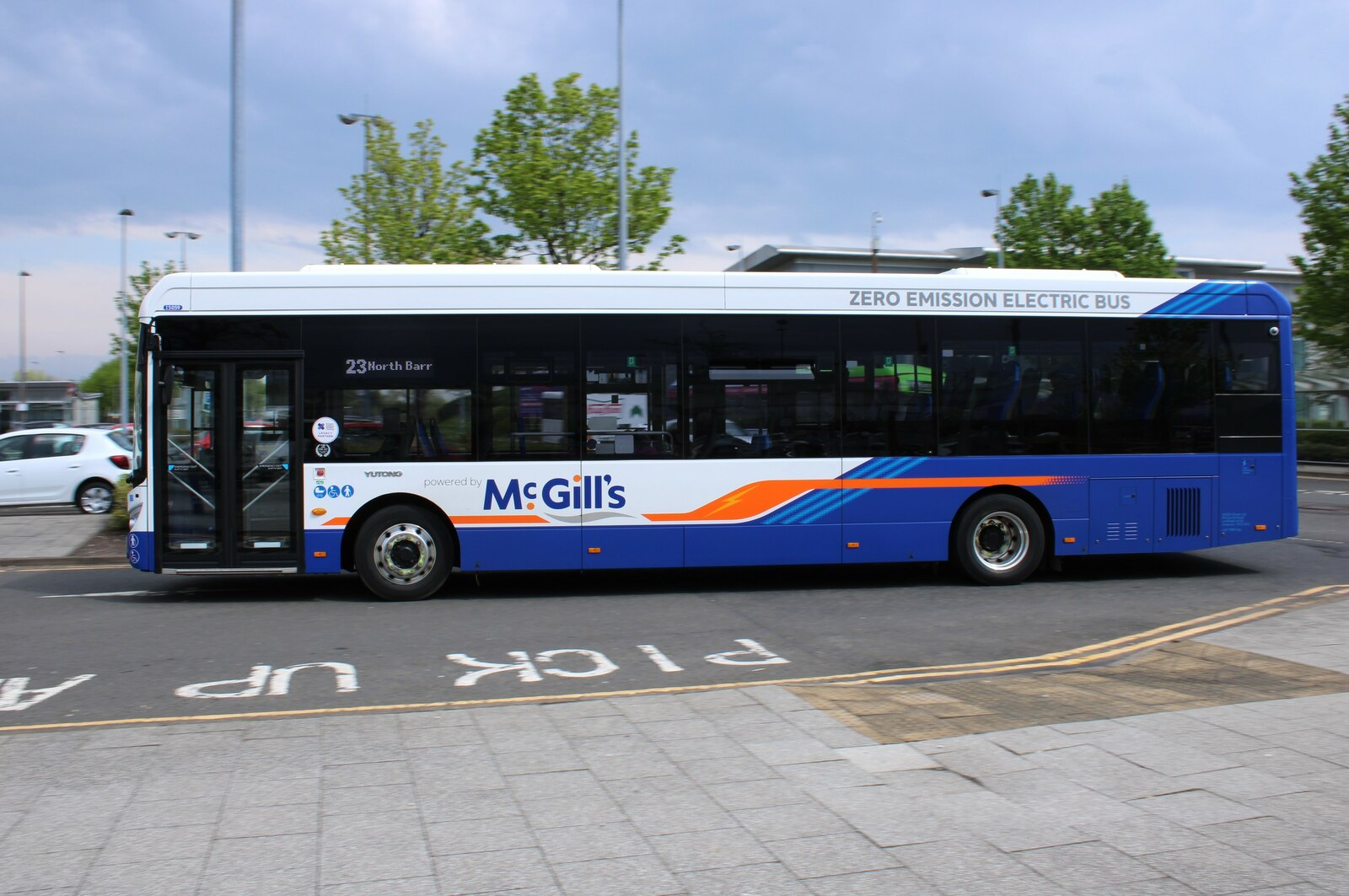
McGill's Buses service 23 bound for North Barr departing Braehead bus station

Erskine is served by McGill's Busses and previously Arriva Scotland West. Buses operate to Glasgow, Paisley, Renfrew, Inchinnan, Clydebank, Braehead, Govan, Glasgow Airport and Bishopton. Erskine has no railway station however it can be accessed on the national rail network via Paisley Gilmour Street railway station or Bishopton railway station, both of which have onward bus links to Erskine.

There are also plans to connect Erskine to Glasgow with a heavy metro line as part of the proposed Clyde Metro Project.

== Education ==
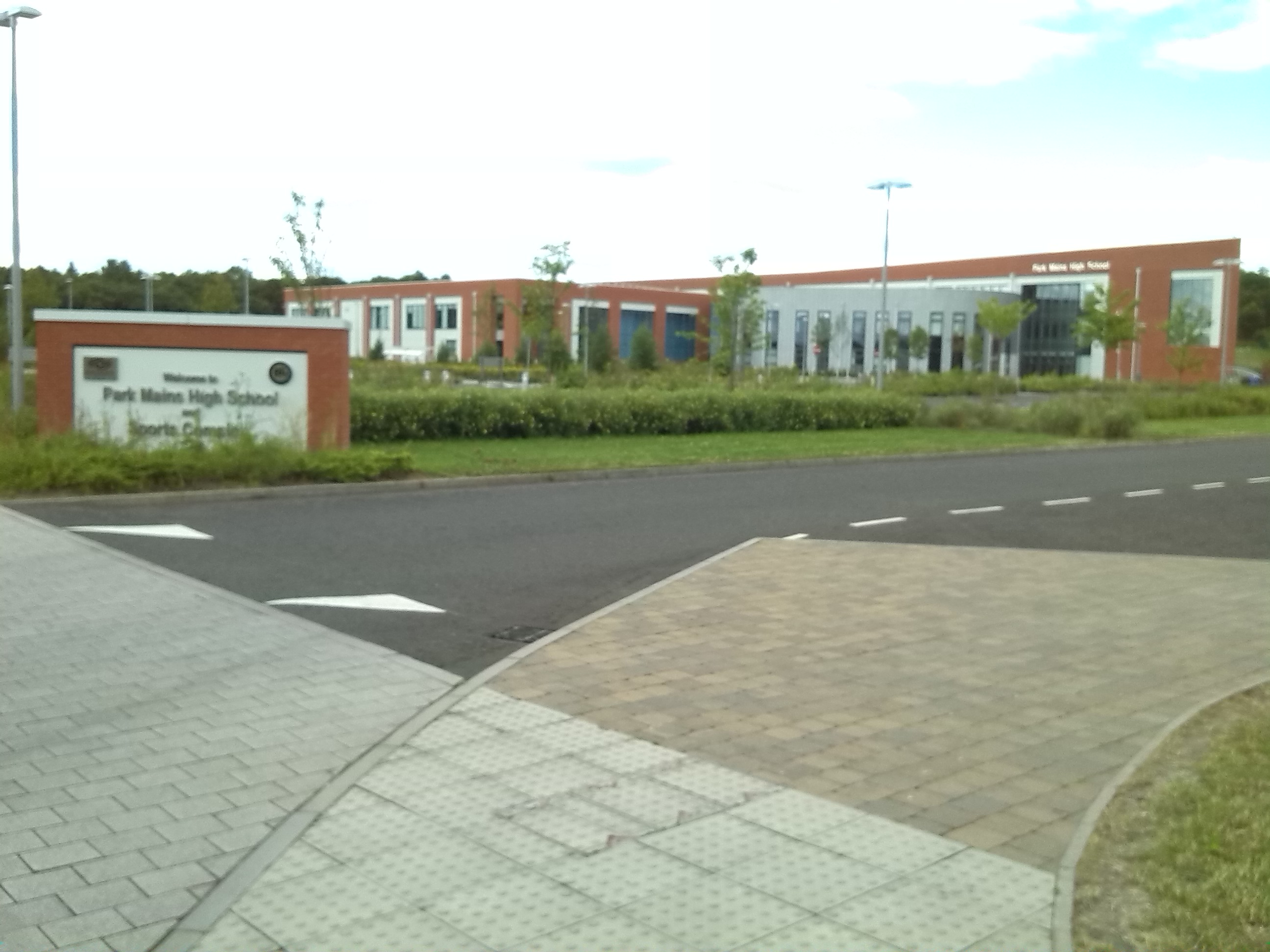
Park Mains High School

The town's secondary school is called Park Mains High School. It is the largest school in Renfrewshire and one of the biggest in Scotland with up to 1,400 students. It is a non-denominational state school. For Roman Catholic denomination state education, the town falls within the catchment area of Trinity High School in nearby Renfrew. Erskine has five primary schools. All are state schools, with Rashielea, Bargarran and Barsail providing non-denominational education and St John Bosco and St Anne's providing Roman Catholic denomination education.

== Notable residents ==
- John McArthur, union general during the American Civil War
- John Smeaton, apprehender of terrorists during the Glasgow Airport attacks
- Marcus Campbell, snooker player
- Stevie Jackson, guitarist with Belle & Sebastian
- Blair Spittal, footballer for Heart of Midlothian
- Rev Dr Andrew Stewart (1771–1838) minister of Erskine
- Maurice Malpas, former footballer for Motherwell and Dundee United, also capped by Scotland
- Evan Mooney, footballer for St Mirren and Arsenal
- Chloe Arthur, footballer for Crystal Palace in the Women's Super League and Scotland's women's national football team

== Gallery ==
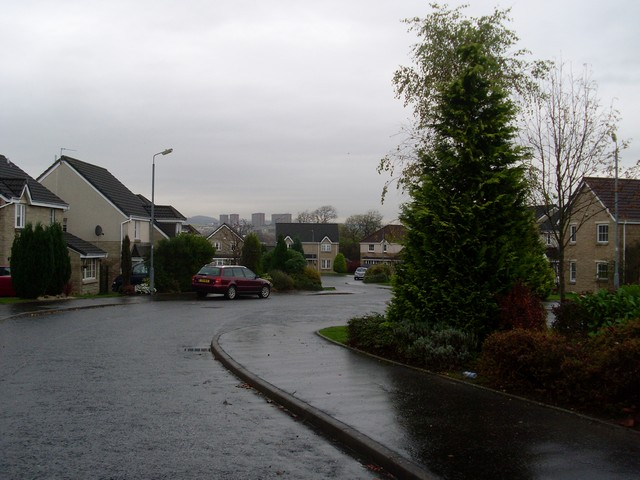
Torran Drive in Erskine

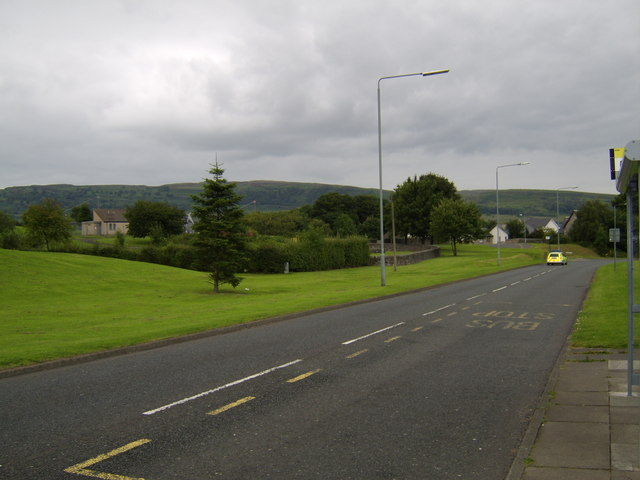
Barrhill Road in Erskine

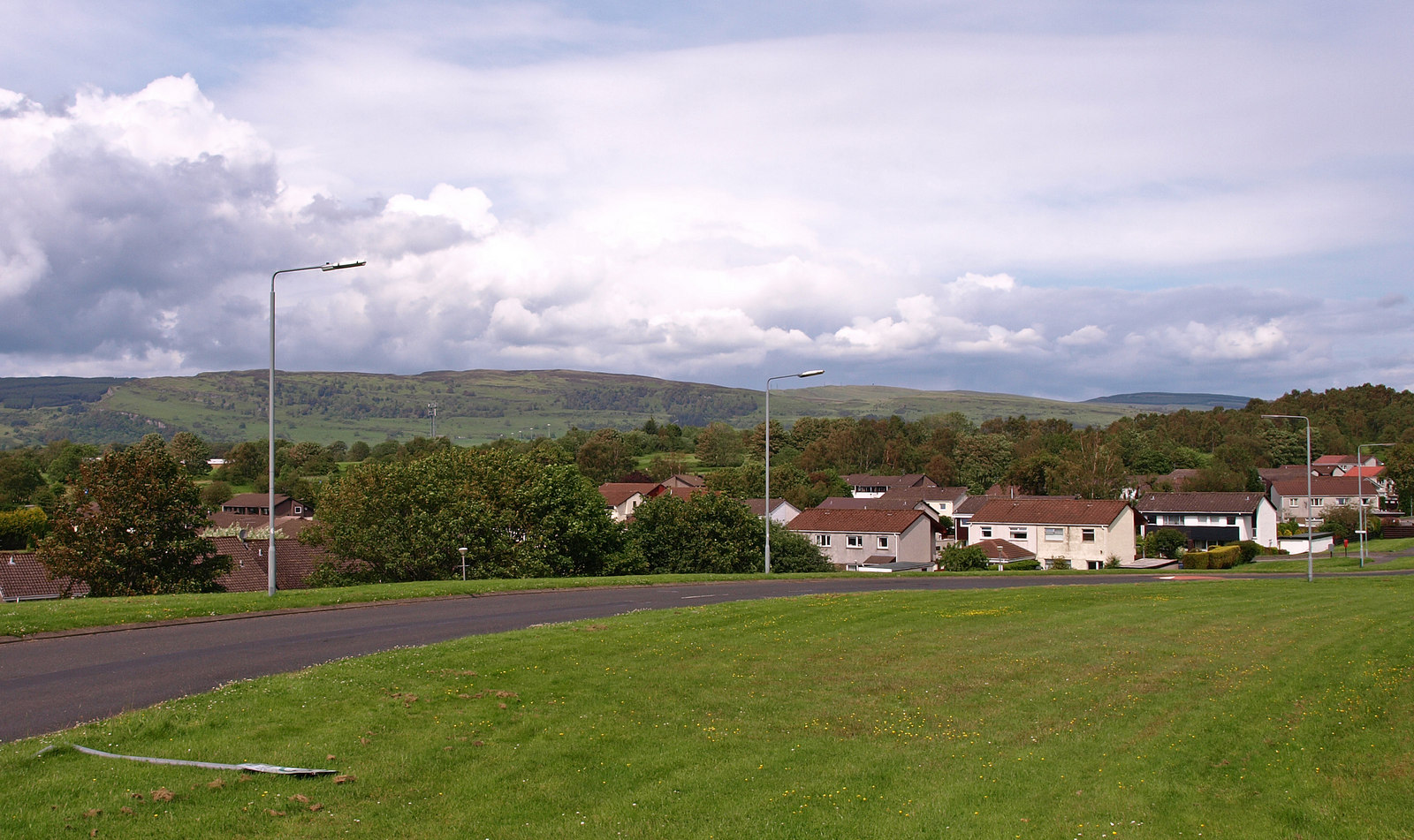
Linburn Road in Erskine

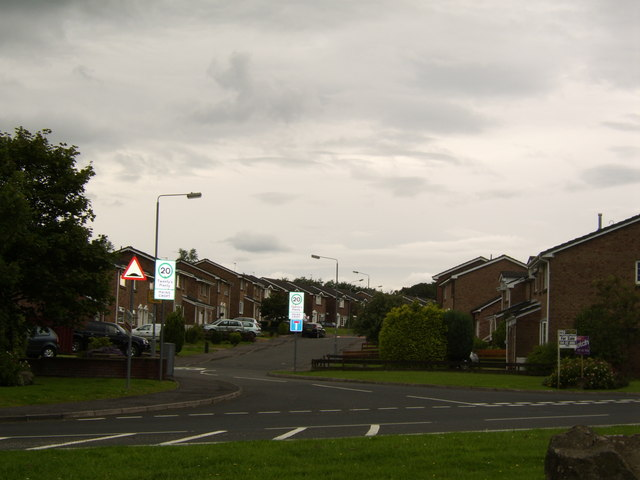
Mains Croft

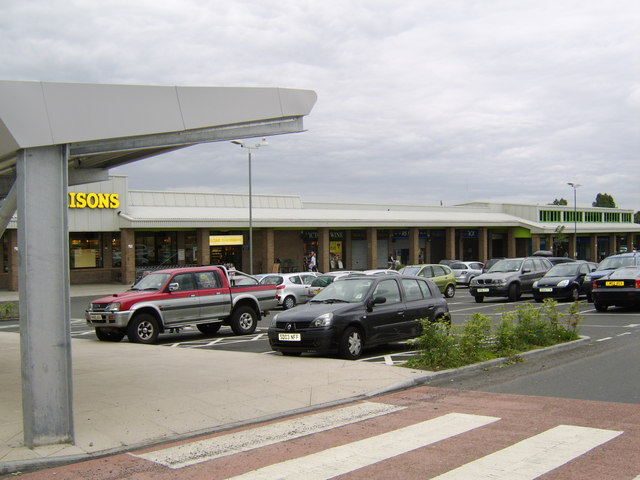
Bridgewater Shopping Centre

== See also ==
- Lamont Farm
- Blantyre Monument
- Bargarran Witches
- Donald's Quay - Original terminus of the Erskine Ferry
- St Patrick's Rock
