= Formakin House =

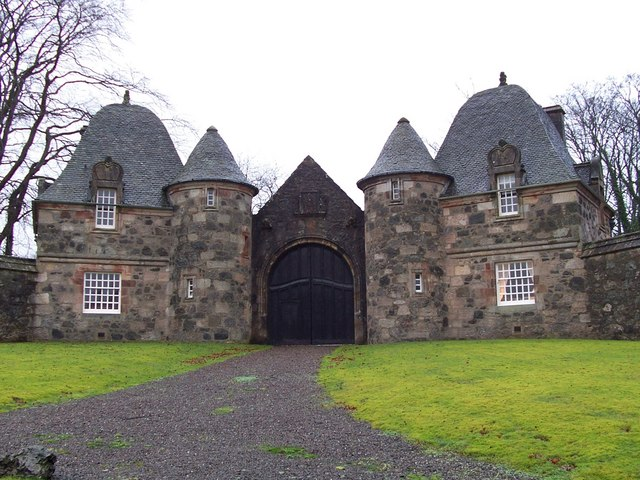
- Formakin entrance gates

- Location of Formakin House in Renfrewshire
- 55.9055°N 4.5452°W

Listed Building – Category A
- Designated: 10 June 1971
- Reference no.: LB10903

Inventory of Gardens and Designed Landscapes in Scotland
- Official name: Formakin
- Designated: 1 July 1987
- Reference no.: GDL00183

Formakin House is an early 20th-century mansion and estate in Renfrewshire, Scotland. It is located 2 kilometres (1.2 mi) south of the Firth of Clyde, and 2.5 kilometres (1.6 mi) west of Bishopton. Formakin was designed by Robert Lorimer for wealthy businessman John Holms, though the main house was never completed. It declined during the 20th century, but in the 1990s, restoration of the estate buildings was completed.

The house is protected as a category A listed building, and other structures including the arched entrance gateway and bothy are category B listed. The grounds are included in the Inventory of Gardens and Designed Landscapes in Scotland, the national listing of significant gardens.

== History ==
Formakin was the creation of John Augustus Holms (d. 1938), a stockbroker and art collector from Paisley. He purchased Millbank Farm, as it was then known, in 1902 and commissioned a new house that would contain his art collection, from his friend, the architect Robert Lorimer. Lorimer initially prepared plans for the estate, which was laid out from 1903. In 1907 the entrance lodges and stables were designed. The following year Lorimer converted the Old Meal Mill by the Dargavel Burn, where Holms lived while the new house was underway.

Lorimer produced designs for the house in 1909, in the style of a 17th-century Scottish tower house. Other buildings on the estate follow the same pattern. The former stable or bothy block, now known as the Miller's Tower, bears a stone inscribed with the date "1694", with the letters "DL" standing for "damned lie". Peter Anderson Graham, editor of Country Life, when shown a photograph of the building believed that it did in fact date to the 17th century. The gate lodges and stable blocks are topped with stone monkeys, (allegedly a self aimed joke by Holmes on the Victorian idiom where 'Monkey on the roof' meant to owe a large amount of money) hence earning the local nickname "The Monkey House" The walled garden and other planting in the grounds was designed by Lorimer under the guidance of Gertrude Jekyll.

The shell of the house had been completed by 1913, when work stopped. Holms had lost money on a bad speculation, and a fall from a horse supposedly upset his mental balance. Further work was carried out in 1920, but the house was never completed. Nevertheless, Holms continued to live on the estate, giving dinner parties in the half-finished house.

=== After Holms ===
When Holms died in debt in 1938, Formakin was sold to the Bradford-born entrepreneur Albert Ernest Pickard, owner of the Britannia Panopticon among other Glasgow ventures. It was requisitioned by the military during the Second World War, and maintenance began to decline. By the 1970s the buildings and grounds were derelict. After the Pickards died, a proposal was put forward to develop 195 houses on the estate, but planning permission was refused. Renfrew District Council campaigned to save the estate, eventually purchasing it in 1984 with funding from the National Heritage Memorial Fund. Formakin was operated as a visitor attraction for a time, and plans were made to redevelop the buildings and grounds. The venture was not successful, and Formakin was sold to developer Kit Martin, a specialist in country house restoration. Between 1988 and 1999 the estate buildings were restored and converted into 17 private dwellings.

== See also ==
- Làrach Mòr, John Holms' Rhododendron garden in the Highlands
- List of Category A listed buildings in Renfrewshire
- List of listed buildings in Erskine, Renfrewshire
