= Làrach Mòr =

- Location of Làrach Mòr in Lochaber, Highland
- 56.9113°N 5.8270°W

Inventory of Gardens and Designed Landscapes in Scotland
- Official name: Larach Mor
- Designated: 30 March 2003
- Reference no.: GDL00254

Làrach Mòr is a garden in Lochaber, in the western Highlands of Scotland. It lies 1 kilometre (0.62 mi) east of Arisaig, in the crook of a bend in the A830. It was developed during the 20th century as a collection of Rhododendrons, and is included in the Inventory of Gardens and Designed Landscapes in Scotland, the national listing of significant gardens.

== History ==
Làrach Mòr is on the Arisaig Estate, traditionally the land of the Macdonalds of Clanranald. In the 19th century the site was an orchard and kitchen garden, part of the grounds of Glen House, located around 1.2 kilometres (0.75 mi) to the south. Glen House was designed by James Gillespie Graham for the Chief of Clanranald in 1819, but was demolished in 1864, leaving only an earlier laird's house.

In 1927 a wealthy Glasgow businessman, John Augustus Holms (1866–1938), took a lease on 28 acres (11 ha) of land on the estate. His purpose was to develop his collection of Rhododendrons, which he had built up at Formakin House in Renfrewshire from the early 1920s. A keen gardener, Holms was a founder member of the Rhododendron Society, and his collection began to outgrow the space available at Formakin. The woodland site at Làrach Mòr was ideal in its climate and setting for the cultivation of Rhododendrons. He began by transplanting specimens from Formakin, and adding new plants with the ultimate aim of assembling an example of every species then available in Britain. Holms kept a detailed catalogue of each plant and its provenance, with corresponding labels attached to the specimens. He created shelter through plantings of Western Hemlock, bamboo and hornbeam, and established other flowering plants such as Embothrium, Gevuina, Weinmannia, Lomatia, Cunninghamia and Magnolia.

Holms began work on redeveloping a cottage on the site, employing architect Robert Lorimer who had designed Formakin House. On Holms' death in 1938, the house remained incomplete, but the Rhododendron collection included some 200 species. A sale of plants took place in 1939, leading to the partial dispersal of the collection. John Brennan, one of Holms' gardeners, continued to maintain the remaining plants, living in a bothy on site until 1959. From the 1960s, management has been renewed. In 2003, the "outstanding horticultural interest" of the collection was recognised through inclusion in the Inventory of Gardens and Designed Landscapes.
