= Bishopton, Renfrewshire =

Village in Scotland

Coordinates: 55.908622°N 4.5045200°W

Bishopton: Scottish Gaelic: Baile an Easbaig; Scots: Bishoptoun
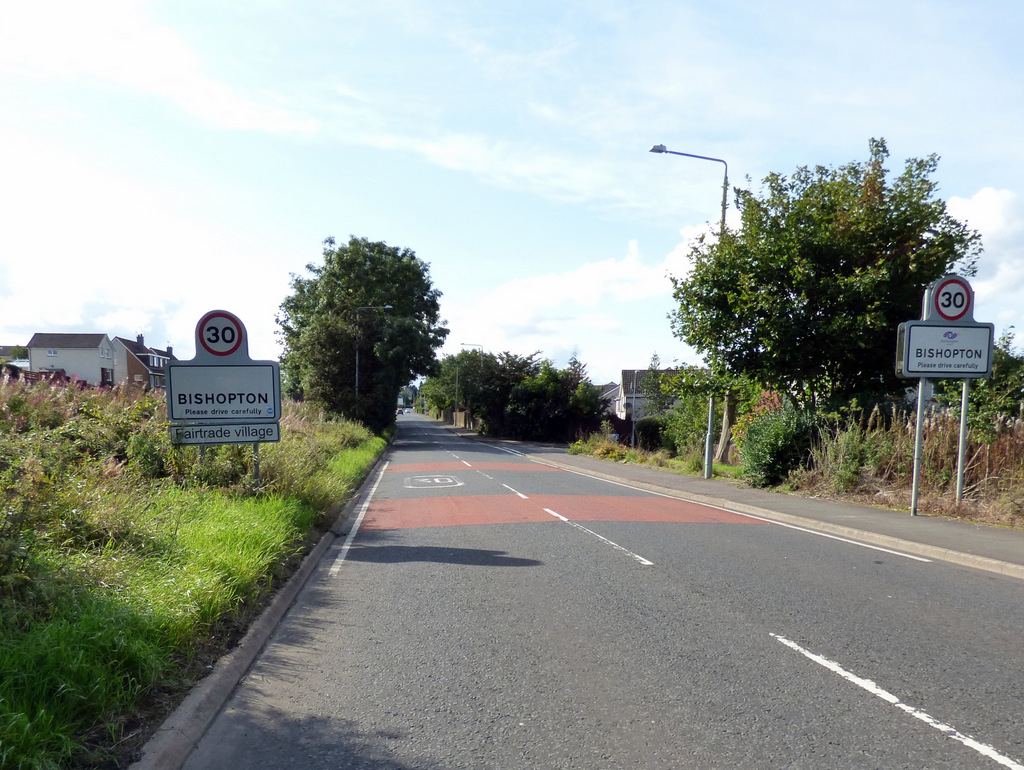
- Village signs west end on Greenock Road

- Location within Renfrewshire
- Population: 7,920 (2020)
- OS grid reference: NS 43543 71226
  - Edinburgh: 51 mi (82 km)
- Council area: Renfrewshire
- Lieutenancy area: Renfrewshire
- Country: Scotland
- Sovereign state: United Kingdom
- Post town: BISHOPTON
- Postcode district: PA7
- Dialling code: 01505
- UK Parliament: Paisley and Renfrewshire North
- Scottish Parliament: Renfrewshire North and West West Scotland
- Website: http://www.inbishopton.org.uk/

Bishopton (/ˈbɪʃəptən/; Scots: Bishoptoun; Scottish Gaelic: Baile an Easbaig) is a village in Renfrewshire, Scotland. It is located around 2 miles (3 km) west of Erskine. Royal Ordnance Factory Bishopton was located on the edge of the village and is now being redeveloped as private housing into a community named Dargavel.

== History ==
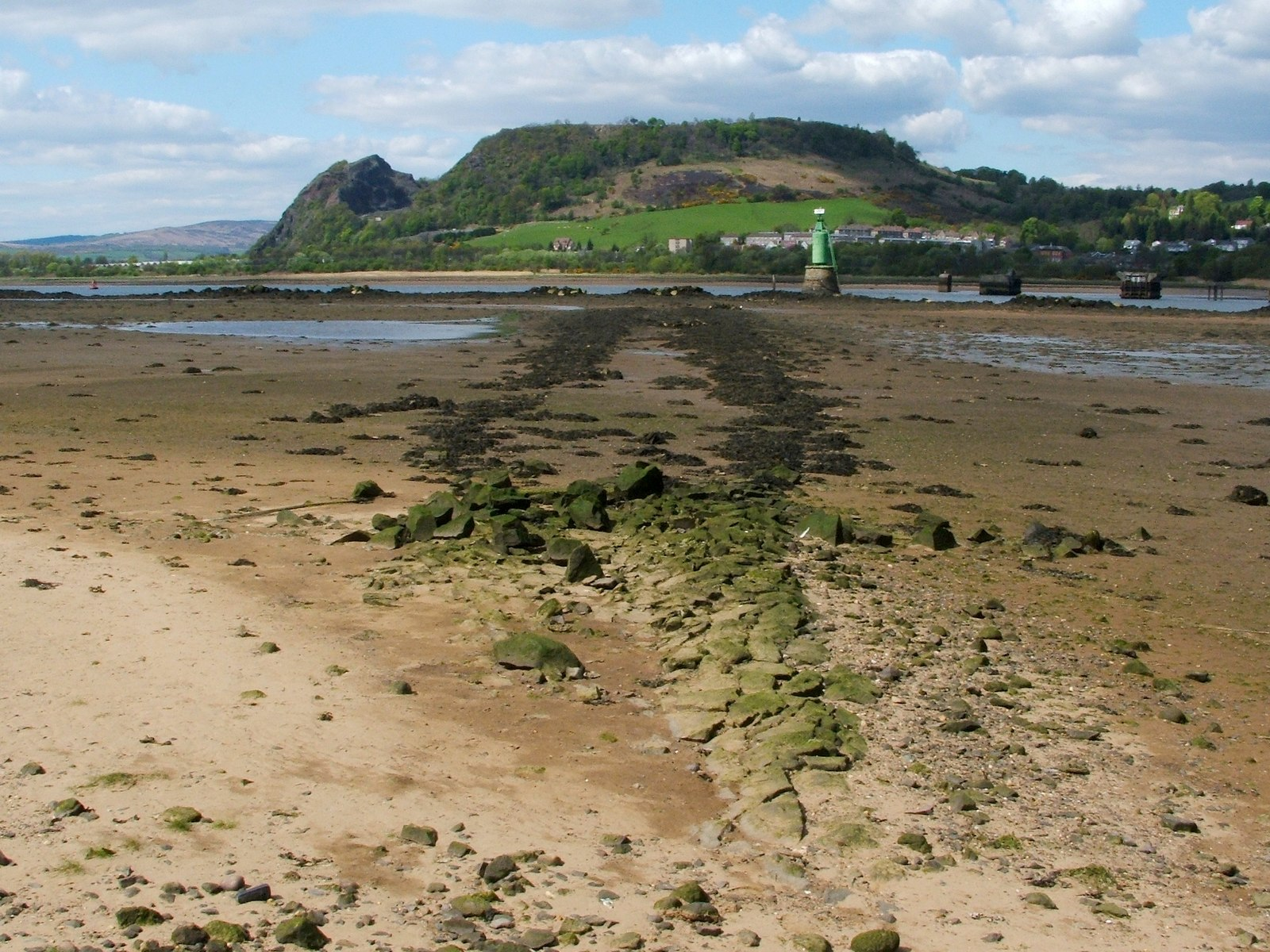
Supposed remains of a Roman causeway towards Dumbuck Hill

There was a Roman Fort at Bishopton which was discovered from aerial photographs in 1949. The fort is about 1 km (0.6 mi) west of the village. It overlooked the former ford at Dumbuck, on a flat-topped hill around 60 metres (200 ft) above the river, allowing ready surveillance of the River Clyde. The fort at Whitemoss Farm may have been held initially from AD 140 to 155. Pottery with Antonine era date stamps was found at the site. The pottery and many other finds were catalogued at the Hunterian Museum in Glasgow along with several coeval items like the distance slab of the Twentieth Legion from Old Kilpatrick. There was an earlier Roman fort on Barochan Hill, less than 2 miles (3 km) to the south-west towards Houston. Bishopton was originally in the Parish of Erskine. The name of the village is reflected in a nearby house: Bishopton House. A famous family called the Brisbanes lived there. The house became a convent known as Good Shepherd Centre and latterly Cora Foundation.

== The former Royal Ordnance Factory site ==
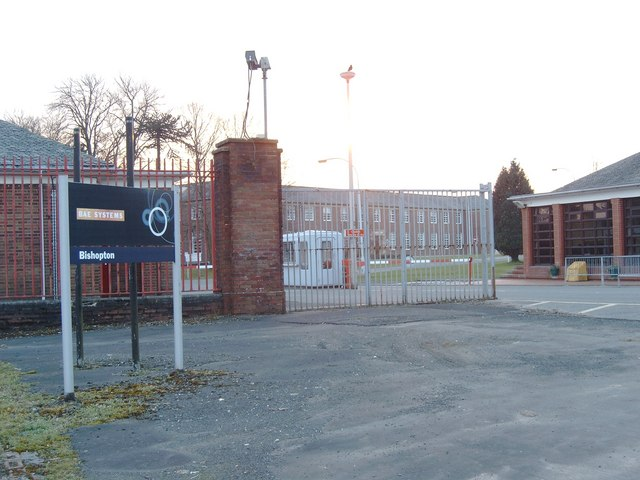
Royal Ordnance Factory

A large explosive manufacturing factory was once sited in Bishopton. The Royal Ordnance Factory Bishopton (ROF) was opened during World War II on farm land, acquired by compulsory purchase order. It was situated on the western side of the railway line running through Bishopton. Over 2,000 acres (8 km^{2}) of land from up to seven farms was used to build the factory. The land included Dargavel House. The southern end of the site included the majority of the land formerly used by the World War I National Filling Factory, Georgetown. The ROF was privatised in 1984, being sold to British Aerospace (now BAE Systems), which has since scaled down and shut most of the site. The factory was in use from 1915 until 2002, producing ammunition, explosives and propellants.

After privatisation, the MOD Police moved out and the former MOD Police Social Club at HolmPark, and its adjoining sports field, became part of Bishopton. The former MOD Police houses at both HolmPark and Rossland Crescent were sold off to private buyers. Bishopton's Medical Centre was built in a corner of the sports field, opposite the shops.

=== Dargavel Village ===
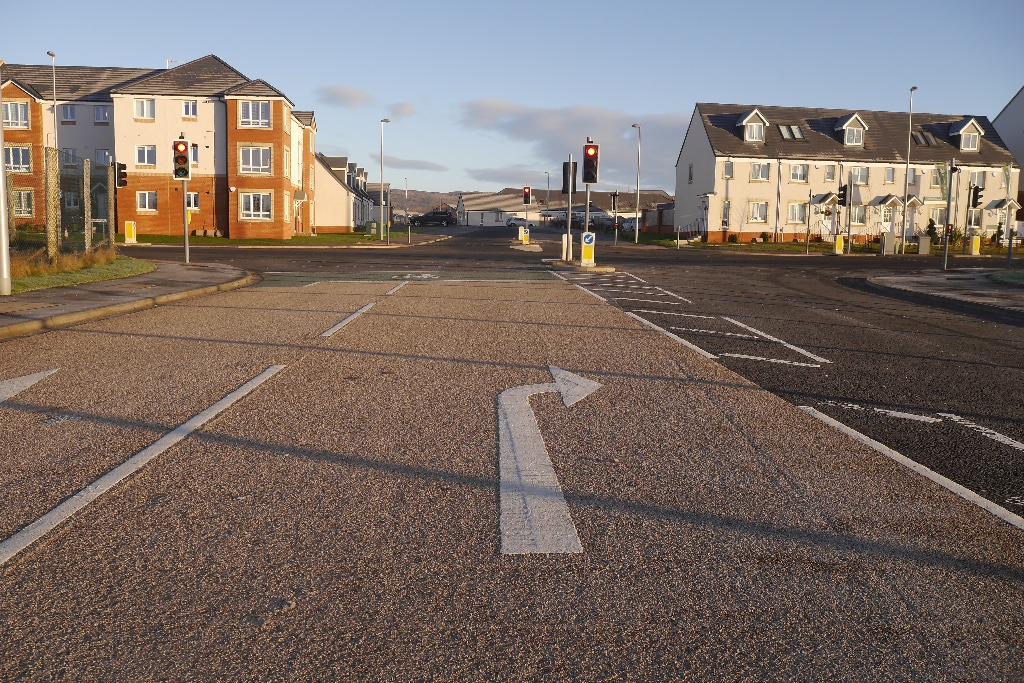
Modern apartments on Barrangarry Road

In 2005, BAE Systems and Redrow submitted proposals to use a large part of the site for building new housing which would, at least, double the size of Bishopton. Local residents indicated their concern at the proposals; the major concerns they had were with the size of the expansion – with the associated knock-on effects to the local infrastructure – and fears of the contamination that was likely to be found on the site. In December 2008 Renfrewshire Council granted outline planning consent for the development and detailed planning consent for a related motorway junction off the A8/M8.

By early 2016, following extensive decontamination work, a significant portion of the development had been completed, with a number of the houses (the total number of planned dwellings having risen from 2,500 in 2008 to 4,000 in 2019, involving multiple housebuilders) built and inhabited along with some shopping facilities. Construction of the housing is ongoing and the development is confirmed to include 4,000 new homes. The site is being developed by a consortium of different private builders.

Work on a new satellite health and doctors facility for the village commenced in May 2024.

== Education ==
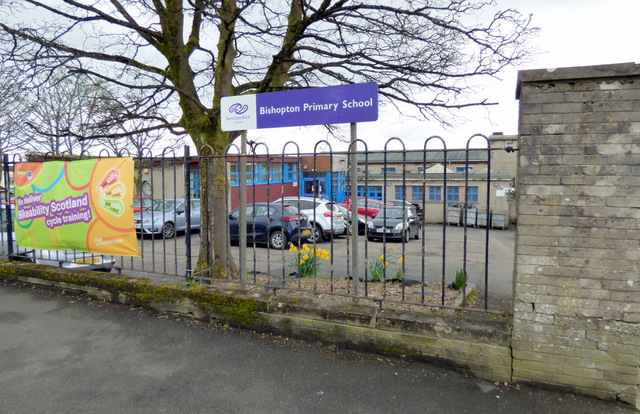
Bishopton Primary School

Bishopton Primary School – a co-educational, non-denominational state school – was the only first primary school within the village.

A new, second, primary school which was originally approved in 2009 had still not been completed a decade on and was reassessed to be built in 2021 with fresh concerns over the proposed catchment zone potentially leading to division between the old and new communities in the area, and that the school would simply be too small to cope with the ongoing influx of children, with the majority of the Dargavel housing being marketed for young families to move there. Dargavel Primary School was however opened in January 2022.

A third primary school, also in Dargavel, is set to open in summer 2027. In July 2024, it was announced focus groups were to take place on the development of a new school to be built on land located at the north end of Craigton Drive.

For secondary education, the village falls within the catchment area of Park Mains High School in Erskine, and within the catchment of Trinity High School in Renfrew, as part of Scotland's network of Catholic educational institutions.

== Notable people ==
- Baroness Goldie, former MSP & leader of the Scottish Conservatives
- Derek Mackay, former MSP & Cabinet Secretary for Finance and the Economy
- Gavin Newlands, MP for Paisley and Renfrewshire North
- Douglas Alexander former MP & Foreign Secretary
- Wendy Alexander, former MSP & leader of Scottish Labour Party

== Transport ==
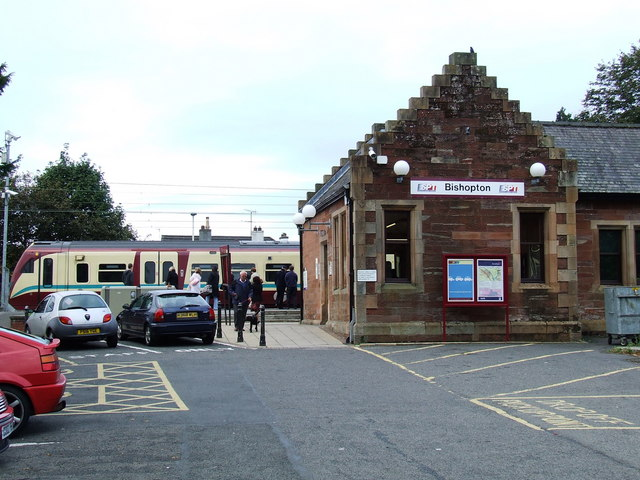
Bishopton railway station

Bishopton is located around 2 miles (3 km) from the southern end of the Erskine Bridge, which spans the River Clyde between Renfrewshire and West Dunbartonshire. Before the bridge was built, the Erskine Ferry transported vehicles across the Clyde. The A8 road passes through Bishopton, and the M8 motorway passes to the north, running parallel to the A8, with access to Bishopton from junctions 30 and 31. Bus services are provided by McGill's, with buses operating to Clydebank, Greenock and Erskine.

Bishopton is served by Bishopton railway station on the Inverclyde Line. The station opened in 1841. There are five services per hour (off-peak): four to/from Gourock, and one to/from Wemyss Bay with four per hour in the other direction to and from Glasgow Central. Evenings and Sundays there are two trains per hour to Glasgow Central and hourly services to both Wemyss Bay and Gourock. A short branch to the former ROF factory is now disused.

Bishopton is 4 miles (6.4 km) north-west of Glasgow Airport.

== Geography ==
Bishopton is situated in the north east of Renfrewshire. It lies to the south of the River Clyde. The village borders a number of nearby settlements, some separated by a rural hinterland. It is about 5 miles (8 km) north-west of Paisley and around 59 m (195 ft) above sea level. In terms of address names, Bishopton has Crescents, Roads and Drives, but no Streets.

=== Climate ===
Climate data for Abbotsinch (Note: Weather station is located 7 miles (11 km) from the Glasgow city centre.), elevation: 8 m (26 ft), 1991–2020 normals, extremes 1951–present
Month	Jan	Feb	Mar	Apr	May	Jun	Jul	Aug	Sep	Oct	Nov	Dec	Year
Record high °C (°F)	13.6 (56.5)	14.4 (57.9)	20.3 (68.5)	24.0 (75.2)	27.4 (81.3)	31.9 (89.4)	30.1 (86.2)	31.2 (88.2)	28.8 (83.8)	23.9 (75.0)	16.4 (61.5)	14.6 (58.3)	31.9 (89.4)
Mean daily maximum °C (°F)	6.7 (44.1)	7.4 (45.3)	9.2 (48.6)	12.2 (54.0)	15.4 (59.7)	17.8 (64.0)	19.3 (66.7)	18.9 (66.0)	16.5 (61.7)	12.8 (55.0)	9.3 (48.7)	6.8 (44.2)	12.7 (54.9)
Daily mean °C (°F)	4.1 (39.4)	4.5 (40.1)	5.9 (42.6)	8.2 (46.8)	10.9 (51.6)	13.6 (56.5)	15.3 (59.5)	14.9 (58.8)	12.9 (55.2)	9.6 (49.3)	6.4 (43.5)	4.1 (39.4)	9.2 (48.6)
Mean daily minimum °C (°F)	1.5 (34.7)	1.6 (34.9)	2.6 (36.7)	4.2 (39.6)	6.5 (43.7)	9.4 (48.9)	11.2 (52.2)	10.9 (51.6)	9.2 (48.6)	6.4 (43.5)	3.6 (38.5)	1.4 (34.5)	5.7 (42.3)
Record low °C (°F)	−17.4 (0.7)	−15.0 (5.0)	−12.5 (9.5)	−5.4 (22.3)	−3.9 (25.0)	1.2 (34.2)	0.8 (33.4)	1.1 (34.0)	−4.0 (24.8)	−7.1 (19.2)	−10.4 (13.3)	−19.9 (−3.8)	−19.9 (−3.8)
Average precipitation mm (inches)	157.3 (6.19)	125.0 (4.92)	112.4 (4.43)	73.2 (2.88)	71.9 (2.83)	80.8 (3.18)	91.9 (3.62)	107.1 (4.22)	109.4 (4.31)	135.7 (5.34)	145.0 (5.71)	160.7 (6.33)	1,370.2 (53.94)
Average precipitation days (≥ 1.0 mm)	18.2	15.2	14.9	12.6	12.2	12.8	13.4	14.5	14.3	17.2	18.0	18.0	181.2
Mean monthly sunshine hours	45.9	70.0	106.1	148.2	197.2	159.2	162.7	152.9	117.9	84.9	57.5	41.7	1,344.1
Source 1: Met Office
Source 2: Starlings Roost Weather

== See also ==
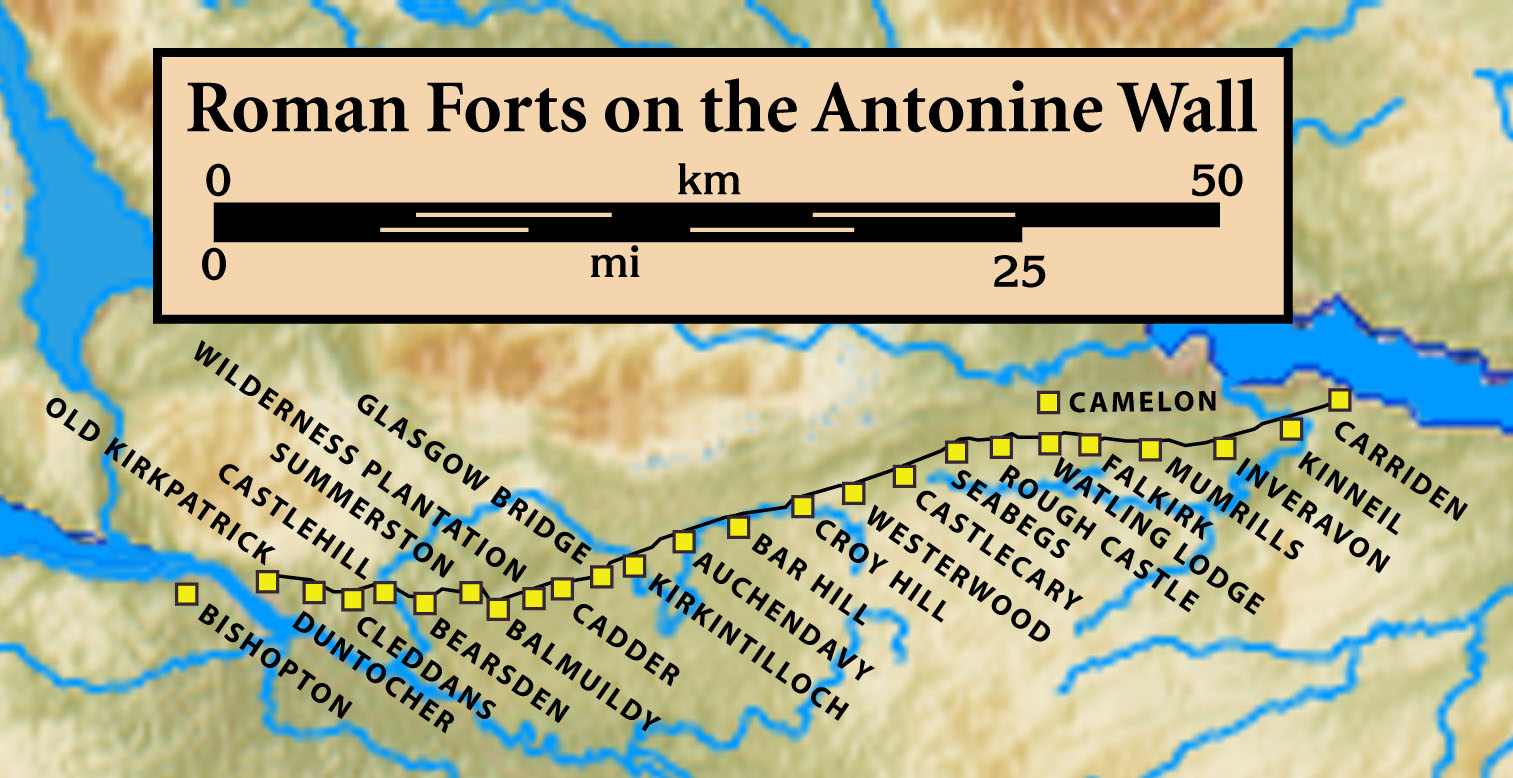
Forts and Fortlets associated with the Antonine Wall from west to east: Bishopton, Old Kilpatrick, Duntocher, Cleddans, Castlehill, Bearsden, Summerston, Balmuildy, Wilderness Plantation, Cadder, Glasgow Bridge, Kirkintilloch, Auchendavy, Bar Hill, Croy Hill, Westerwood, Castlecary, Seabegs, Rough Castle, Camelon, Watling Lodge, Falkirk, Mumrills, Inveravon, Kinneil, Carriden

- Blantyre Monument
- Bishopton railway station
- Formakin Estate
- ROF Bishopton
