= White Inch =

Small river island near Glasgow, Scotland

Location
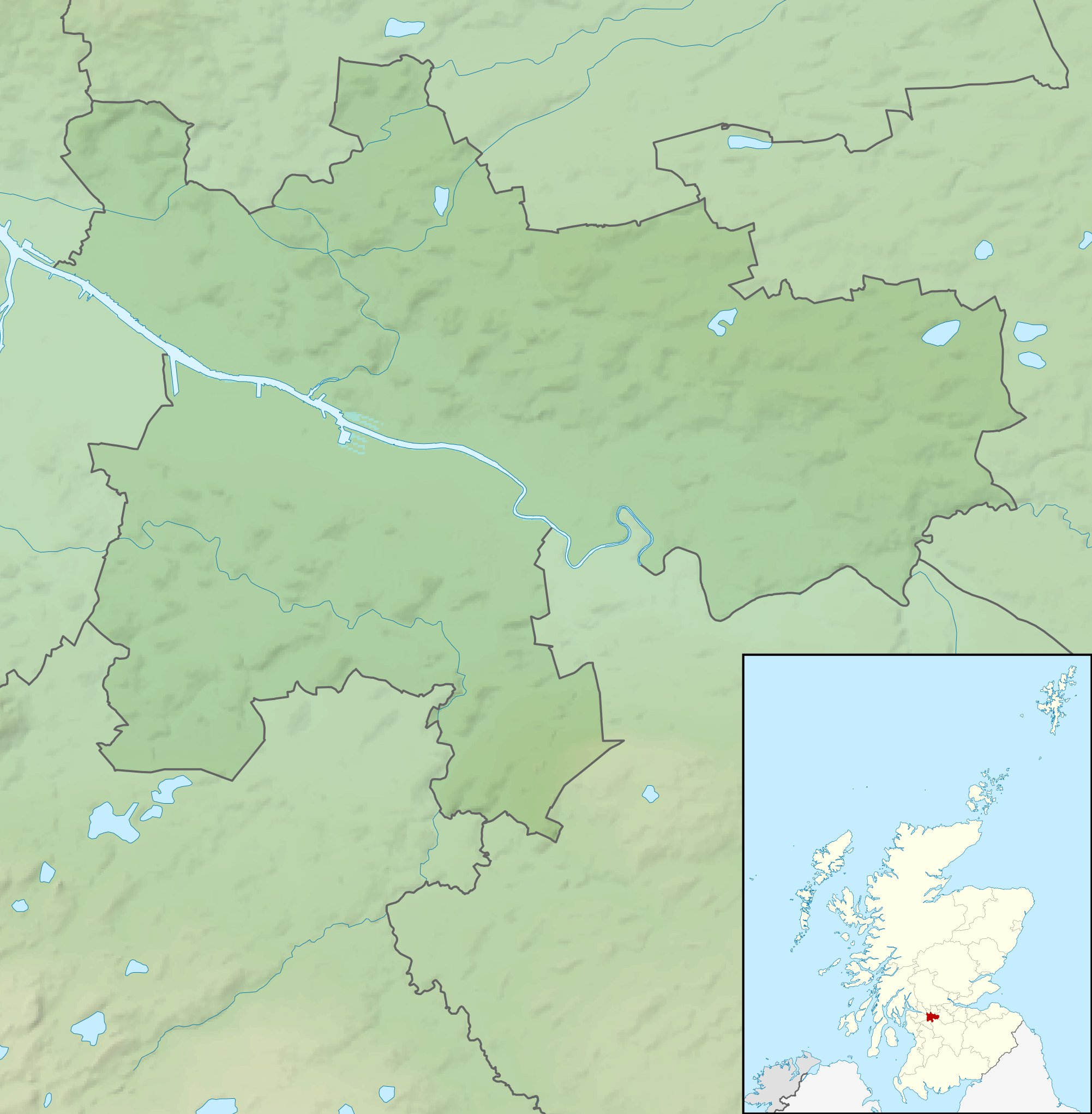
- Location in Glasgow area Location in Scotland
- OS grid reference: NS545669
- Coordinates: 55.8739°N 4.3268°W

Physical geography
- Island group: Islands of the River Clyde

Administration
- Council area: Lanarkshire
- Country: Scotland
- Sovereign state: United Kingdom

Demographics
- Population: 0

White Inch was an island lying in the estuarine waters of the River Clyde close to Glasgow in the Parish of Govan, Lanarkshire, Scotland. Due to the deliberate disposal of dredged material from the Clyde, it became physically part of the northern, Lanarkshire side, of the river bank from the 1830s and is now entirely built over. The name lives on in the Whiteinch district of Glasgow, street names, etc., and probably relates to white coloured sand deposits.

== Islands in the River Clyde ==
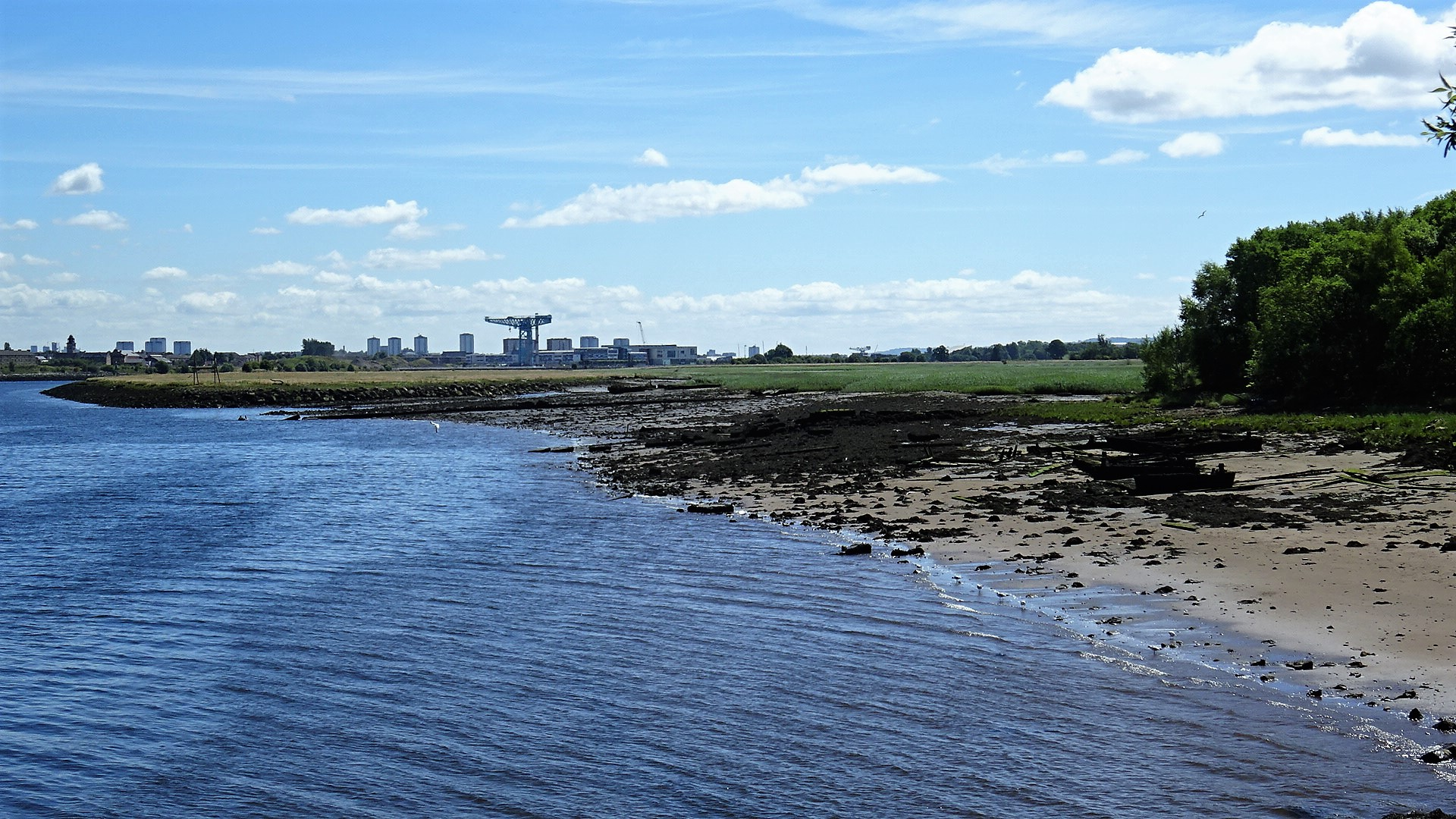
View up the Clyde from Newshot Island.

Islands of the River Clyde, rather than sand or mud banks only exposed at low water, once included in the order, working upstream towards Glasgow:- Milton, Bodinbo, Newshot, Ron, Sand Inch, Kings Inch, Buck Inch, White Inch, and Water Inch. A Colin's Isle also once sat in the waters of the Cart near its confluence with the River Clyde. Buck Inch was locally known as the 'Packman Isle' and has merged with the lands of Scotstoun.

The name 'Inch' is Scots deriving from the Gaelic 'Innis', an island. The name 'Ron' in Scots refers to a thicket of hawthorns or rose briers, an area of stunted and crowded woodland. Buck Inch may translate as a place where the sound of pouring or gushing water was heard.

== White Inch ==
Circa 1636-52 Gordon's map shows White Inch and the other islands without recording the name. Prior to 1732 the island is clearly shown in the Clyde on Herman Moll's map with Water Inch upstream and Buck Inch downstream. Roy's map of circa 1747 does not clearly indicate an island, but Whiteinch farm is shown as is a road running east–west. James Barry's 1758 plan of the Clyde names White Inch and shows it as an island.

It lay opposite the old Linthouse Estate and between the River Kelvin and the Whiteinch Burn. Access to the island would have been relatively straightforward as the water depth was as little as 18 inches (46 cm), permitting its use as part of a farm owned by the Smith's of Jordanhill.

=== Dredging of the Clyde ===
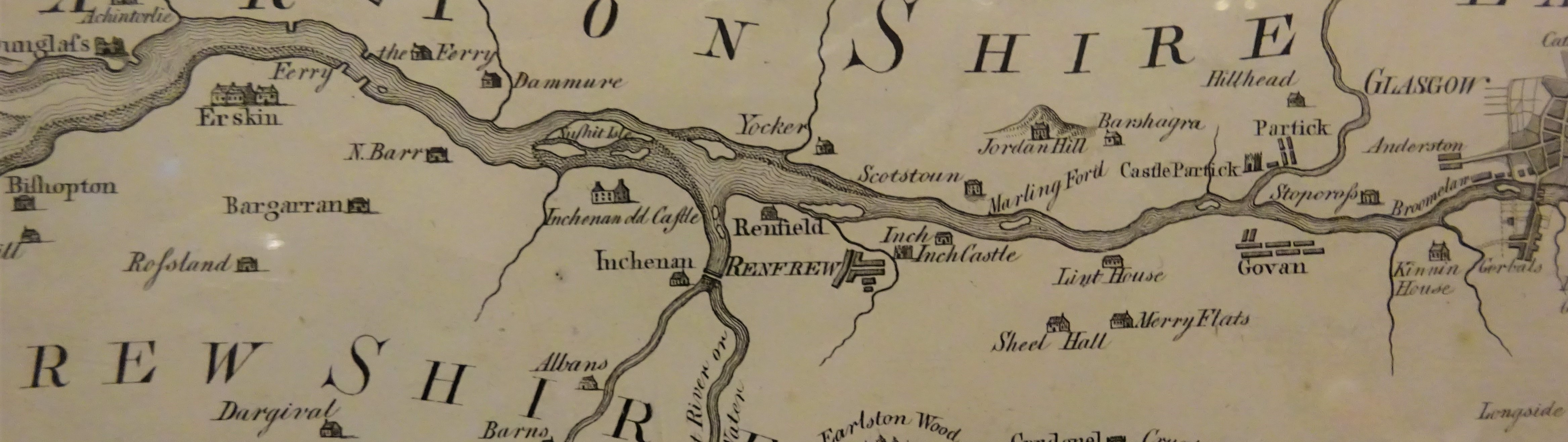
James Watt's 1736 survey of the River Clyde.

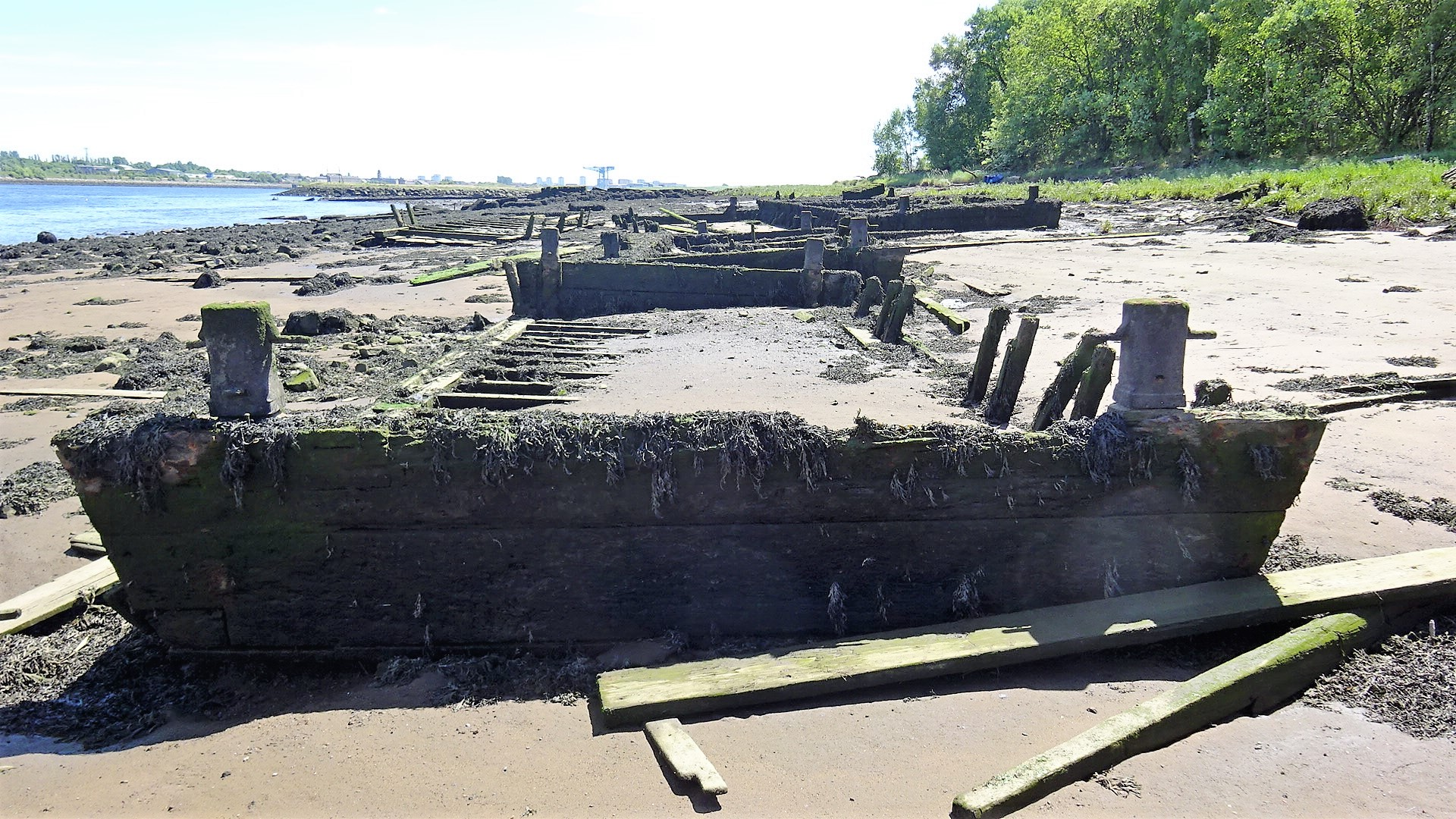
Abandoned punts at Park Quay.

The development of Glasgow as a port necessitated the deepening of the River Clyde and the removal of obstacles such as hard gravel at the Marlin Ford, etc. Dredging works produced large volumes of rocks, silt and so on that had to be disposed of as cheaply as possible. James Smith of Jordanhill owned the lands of Jordanvale and White Inch. As an experienced businessman, he struck a mutually beneficial deal with the Clyde Trust, that involved them, at a negligible cost, discarding the silt, etc. from the dredging operations into the river channel on the northern side of the island and onto the low land between Jordanvale and White Inch.

The usual dredging punts, towed by steamboats, brought the infill to the area and as a result, the ground level was artificially raised by between 10 and 15 feet (3.0 and 4.6 m). As a result, in the 1830s, White Inch ceased to be an island even during average floods.

The site of the island was used for shipyards and is now completely covered by industrial buildings.

=== The ford ===
When the Linthouse Shipyard was constructing new berths in 1913 stones were found in the Clyde and when inspected by the Old Govan Club it was concluded that they were remains of the stepping stones of the ford that once crossed from the south bank of the river. The stones ran to White Inch and then continued to the north bank.

== The Course of the River Clyde ==
The Clyde flooded in the 17th century and its course altered as recorded in the 'First Statistical Account' states that the river "left its usual course, nearly opposite to Scotstoun, took a semi-circular direction, leaving the King’s Inch on the north side, and running along the bottom of the garden belonging to the manse, came into its present direction". This suggests that the River Clyde's main current may have reduced at the White Inch's northern channel.

== Paisley Abbey ==
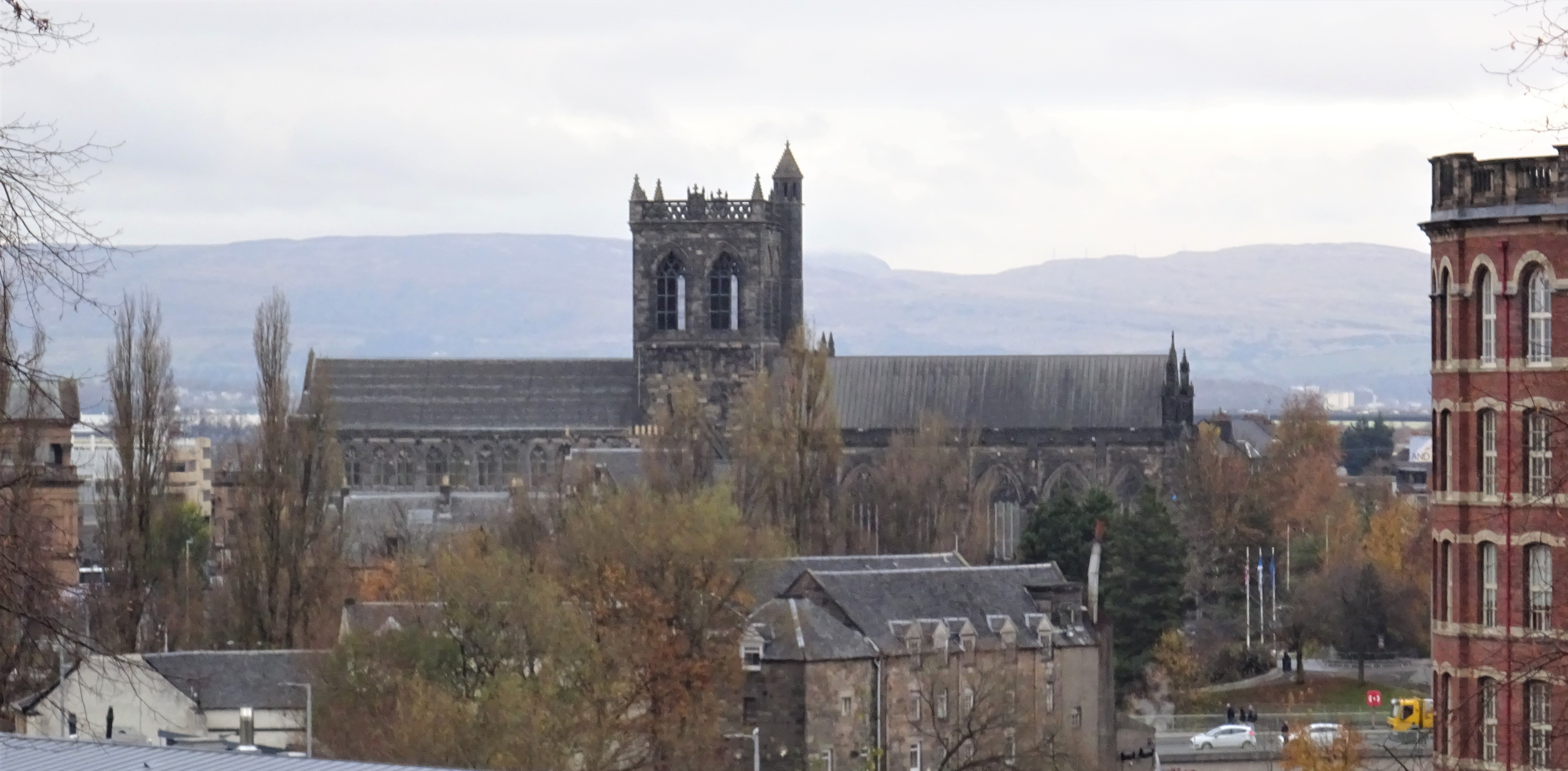
Paisley Abbey from near Blackhall.

Circa 1168 thirteen monks from Much Wenlock arrived at Renfrew and were lodged at Steward's castle on King's Inch at a church dedicated to Saints Mary and James. The accommodation at Paisley Abbey was not ready for them at the time. Osbert was appointed as the prior.

The monks had trading rights in the area and fishing rights on the River Clyde. By the year 1172, the monks had moved to Paisley Abbey. Walter Fitz Alan gave King's Inch and all the fishings on the Clyde between the island and Partick to the abbey.

== See also ==
- Bodinbo Island
- Donald's Quay
- Inchview
- King's Inch
- Milton Island
- Newshot Island
- Park Quay
- Rashielee Quay
- St Patrick's Rock
