= Newshot Island =

Former island on the River Clyde, Renfrewshire, Scotland

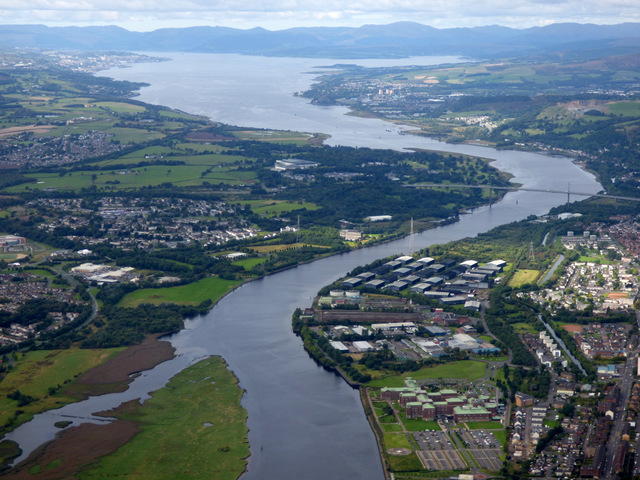
- Part of Newshot Island (foreground) from the air

Location
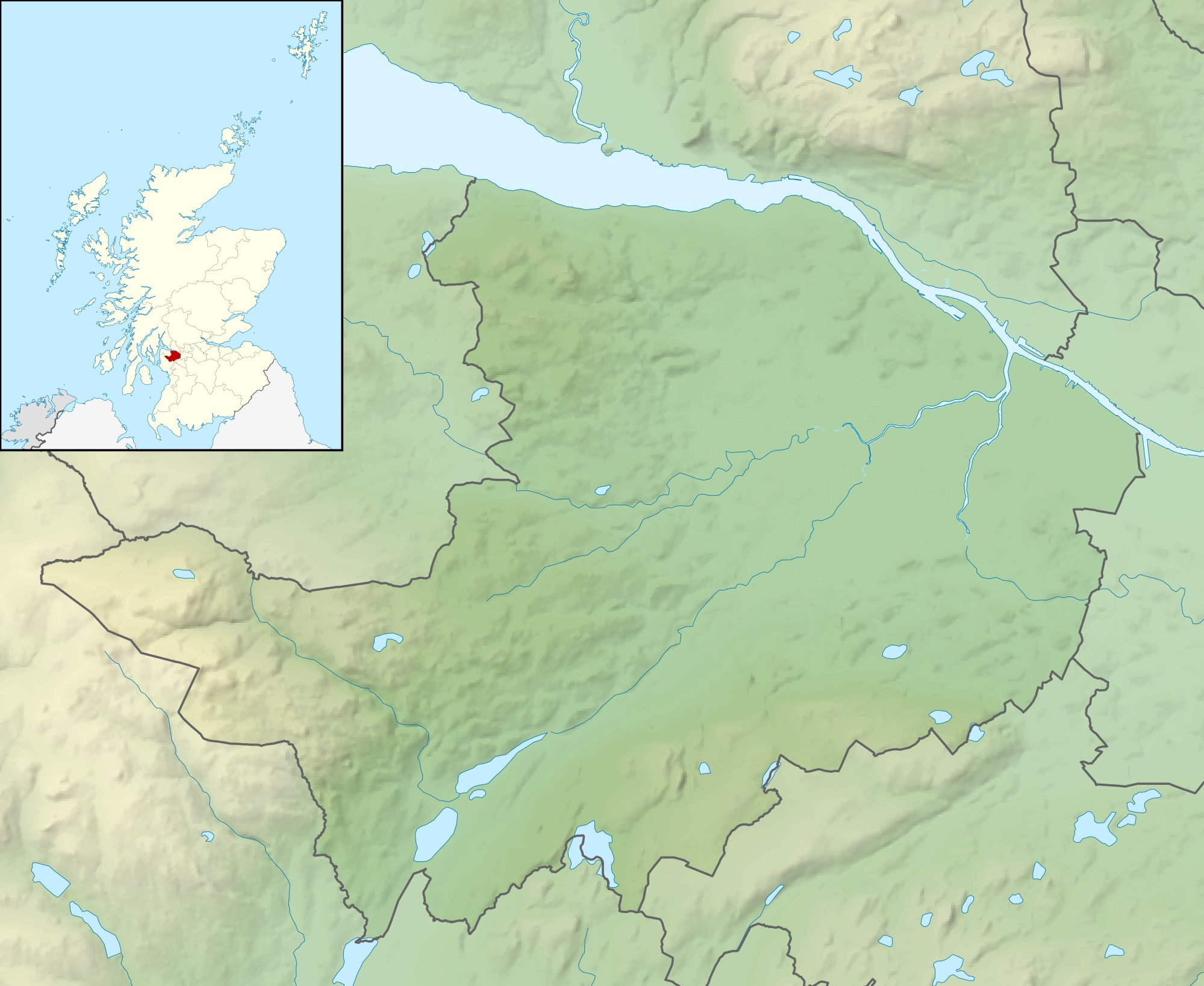
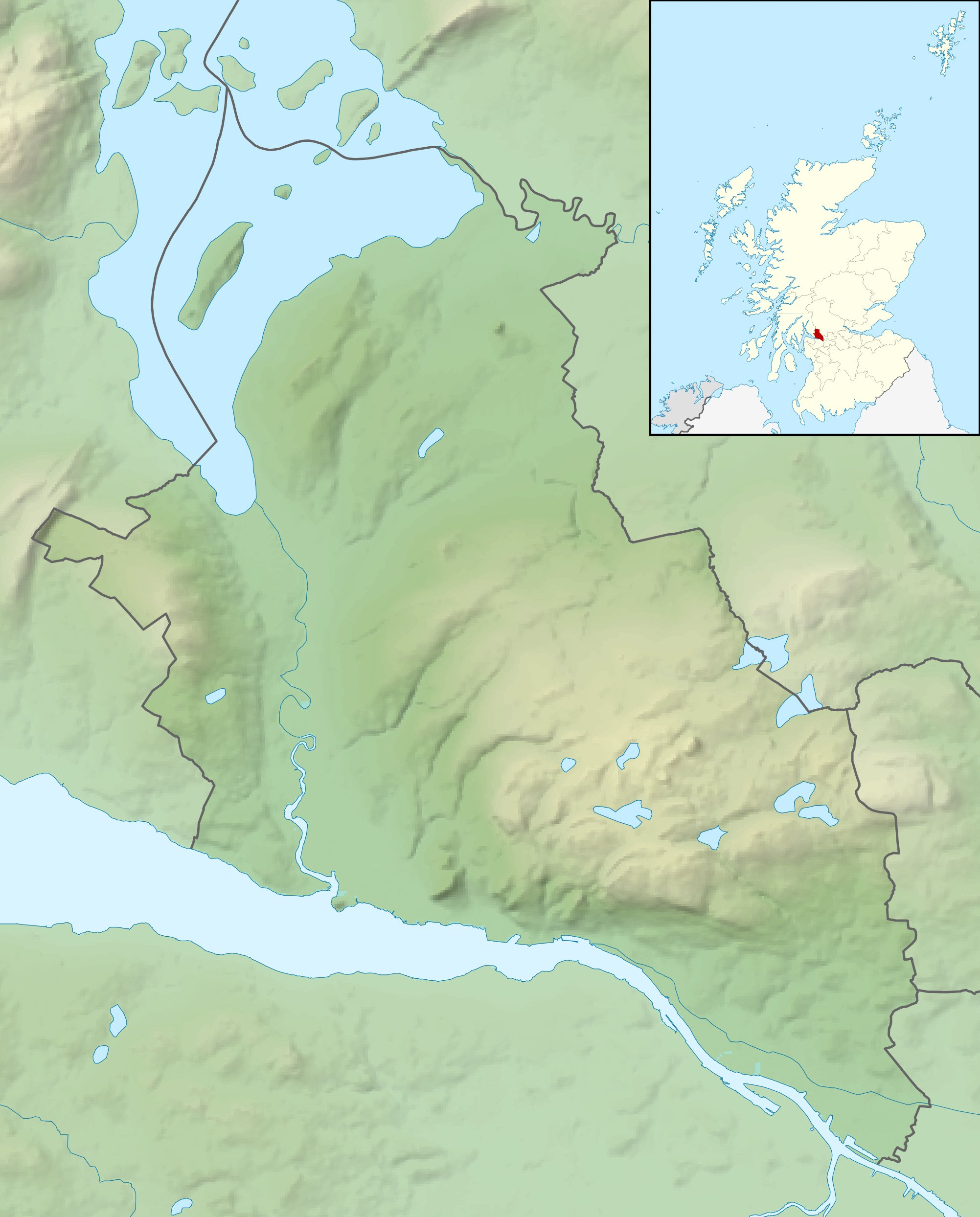
- Relief maps of Newshot Island Newshot Island (West Dunbartonshire) Newshot Island (Scotland)
- OS grid reference: NS48757011
- Coordinates: 55.9003°N 4.42068°W

Physical geography
- Island group: Islands of the River Clyde
- Area: c.3ha
- Highest elevation: <3 metres (9.8 ft)

Administration
- Council area: Renfrewshire
- Country: Scotland
- Sovereign state: United Kingdom

Demographics
- Population: 0

Newshot Island or Newshot Isle was an island about 50 acres (20 ha) in extent lying in the estuarine waters of the River Clyde close to Park Quay in the Parish of Inchinnan, Renfrewshire, Scotland. Due to silting, etc. it has become part of the southern, Renfrewshire side, of the river bank and is used for grazing cattle and as a nature reserve.

The Scots word 'shot' or its spelling variants was an ancient unit for a division of land or alternatively a projecting area of land, a peninsula. A 'Shot' also has the meaning of a place where fishing-nets were generally used and, in salmon fishing terminology, a part of the river from which nets were cast.

== Islands in the River Clyde ==
Islands of the River Clyde, rather than sand or mud banks only exposed at low water, once included in order, working upstream towards Glasgow :- Milton, Bodinbo, Newshot, Ron, Sand Inch, Kings Inch, Buck Inch, White Inch and Water Inch. A Colin's Isle once sat in the waters of the Cart near its confluence with the River Clyde.

The name 'Inch' is Scots deriving from the Gaelic 'Innis', an island. The name 'Ron' in Scots refers to a thicket of hawthorns or rose briers, an area of stunted and crowded woodland.

== Newshot Island ==
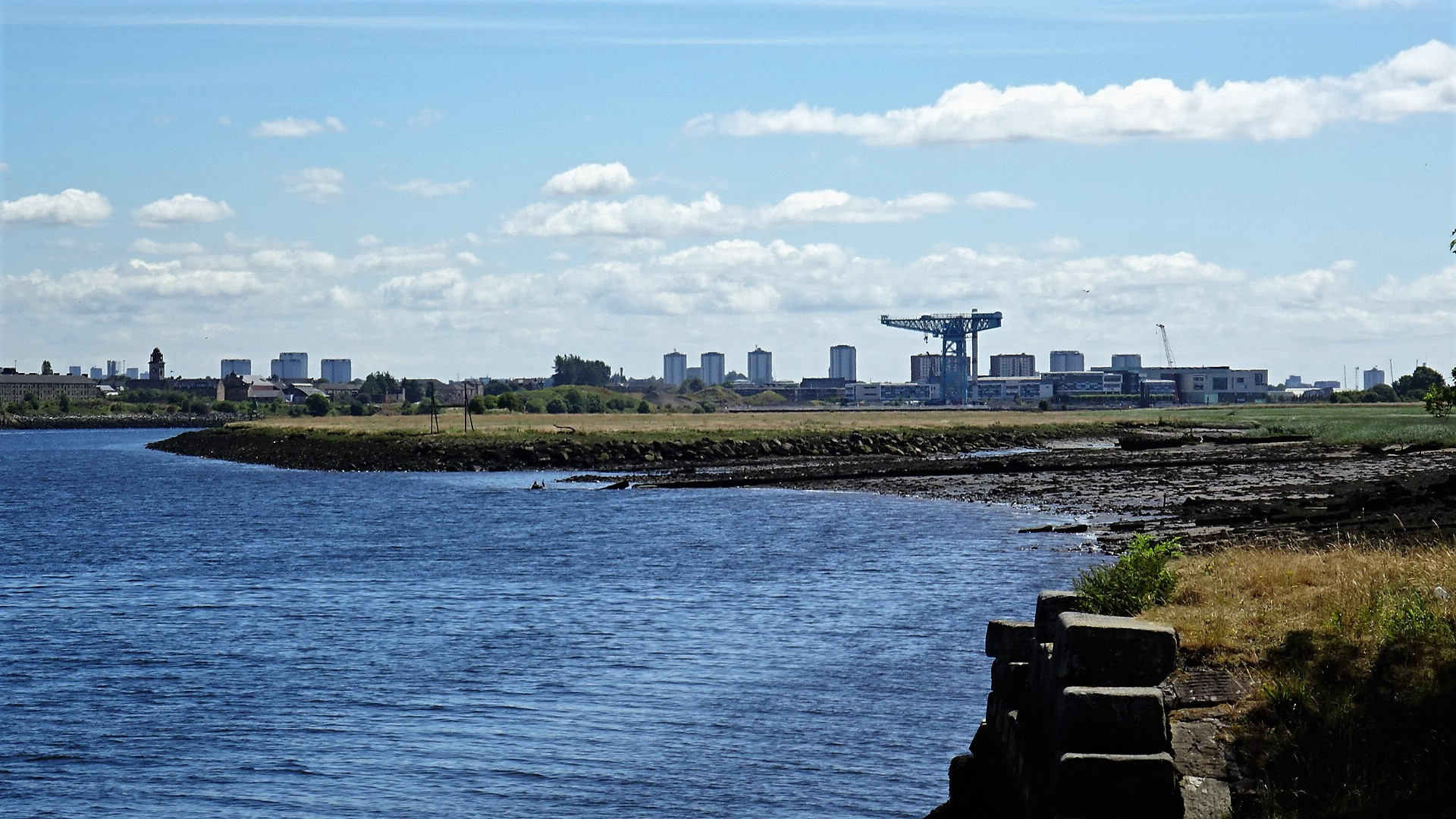
Newshot Island from Park Quay

The Palace or Castle of Inchinnan was built circa 1506 by the Darnley family. Largely still standing in 1710, it had been completely demolished by the end of the 18th century and some of its stones used in the construction of a wall built on Newshot Island. In 1745 the lands of Inchinnan, its mill and the Newshots Isles 'within the Floodmark' were granted to James Campbell of Blythswood.

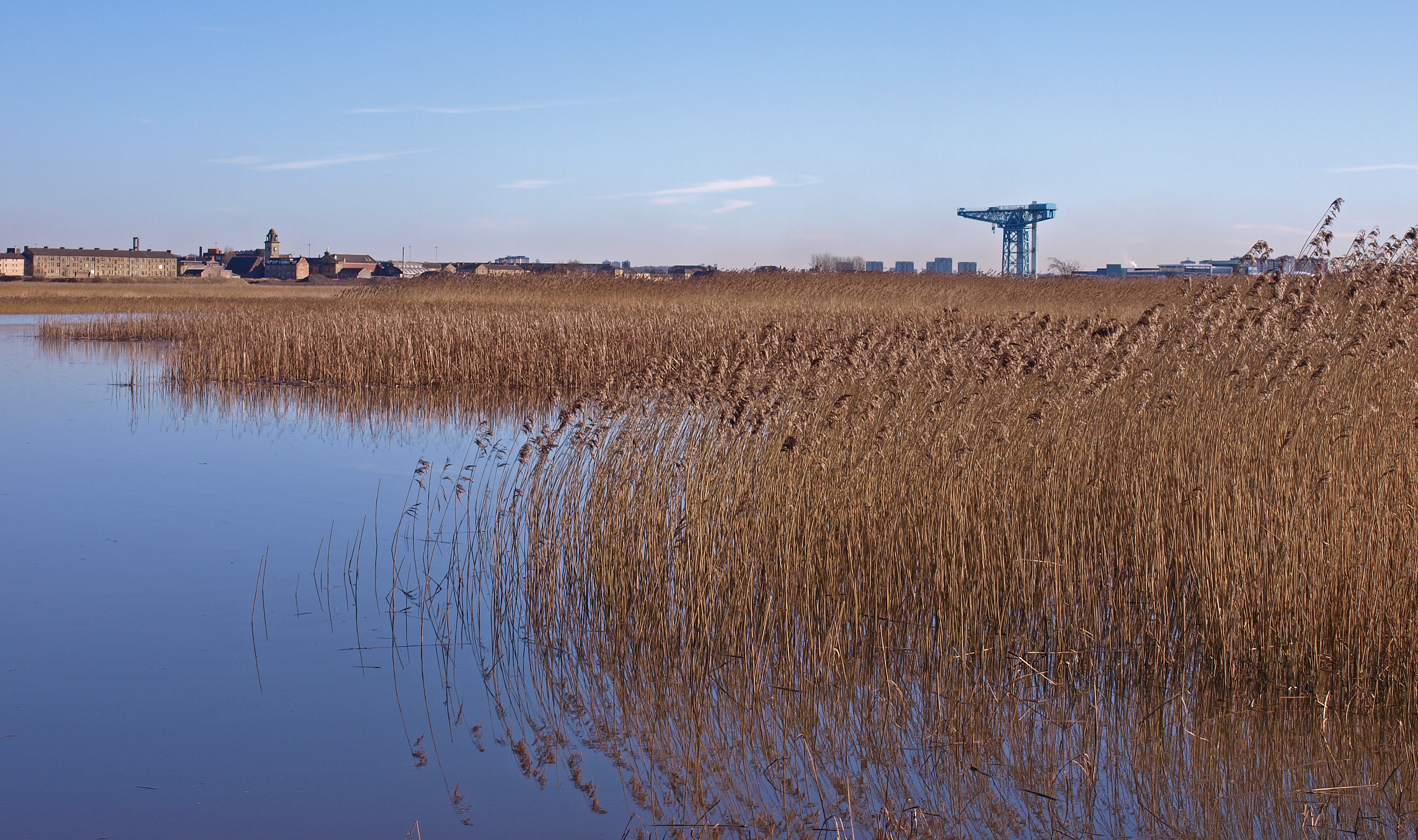
Reed beds at Newshot Island.

The farm of Garnieland, now demolished, stood near the old Palace of Inchinnan and included the lands and isles of Newshot.

Timothy Pont's early 17th century map clearly shows a single 'Neushot' island and by the mid-17th century 'New-Shot' is recorded close to Ron island and opposite Inchinnen Castle. In 1800 the island is recorded as 'Nushet'. The name is 'Newshot' is used by 1832.

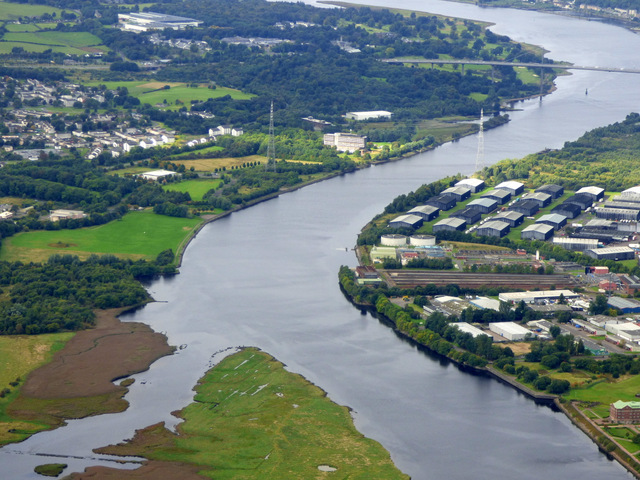
Part of Newshot Island (foreground) and Erskine Bridge

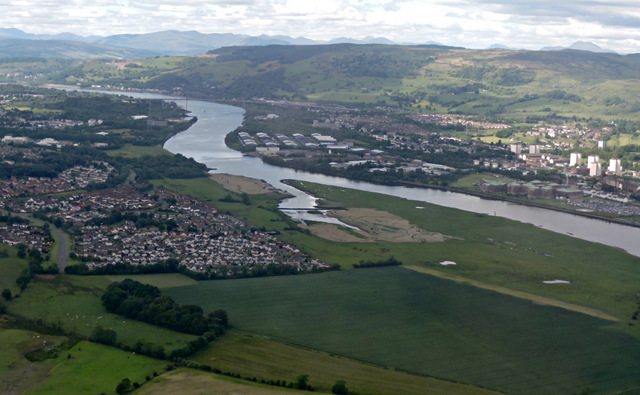
fields beside Newshot Island

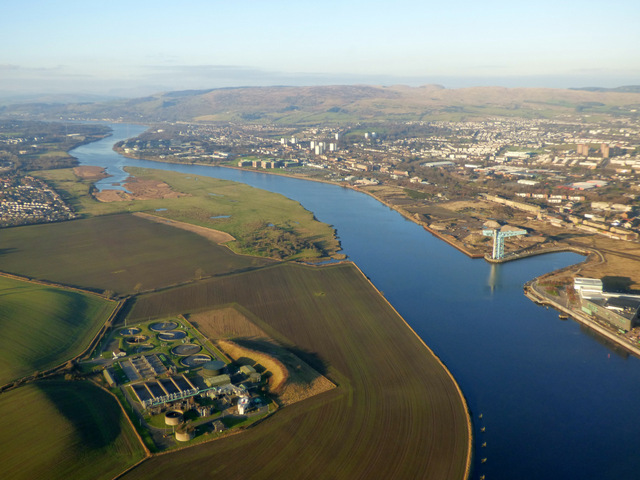
Erskine sewage works and Newshot Island

Some maps show an islet lying on the south-western side of the main island. By 1896 this islet had joined with the south bank.

A beacon or marker indicating the southernmost limit of the Clyde's deep-water channel existed in 1846 chart of the river but was absent by 1864.

The OS Name Book of 1856-1857 records Newshot Island as "An extensive and very remarkable tract of land following the course of the River Clyde about 1½ miles. On the south side, it is bounded by the "Old Channel", or former course of the above, tapering at both extremeties. The surface is quite flat, and, excepting the part covered at "High Water," may be regarded as very good pasture land."

A number of maps from 1800 show a small building on the island and at one time apparent cultivation and hedgerows or dykes. A small raised area on the isle may represent the location of the building. The first direct connection to the Garnieland Farm was a causeway or bridge built towards the upstream end of the isle in 1800 and later in the 19th century a second causeway was built, centred at (NS481702).

These causeways may have interfered with the water flow to the extent that silt deposits built up and eventually by 1896 the upstream section of the island became physically land linked to the southern bank. The old river channel thus became silted up whilst the new channel became deep enough for large ships to reach Glasgow. The old river channel also appears to have been used as a site for the mud punts to dispose of the dredgings from the docks at Glasgow.

The island has a possible fishing weir remnant built across the inner lagoon.

A WWII barrage balloon mooring anchor was located on the island.

== Ship graveyard ==
The Newshot Island site is a scheduled monument that includes wrecks of mud punts and a diving support vessel. Twenty-eight punts are located here and a circa 1852 iron-hulled dive support vessel. Immediately adjacent to the diving support vessel is a square structure. The surrounding dredged material may contain objects dredged from the River Clyde associated with the maintenance linked to the deepening of the River Clyde's navigation channels.

== The Queen Mary ==
The RMS Queen Mary briefly grounded on Newshot Isle on her journey down the Clyde after her launch on 24 March 1936.

== Wildlife ==
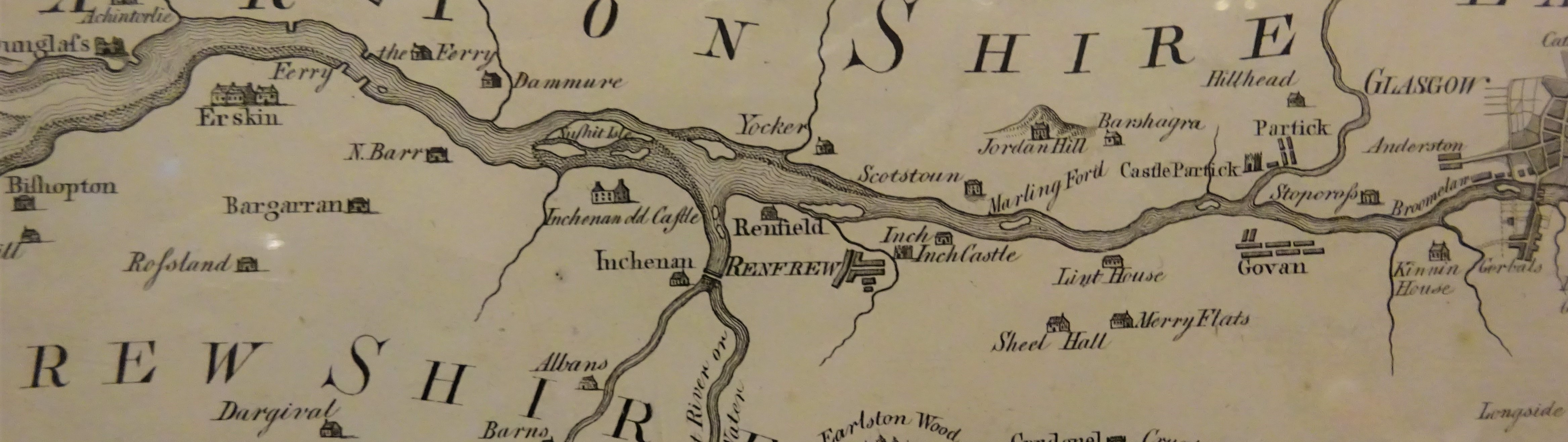
James Watt's 1736 survey of the River Clyde.

The Newshot Local Nature Reserve is a 73-hectare site that is valuable for its salt-marshes and as a feeding and nesting site for a migratory birds from North America, Siberia and West Africa.

== See also ==
- Bodinbo Island
- Donald's Quay
- King's Inch
- Milton Island
- Park Quay
- Rashielee Quay
- St Patrick's Rock
- Sand Inch
- White Inch
