= Lowest bridging point =

Bridgeable point of a river closest to the sea

The lowest bridging point (or lowest crossing point) is the location on a river which is crossed by a bridge at its closest point to the sea.

Historically—that is, before the development of engineering technology that allowed the construction of tunnels and high-level road bridges—the lowest bridging point of a river was frequently the point at which an important town or city grew up, and particularly where trade and commerce took place. The place could be served by roads on either side of the river, allowing access from a wide hinterland; had river transport available upstream; and often was at a location that allowed seagoing traffic to approach it from a downstream direction.

== Examples ==
=== Britain ===
Examples of historic lowest bridging points in Britain include:

- London (London Bridge), the lowest bridging point on the Thames;
- Lancaster, the lowest bridging point on the Lune;
- York, the lowest bridging point on the Ouse;
- Exeter (the Old Exe Bridge) on the River Exe;
- Gloucester, the lowest bridging point on the Severn.
- Glasgow grew up at the lowest bridging point on the Clyde, which was about 19 kilometres (12 mi) upstream from its lowest fording point at Dumbuck.
- Stirling, the lowest bridging point on the River Forth. Matthew Paris's map of 1247 appears to show only one bridge in the whole of Britain, located at Stirling.

=== Italy ===
Medieval Venice was centred either side of the Rialto Bridge, which was the lowest bridging point of the Grand Canal until the Ponte dell'Accademia of 1854.

== See also ==
- Head of navigation – Farthest navigable point up a waterway
- Fall line – Meeting point of uplands and coastal plain
- Spring line
