= Milton Island =

Former island in Dumbarton, Scotland

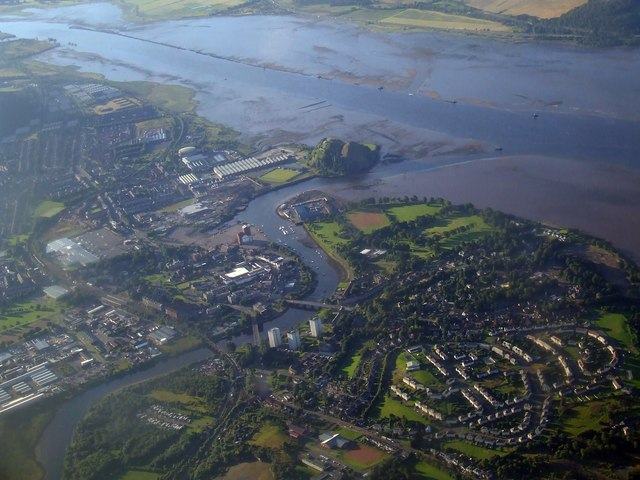
- River Clyde near Milton Island

Location
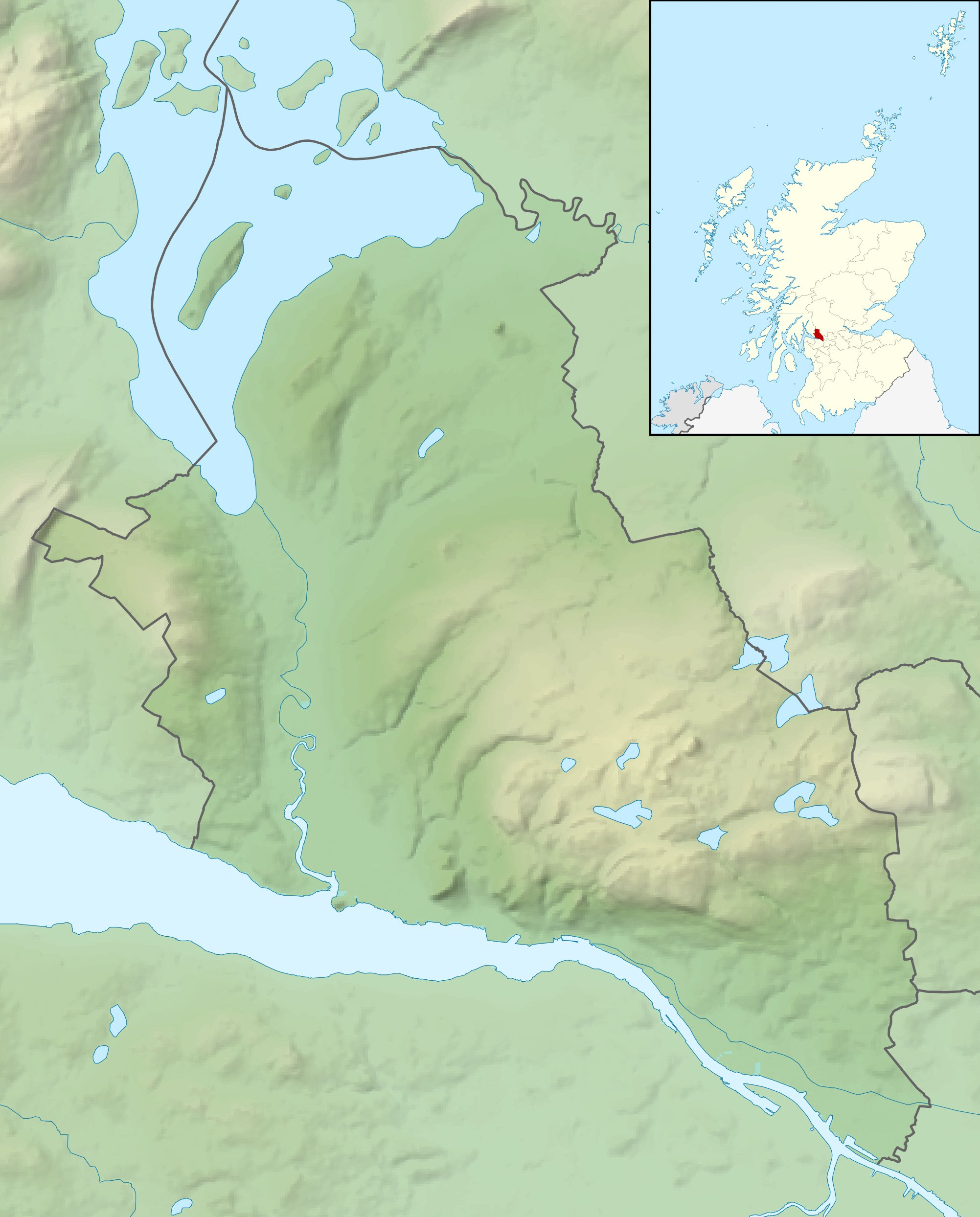
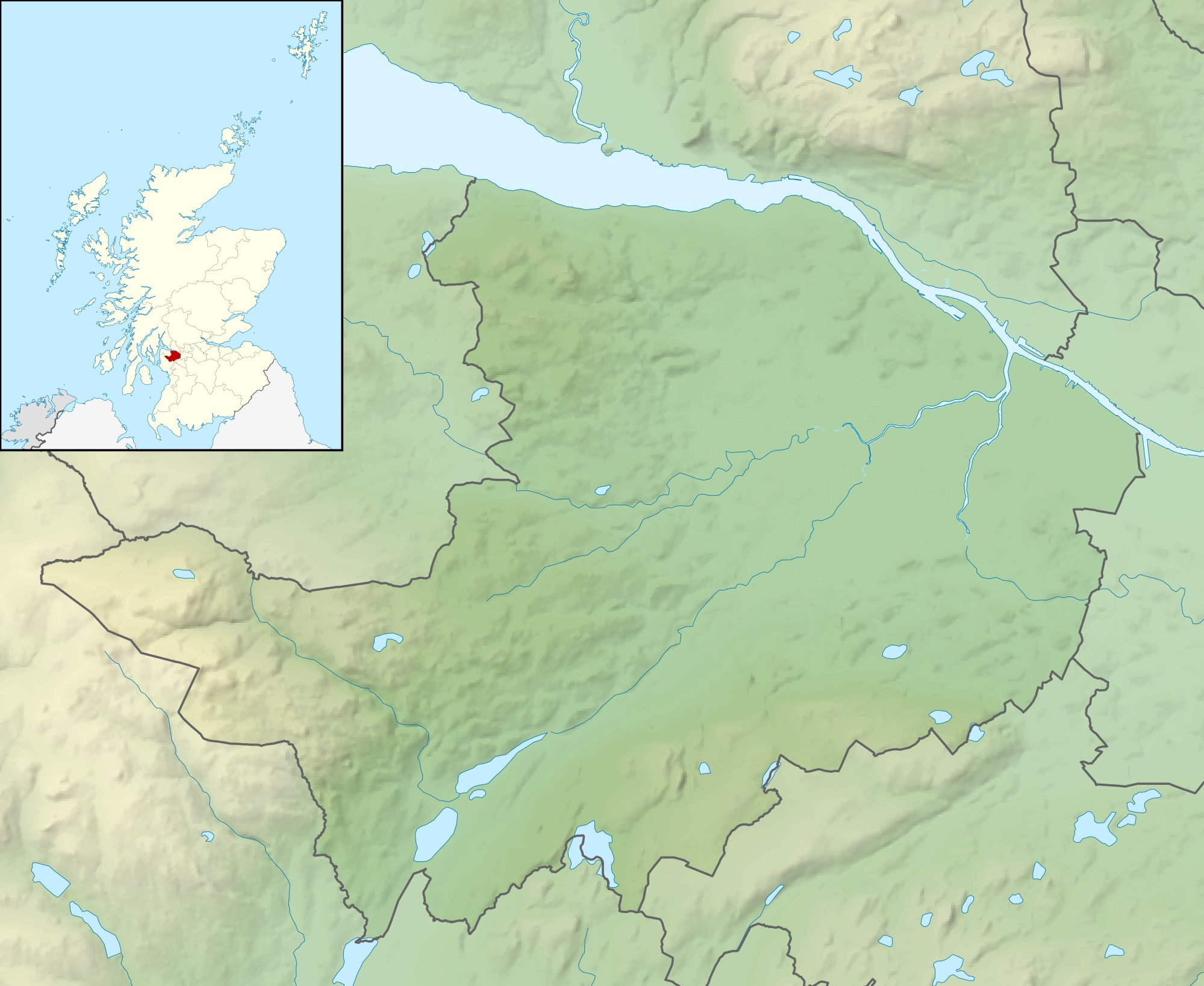
- Relief maps of Milton Island Milton Island (Renfrewshire) Milton Island (Scotland)
- OS grid reference: NS 42651 73794
- Coordinates: 55.931381°N 4.5202637°W

Physical geography
- Island group: Islands of the River Clyde
- Area: 1.852 acres (7,495 m^{2}) in 1905
- Highest elevation: <3 metres (9.8 ft)

Administration
- Council area: Dunbartonshire
- Country: Scotland
- Sovereign state: United Kingdom

Demographics
- Population: 0

Milton Island or Green Inch was an island in the Clyde's estuarine waters close to the old ford across the river at Dumbuck near Dumbarton. The island was once part of the tidal ford supposedly built by the Romans. Industrial activity has changed the river currents and the island has become substantially reduced in size and split into islets.

== Islands in the River Clyde ==
Islands of the River Clyde, rather than sand or mud banks only exposed at low water, once included in order, working upstream towards Glasgow :- Bodinbo, Newshot, Ron, Sand Inch, King's Inch, Buck Inch, White Inch and Water Inch. Colin's Isle was located in the Cart Water near its confluence with the Clyde.

The name 'Inch' is Scots deriving from the Gaelic 'Innis', an island.

== Milton Island ==
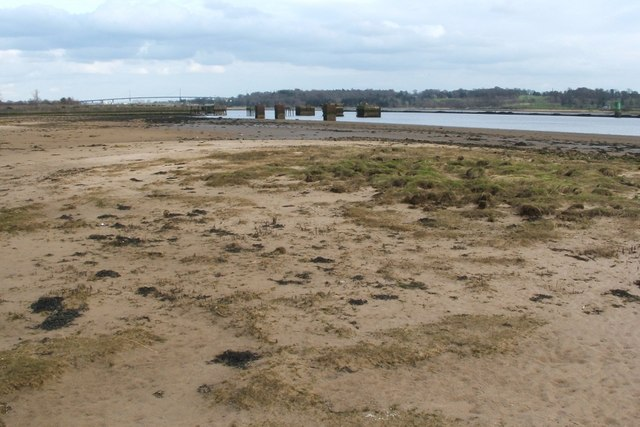
view from Milton Island

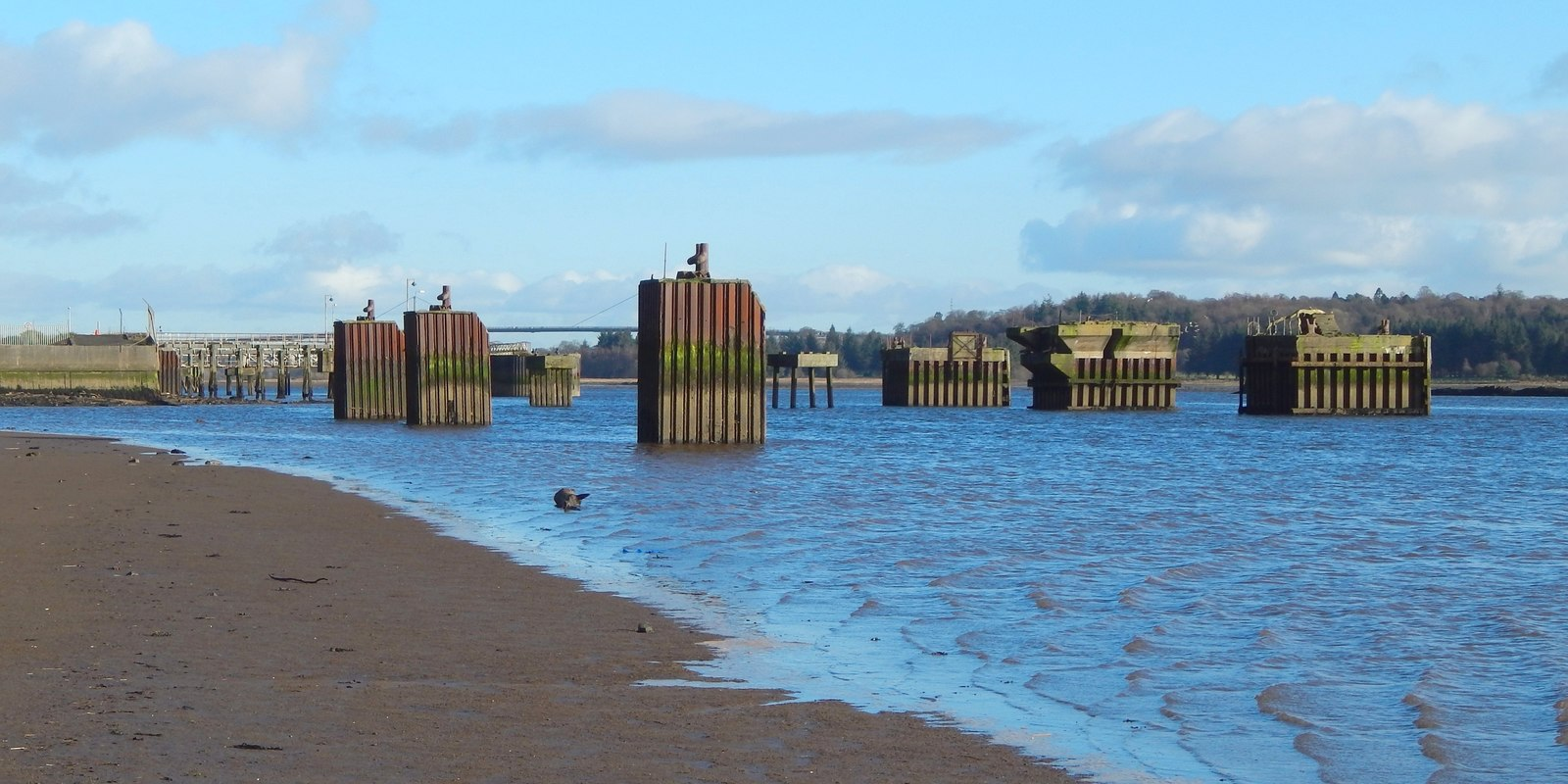
Bollards on the River Clyde

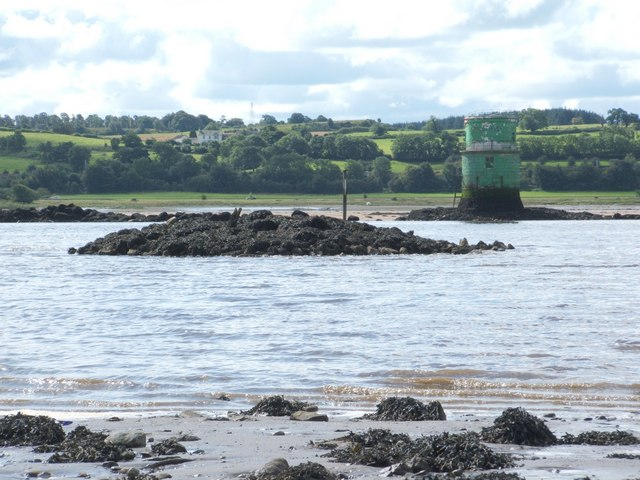
The Dumbuck Perch.

Lying between Dumbarton and Dunglass Castle below Dumbuck Hill the island is recorded as 'Green Inch' on William Roy's map of 1747–55. By 1821 the island is recorded as Millton Island, lying just off shore from the village of that name.

The Ordnance Survey Name Book of 1860 records Milton Island as "An Island in the foreshore of the Clyde at Milton from which it is named. It is never covered at High Water above the H.W.M. [High Water Mark] shewn.".

The old Esso terminal lying just upstream of Milton Island has had a significant effect on the patterns of erosion and deposition to the extent that the island is no longer a single island but of 2018 exists as three small grassy islets that lie within the larger boundary of the old island.

The Dumbuck Perch (NS 4132 7385) stands nearby as a slightly elevated area strewn with stones.

== Dumbuck Ford ==
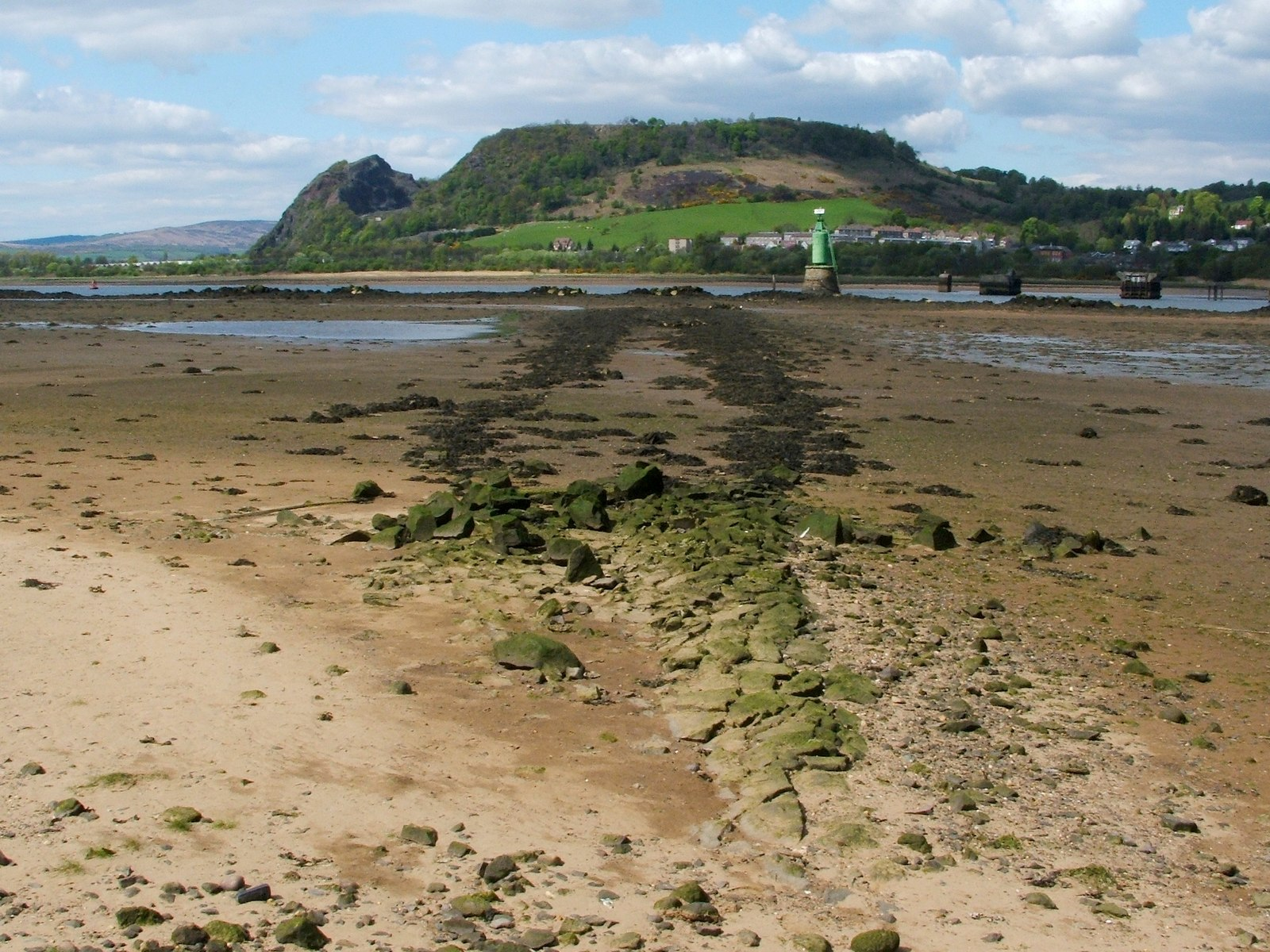
Suggested remnants of the paved Roman ford looking towards Dumbuck Hill

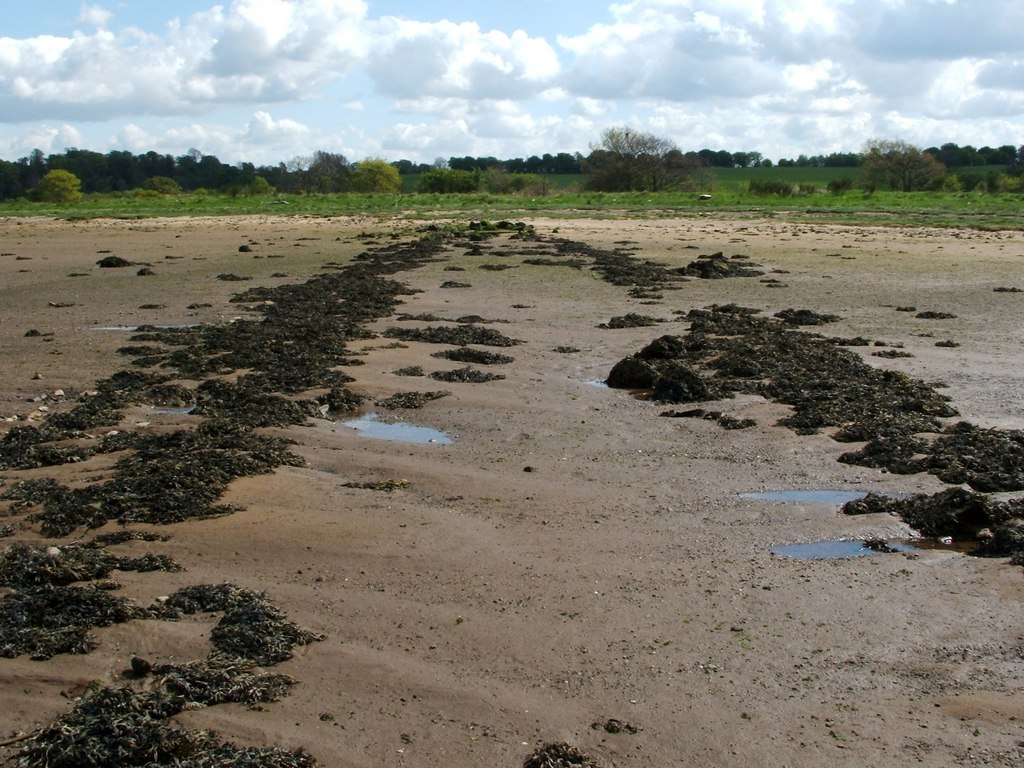
Suggested remnants of the Roman paved ford

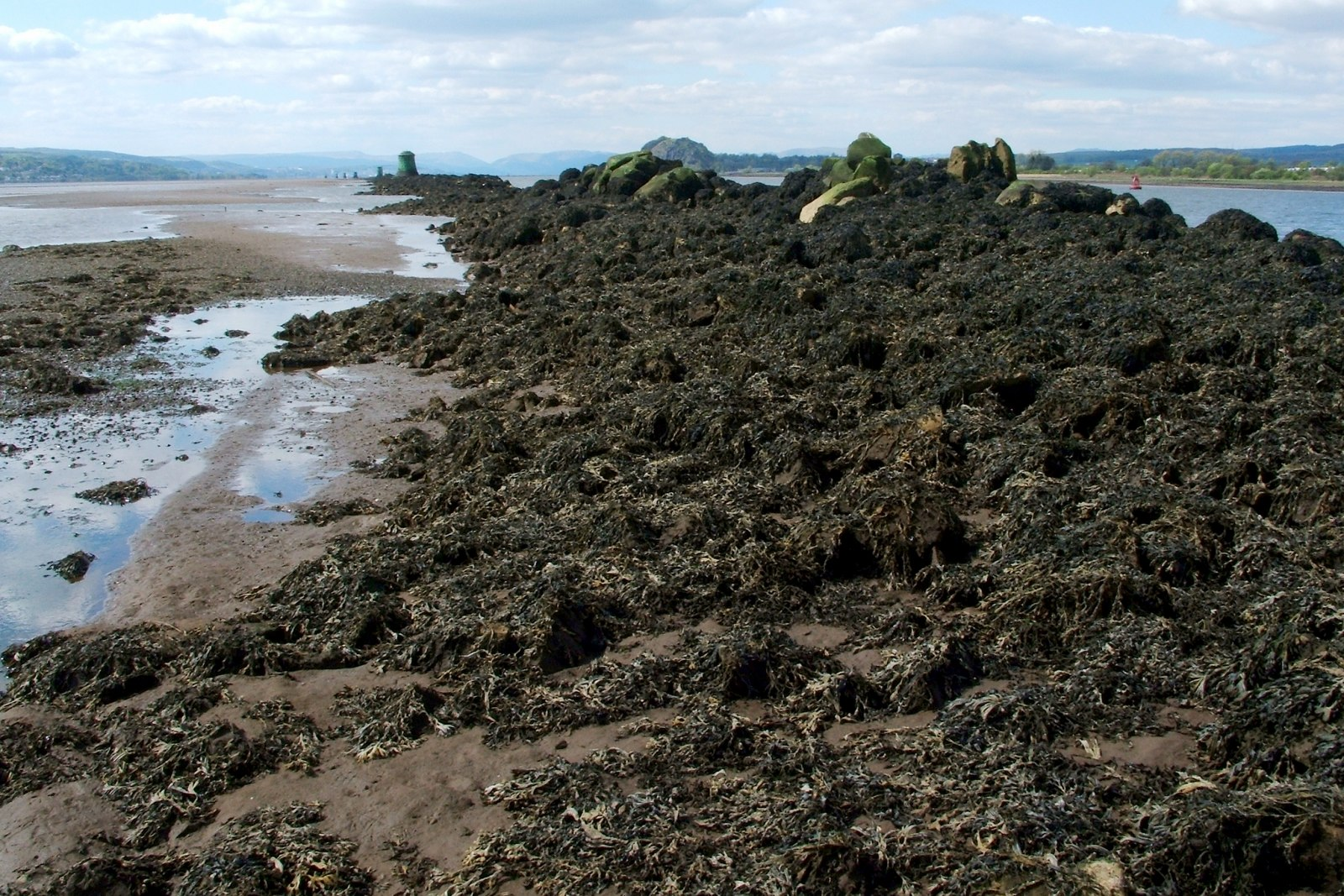
The Lang Dyke

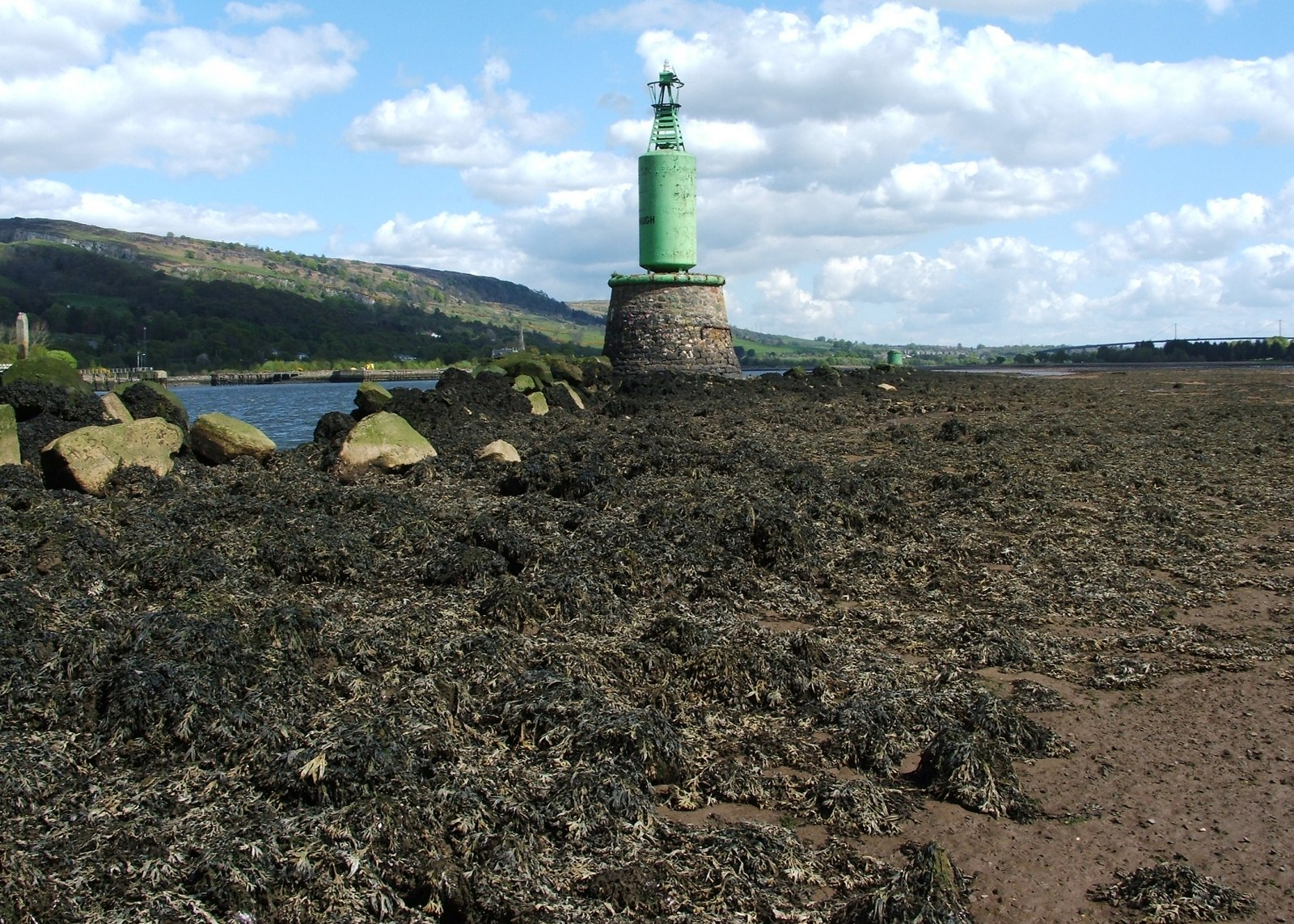
The Lang Dyke (Erskine Bridge in background)

At low tide the River Clyde at Dumbuck could be forded and in Roman times to facilitate the crossing a 7 m (23 ft) wide causeway was supposedly constructed running northwards from Longhaugh, curving through the river-dyke and passing as a low mound towards the beach. The causeway continued as with a cobbled surface atop a gravelly mound continuing towards the Long Dyke and the Longhaugh Light. It then ran across Milton Island and went on to run through a field gate and on as a low mound to Dumbarton road. North of Dumbuck some road metalling was traced. On the south side of the river it is thought that the causeway continued towards Bishopton Fort. The Romans required a link between their fort and the Antonine Wall that reached at least as far as Old Kilpatrick.

Although convenient as a means of crossing the river on foot and horseback, the shallowness of the estuary meant that larger ships could not reach Glasgow. This was the lowest fording point on the River Clyde; Glasgow was the lowest bridging point.

The Dumbuck Shoal or hirst presented a particular challenge to deepening the river channel. In the late 16th and early 17th centuries determined efforts were made to remove this gravelly sandbank but with little success. Jetties were built to encourage the water flow to scour the shoal, but again met with limited improvements in the channel's depth. However, Dumbuck Shoal remained a problem -

"The first and grand obstacle is Dumbuck Ford (12 miles below Glasgow Bridge), where, the river dividing itself into two channels, the reflowing current is greatly weakened, and the bottom, being covered with a crust of hard gravel, cannot be worn down to the proper depth; but if a jetty were extended over the south channel, to confine the current, and the hard crust of gravel removed by dredging, the reflowing current would then act with greater force, and soon grind down a deep and capacious channel."

The original 'Lang Dyke' was constructed in 1773, later using stone from the Rashielee Quarry near Park Quay, finally resulting in the loss of the Dumbuck Ford and a great improvement in the navigation to Glasgow.

In Scots 'Buck' refers to a place where water gushes or pours forth whilst the 'Dum' refers to a fort as in Dumbarton.

== Archaeology ==
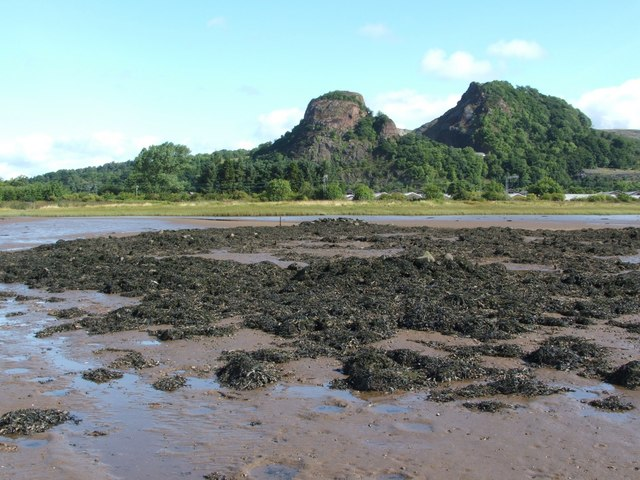
Dumbuck Crannog and Dumbuck Hill.

To the west of Milton Island lies the well known pre-Roman Dumbuck crannog-type structure. Excavations have revealed that the timber round house platform was built of layers of brushwood, earth and stone and brushwood held in place and strengthened by large wooden piles. A small log-boat dock still containing a log-boat was also found.

In 1868 an oak dug-out canoe 22 ft (6.7 m) in length and circa 2-foot-10-inch (0.86 m) was found near Milton Island containing deer horn, six stone axe heads and a possible paddle.

== See also ==
- Bodinbo Island
- Donald's Quay
- King's Inch
- Newshot Island
- Park Quay
- Rashielee Quay
- St Patrick's Rock
- Sand Inch
- White Inch
