= Bottombow Island =

Small island

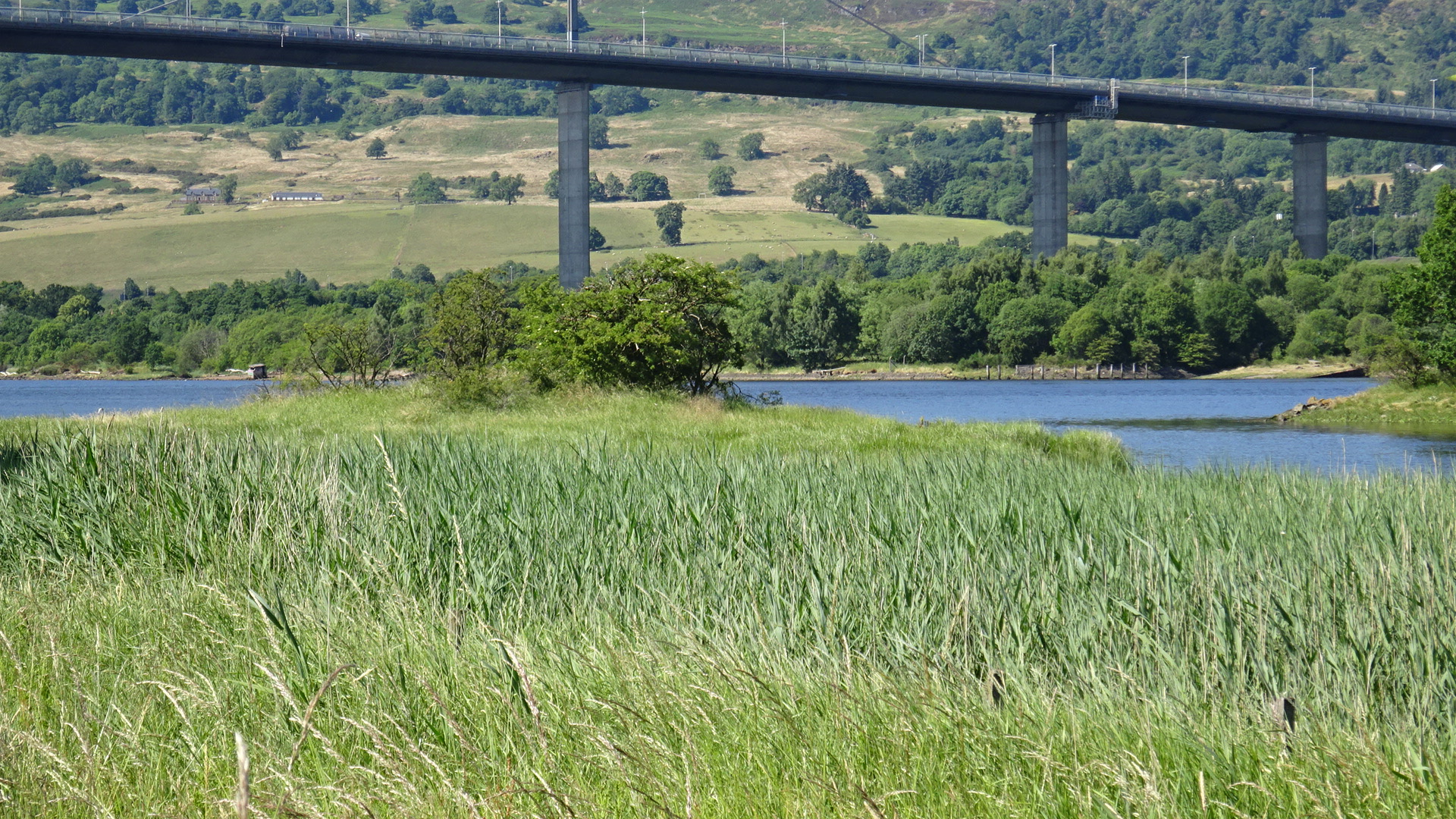
- Bottombow Island from the Clyde Coastal Path

Location
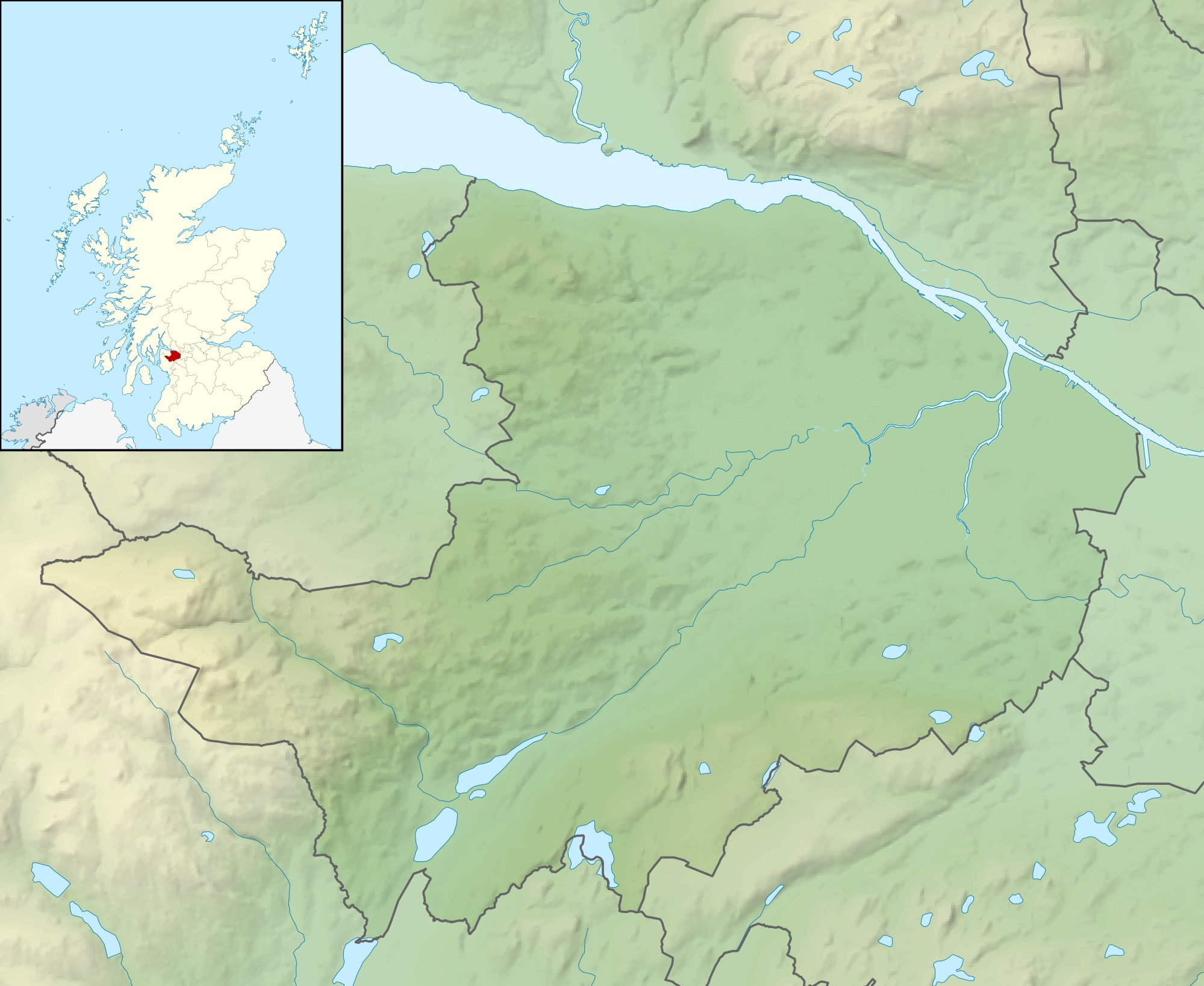
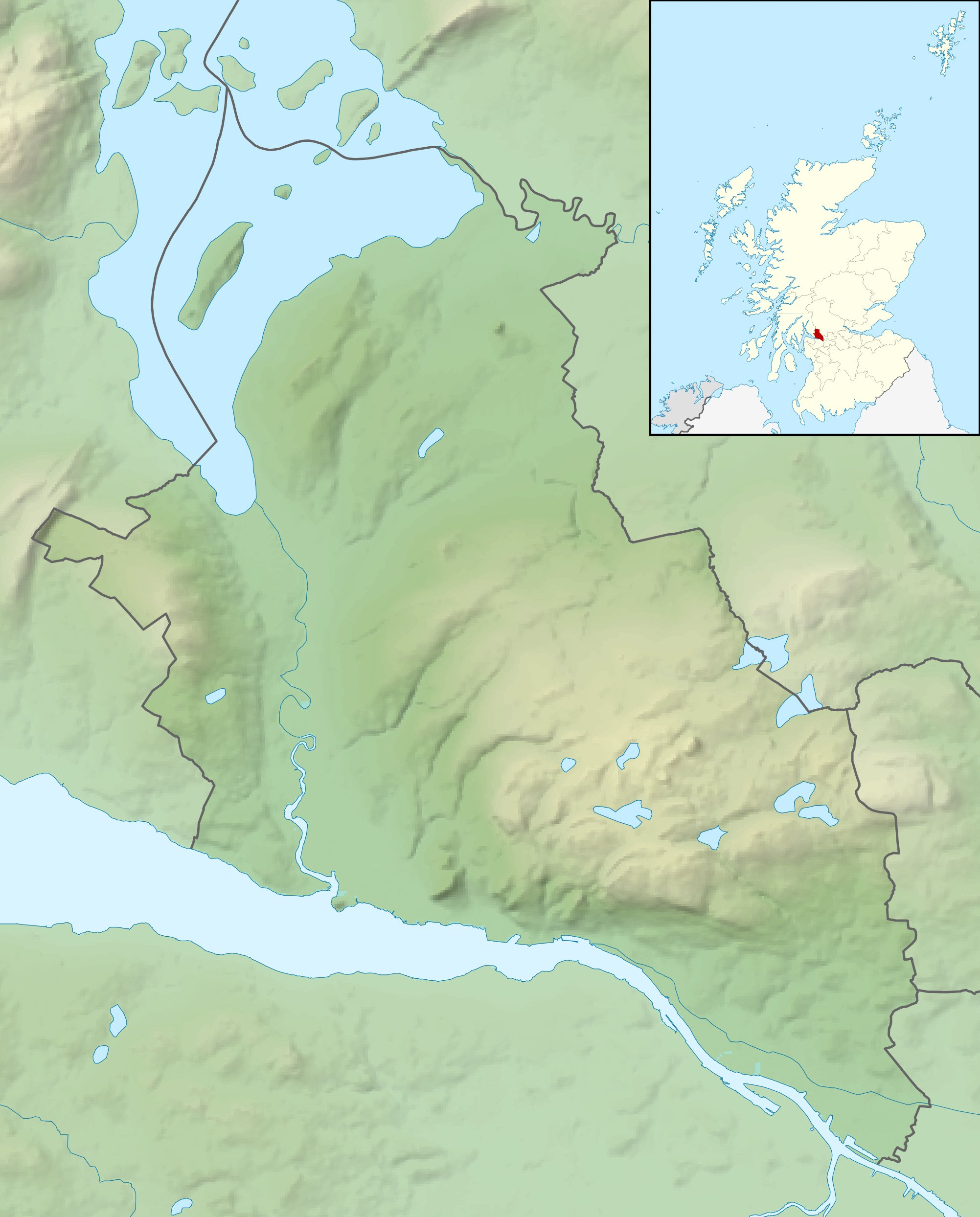
- Relief maps of Bottombow Island Bottombow Island (West Dunbartonshire) Bottombow Island (Scotland)
- OS grid reference: NS463719
- Coordinates: 55.915999°N 4.4598746°W

Physical geography
- Island group: Islands of the River Clyde
- Area: c.3ha
- Highest elevation: <3 metres (9.8 ft)

Administration
- Council area: Renfrewshire
- Country: Scotland
- Sovereign state: United Kingdom

Demographics
- Population: 0

Bottombow Island is an islet in the estuary of the River Clyde, close to the old ferry slipway at Erskine. Before the dyke or training wall was built, the rocky Bottombow Island was a prominent feature in the river hereabouts and a hazard to shipping, especially sailing craft in the dark, during foggy weather, flood conditions and in high winds.

== Islands in the River Clyde ==
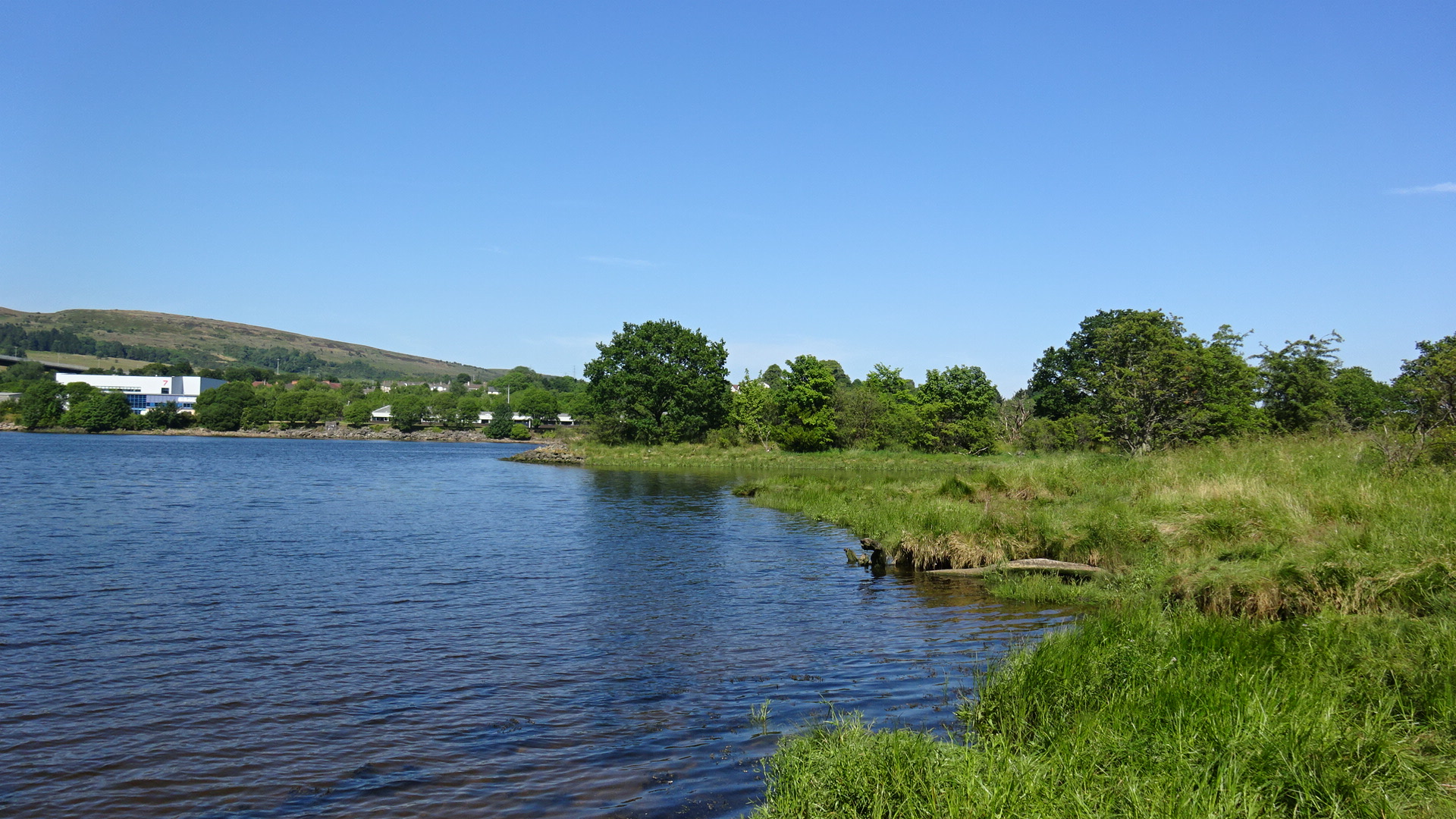
The training dike from Bottombow Island.

Islands of the River Clyde, rather than sand or mud banks only exposed at low water, once included in order, working upstream towards Glasgow: Inchgreen in Greenock, Bottombow, Newshot, Ron, Sand Inch, King's Inch, Buck Inch, White Inch and Water Inch. Green Inch or Milton Island is located at the old Dumbuck Ford near Dumbarton. Colin's Isle once sat in the waters of the Cart near its confluence with the River Clyde.

== Bottombow Island ==
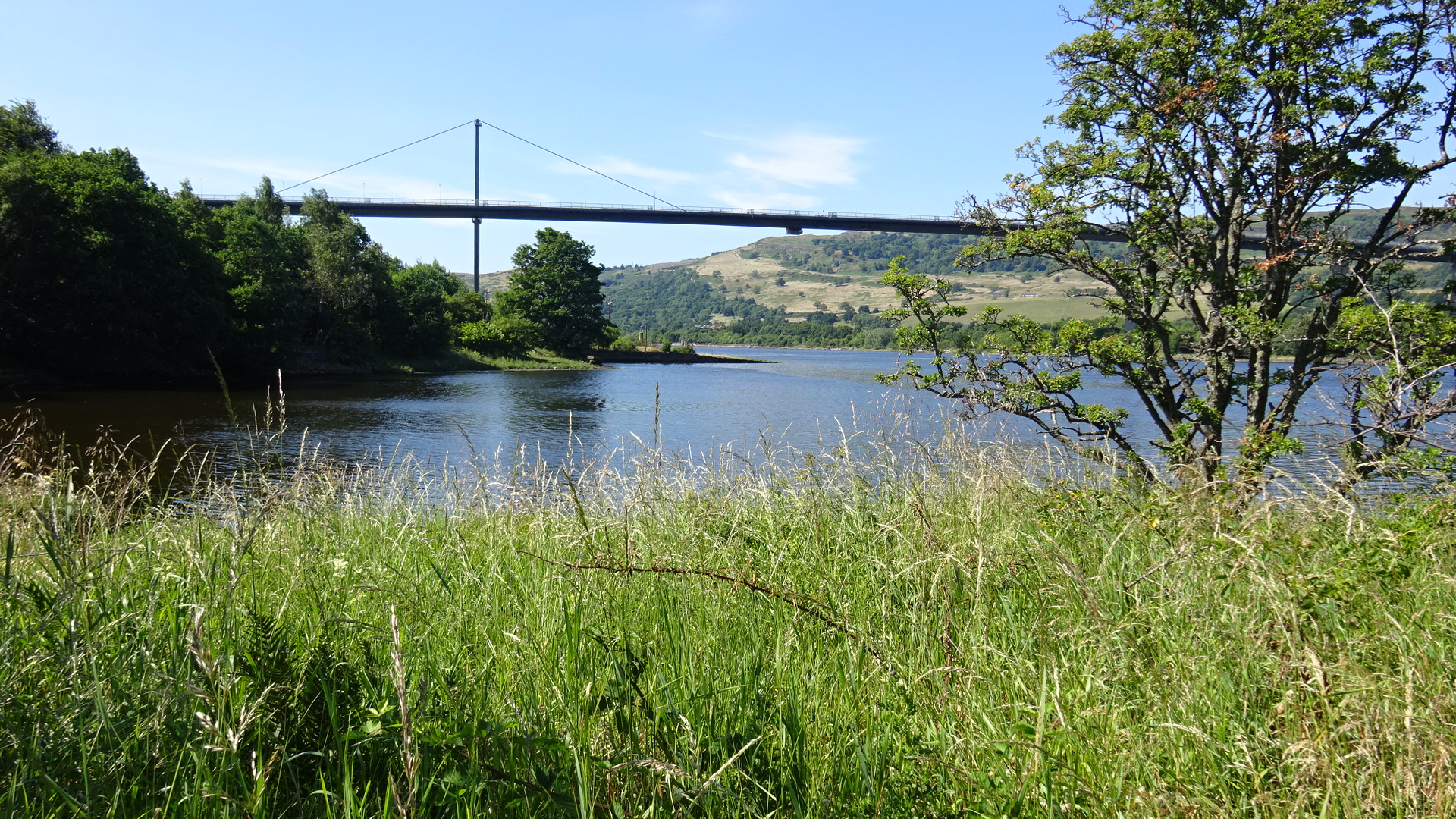
The old Erskine Ferry slipway and the bridge from the island.

The name Bodinbo is recorded on Timothy Pont's early 17th-century map and also on Joan Blaeu's 1662 maps Præfectura Renfroana and Levinia Vicecomitatus, derived from Pont's work. The island may have been included and named on these maps due to its significance as a hazard to shipping.

John Ainslie's map of 1800 shows the bow-shaped or elipsical island within the flow of the river prior to the construction of the training dike that was built circa 1857 to reduce the width of the river with a view to increasing the water current's scouring of the river bed, making it deeper and less prone to silting up. The Erskine Ferry was operational by this date; however, at this time it ran from Donald's Quay, slightly further downstream. The old bank of the River Clyde in this area runs close to the Clyde Coastal Path and is lined with trees.

The name may be Scots, as both "bod" and "bo" in place-names refer to sunken rocks or low-lying rocks on the shoreline. The island was originally bow-shaped prior to the silting up of the area behind the training dike.

The OS Name Book gives "Property Plan", "Robinson's Chart of R. Clyde", and "Hugh Paton, Ferry House" as the authorities for the name "Bottombow". The similar name "Boden Boo" is assigned to a nearby woodland plantation.

The surface area of the island is given as 0.768 of an acre or 0.31 of a hectare and the maximum height above high water mark is circa 3m or 9 ft.

An "Erskine Harbour" is marked on some maps and this has led to a degree of confusion in that the training dike, island and old river course has on occasion been mistakenly identified as a harbour and jetty.

== Wildlife ==
The area is important for its extensive reed beds and diversity of flora. The island's summit lies well above the high water mark and carries typical land based plants such as hawthorn (Crataegus monogyna) shrubs. Brackish water plants dominate the open water saltings and the surrounding silt deposits.

Newshot Nature Reserve lies near by on the banks of the River Clyde facing the old island of that name.

== See also ==
- Donald's Quay
- King's Inch
- Milton Island
- Newshot Island
- Park Quay
- Rashielee Quay
- St Patrick's Rock
- Sand Inch
- White Inch
