= Rashielee Quay =

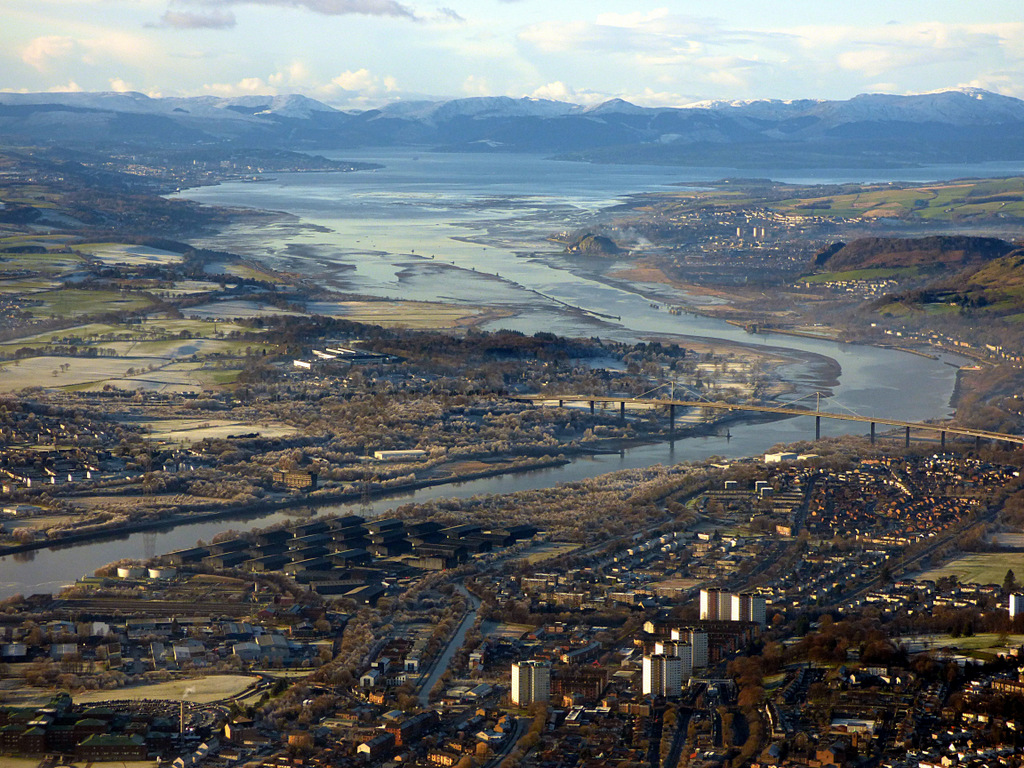
- The Clyde near Rashieliee Quay
- Interactive map of Rashielee Quay

Location
- Country: Scotland
- Location: Erskine
- Coordinates: 55.907275°N 4.4473863°W

Details
- Opened: 18th-19th century
- Operated by: Until late 19th century
- Owned by: John Henderson Esq
- Type of Harbor: Private

Statistics
- Passenger traffic: No

The old Rashielee Quay or Rashielie Quay (NS471709) was a Scottish quay, located on the old Lands of North Barr, situated on the south bank of the River Clyde in the Parish of Inchinnan, between Bodinbo Island and Park Quay. It was built to facilitate the loading of boats and barges with whinstone excavated from the nearby Rashielee Quarries that was brought to the quay by a horse drawn wagonway.

== History ==
=== The Lands of Rashielee ===
In 1497 Rashielee, North Barr, Craigton and Barscube were obtained by charter from the Darnley's, Earls of Lennox by the Stewarts of Barscube. This family held the lands until around 1670 when most of the estate was sold by Thomas Stewart to a wealthy Glasgow merchant, Donald Mac Gilchrist, who built the old North Barr House in 1676. They then passed to the Balfours, Lord Sempill in 1741, John Buchanan in 1798 and Lord Blantyre of Erskine House in 1812. In 1843 Mr Maxwell of Dargevel was the proprietor of the property.

In 1856 John Henderson was the owner of Rashielee Plantation and Rashielee Quarry although Rashielee Farm and offices were held by a John Hamilton Esq.

The word 'Rashie' is Scots for an area or field filled with rushes.

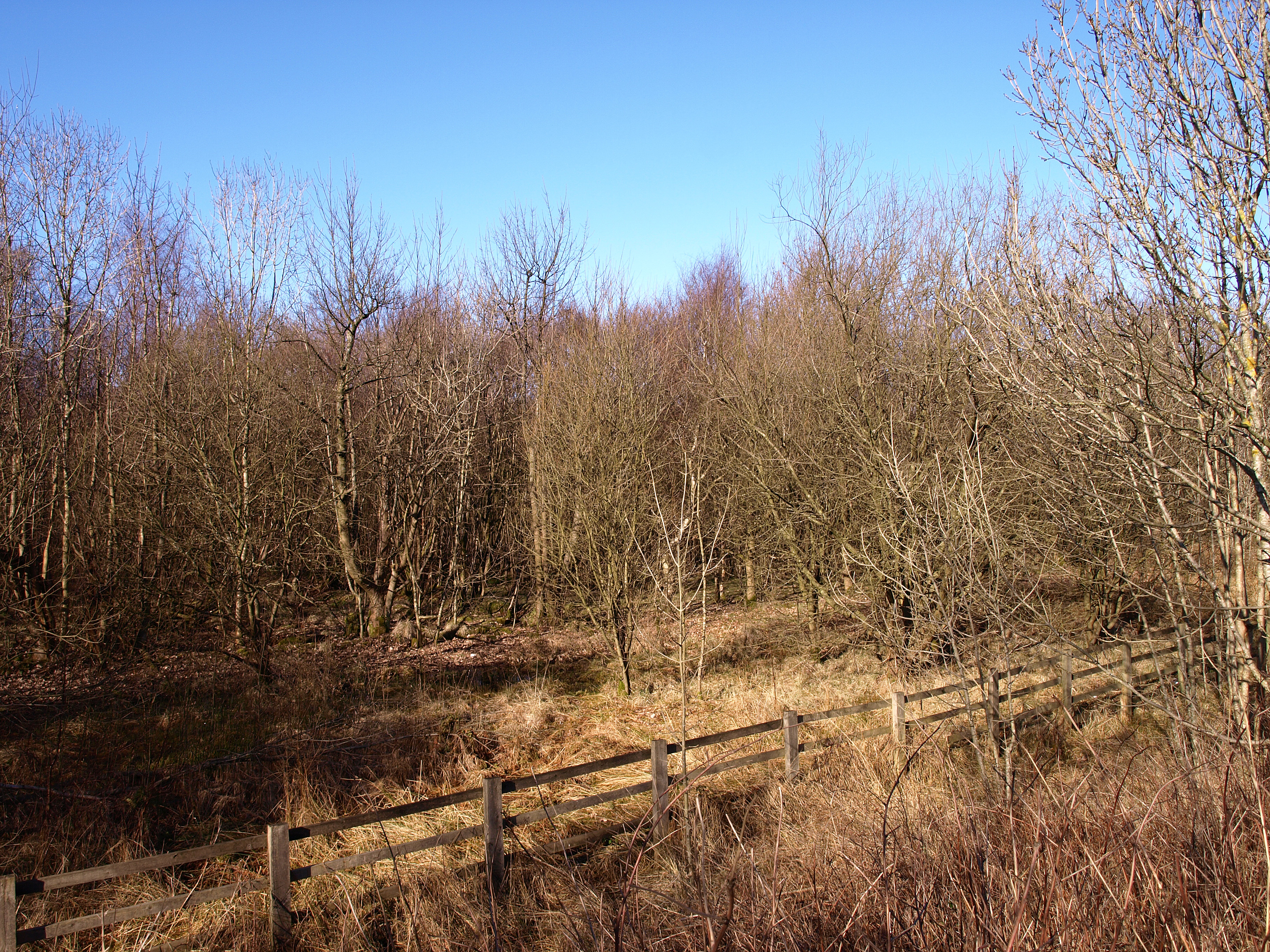
Rushielee Plantation.

== Rashielee Quarries ==
The two long and narrow quarries utilised stone from two linear dikes (igneous intrusions) that run through area at least as far as the site of the old quay. Due to its hard wearing characteristics whinstone is widely used for pavements, road building, jetties, etc.

Construction of the training wall known as the 'Lang Dyke' below the Erskine Bridge started in 1773. All the whinstone had to be floated down to the site on barges at the slack tide and placed underwater. The dyke was added to in later years on the west end using whinstone from the Rashielee Quarries.

The whinstone from the Rashielee quarries is from the same lava flows that formed the Renfrewshire Hills. Circa 1810 its whinstone was used as stated for a westward extension of the Lang Dyke and also the anti-erosion surfacing of other training walls, etc. in the River Clyde such as the one near Bodinbo Island close to the southern side of the old Erskine Ferry.

The quarries had been abandoned by 1881 when a drop in the population of the parish is recorded as being due to the unemployment caused by this closure.

Some of the quarry faces are still visible from the pedestrian paths that now run through the landscaped site.

== Rashielee Quay ==
=== Description of the quay, dock and wagonway ===
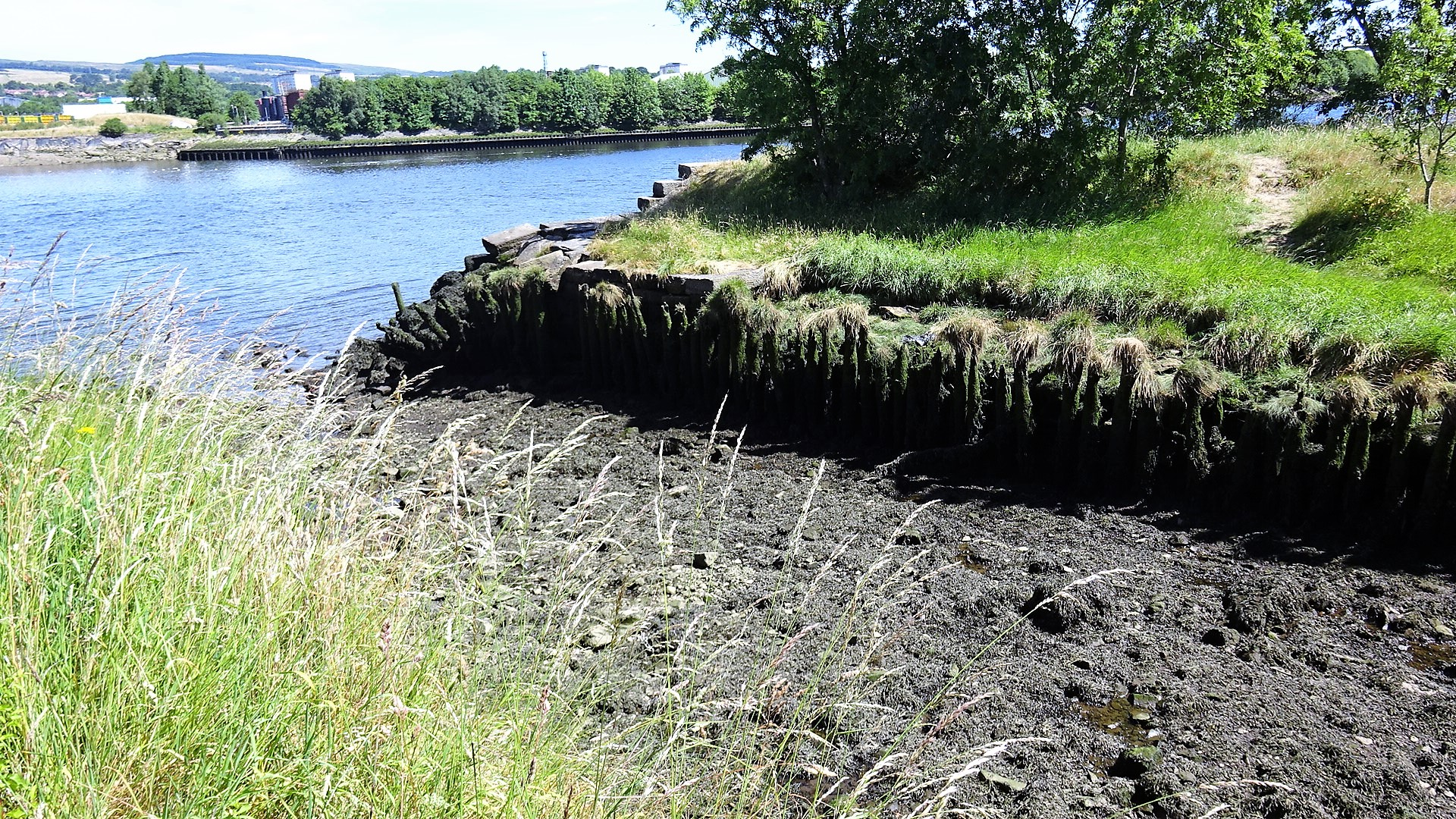
Park Quay may have built with Rashielee whinstone.

The quay was built to provide loading facilities for ships and punts collecting stone for use along the course of the River Clyde.

In 1857 track ran from both quarries towards the quay, dividing into several sidings and ending where a crane was located and a beacon together with several berths including a dock or basin. A building was located within the eastern quarry. By 1895 the quarries were abandoned, the track lifted and the quay apparently abandoned although a crane is still marked.

Rashielee Cottages are shown at a location where a building had been present when the quarries were operational.

In 1939 the quay is officially marked on the OS maps as disused. The quay has been infilled and landscaped however much of the dressed stone from the old quay has been used in the landscaping.

Rashielee Light stands on a cast iron cylinder close to Park Quay. Once oil fueled, it was later converted to compressed gas and now powered by electricity.

== WWII ==
Location of Rashielee Quay, Renfrewshire

A WWII barrage balloon site was identified in the area however nothing now remains of the structure. Many barrage balloons existed in this part of the clyde to protect people, housing and industries against German aircraft.

== See also ==
- Bodinbo Island
- Donald's Quay
- Milton Island
- Newshot Island
- Park Quay
- St Patrick's Rock
