= Park Quay =

Park or Fulton's Quay
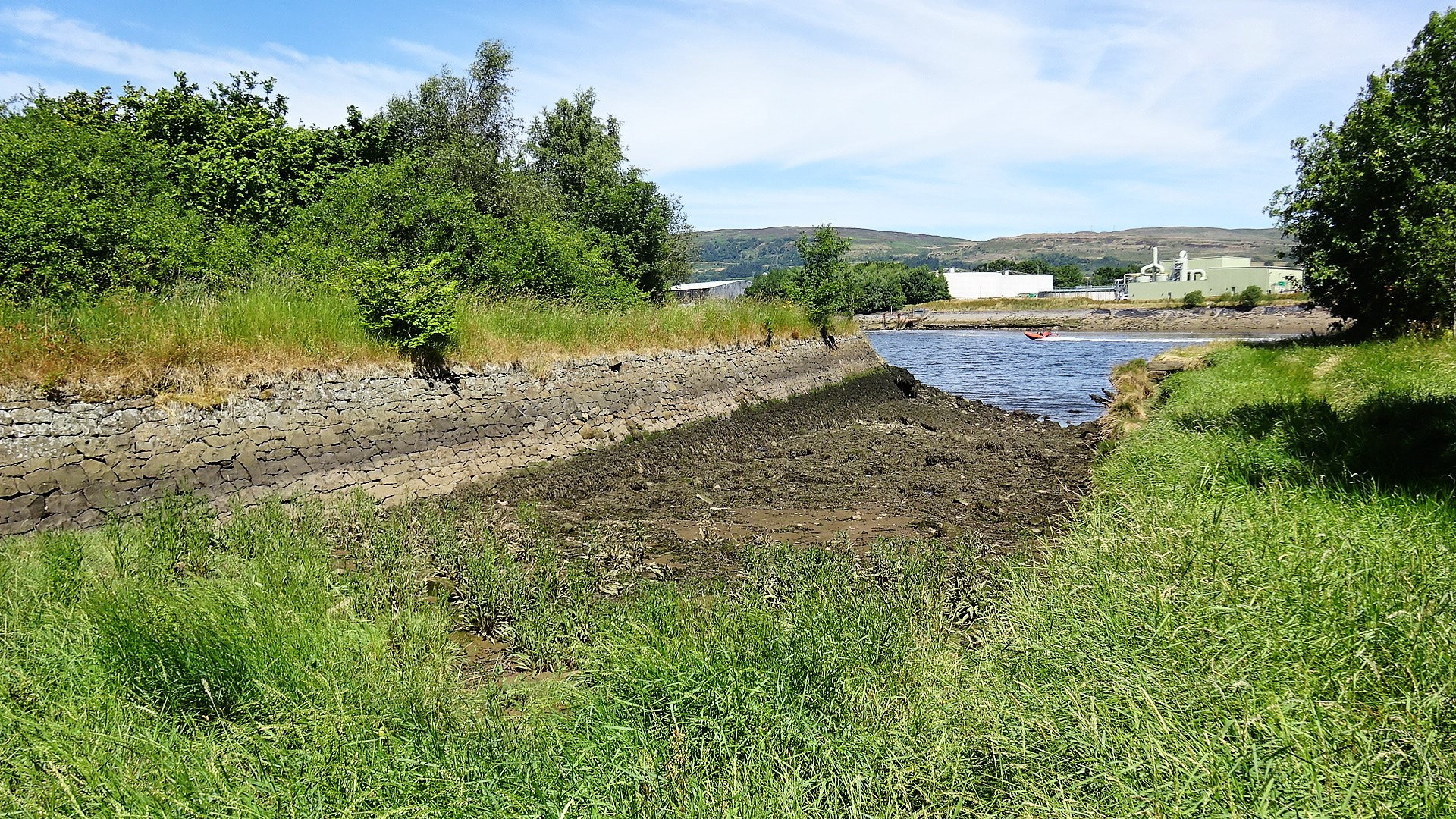
- Park Quay & basin
- Interactive map of Park or Fulton's Quay

Location
- Country: Scotland
- Location: Erskine
- Coordinates: 55.904947°N 4.4417902°W

Details
- Opened: 18th-19th century
- Operated by: Until 20th century
- Owned by: Park Estate
- Type of harbour: Private
- No. of berths: One
- No. of piers: One

The disused Park Quay or Fulton's Quay (NS 47436 70692) is located on the old Lands of Park, situated on the south bank of the River Clyde in the Parish of Inchinnan, close to Newshot Island and the old Rashielee Quay. A slipway is also part of the infrastructure, giving access to the dock at low tide, both once served by roads running through the Park Estate from the south. It was recorded as Fulton's Quay in 1830, the name of a previous owner of the Park Estate who may have built it prior to 1801. A fixed light was installed at Park Quay in 1869.

== History ==
=== The Lands of Park ===
William Park of that ilk lived during the reign of James IV (1473 – 1513) and had no male heir, leaving the lands of Park to his three daughters. His eldest daughter inherited Park and she married Robert Cunningham of Auchenhervie. The couple had a single child, a daughter Janet, who married George Houston and the lands then passed to a Cunninghame of Craigends.

In 1768 a Campbell of Bredalbane acquired Park from John Sommerville. The estate was considerably improved at this time and the mansion house was built. Humphrey Fulton of Hartfield amassed a considerable fortune through setting up silk manufacturing in Paisley and his son William became the owner of Park in Inchinnan in 1789. John King of Millbank acquired Park in 1801 and then it was owned by Mr W.T. Lithgow, owner of the famous shipbuilding firm by 1905. The family's main home was at Langbank and William died in 1908. The woods were cut down and Park House was demolished to make way for the housing estates that now occupy the grounds.

=== Park Quay ===
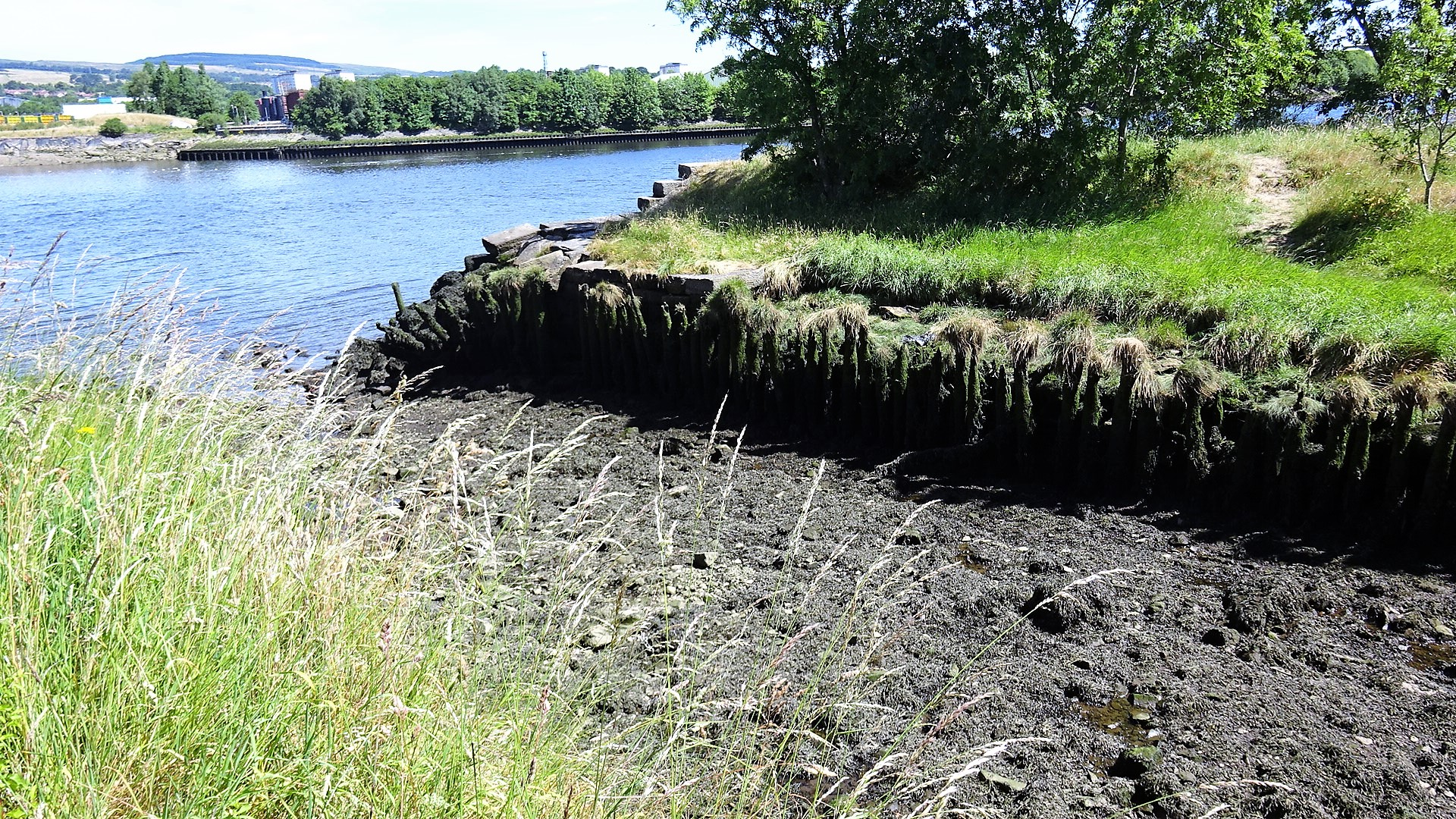
The Park Quay from the west.

Roy's circa 1755 map shows Park House, but no quay is indicated. In Ainslie's map of 1800, a road is seen running to the river from Park House but no quay is shown; Thomson's map of 1826 shows the same details. The quay first appears on a Lizar's 1818 map lying on the Park Estate and accessed by a road running from the mansion house and the local roads with the estate's North Lodge controlling the road into the Park House grounds by 1857. The name 'Fulton's Quay' indicates that it was built for the private use of the Park Estate between 1789 and 1801 and no obvious use in relation to quarrying or mining is apparent, unlike the nearby Rashielee Quay which was rail connected to whinstone quarries in 1857. It may have continued in use until the 20th century. By the late 1930s the beacon and quay were no longer marked on maps and the road to Park House had been truncated.

== Description of the quay, dock and slipway ==
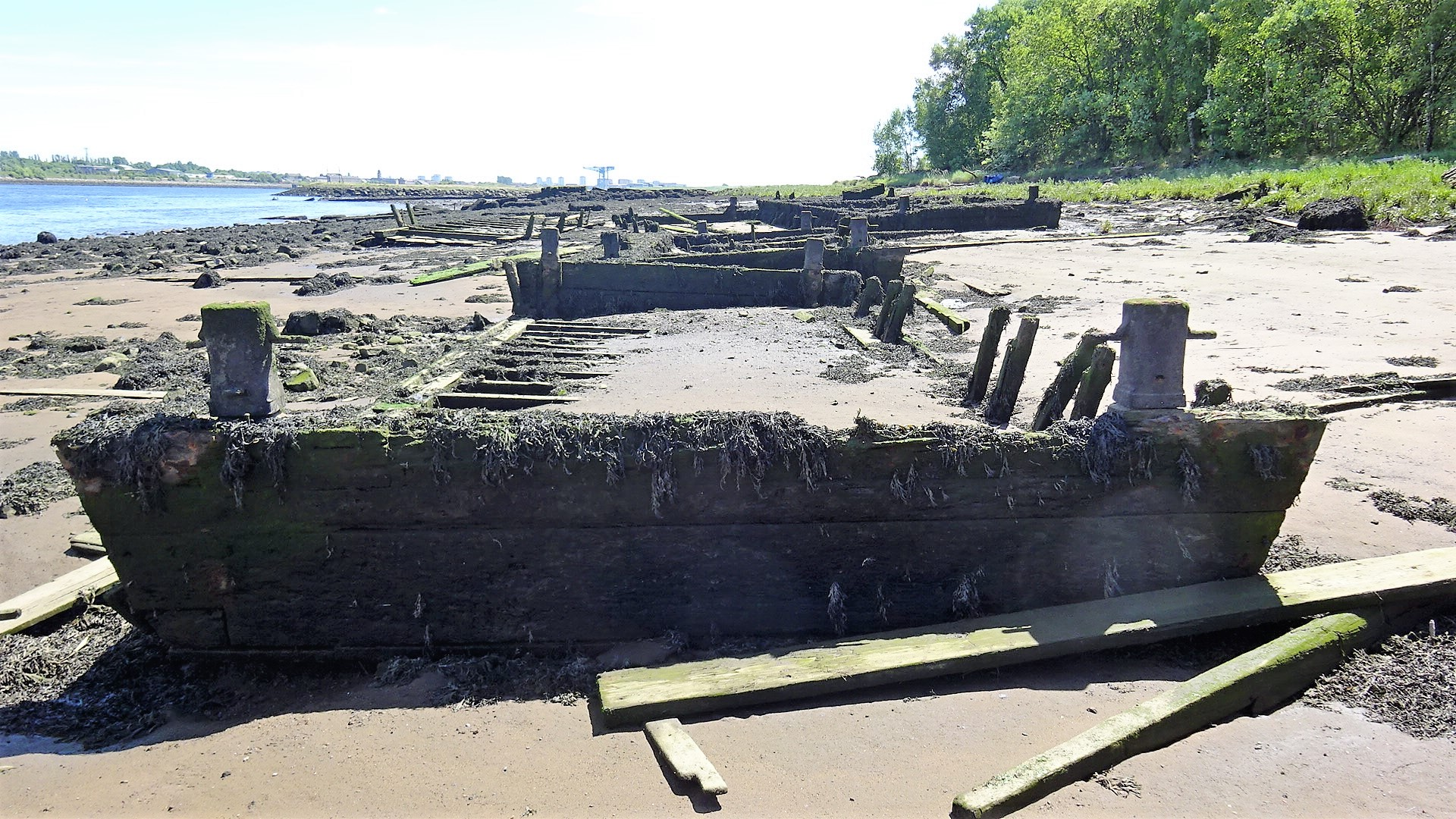
The mud punt ship graveyard.

Both the quay and associated slipway were once served by the aforementioned roads that ran to the slipway basin or dock and along the quay. The basin is 54 m (177 ft) long and 10 m (33 ft) wide, with a jetty built with small stones composing the eastern side and a ruinous wall formed of well dressed larger stone blocks forming its western side. Park Quay jetty is 70 m (230 ft) long and 16 m (52 ft) wide. The eastern jetty is ruinous towards its terminus and the eastern side facing the dock appears to have partially collapsed at some point. A basic repair appears to have been made with a row of wooden piles used to keep the loose stone in place. A slipway at its southern end once enabled access to the river basin at low tide levels.

The OS map of Renfrewshire in 1864 shows a wide jetty with a flagstaff and a small building on the western side. It appears to have extended into the river as far as the low water mark, but the shoreline has altered considerably over the years due to dredging, building of training dikes, jetties, etc. Between 1864 and 1895 a dock or basin was built also extending into the Clyde towards the low water mark. The jetty is portrayed as if it was damaged by erosion, floods, etc and a repair effected using wooden piles that are still visible. The eastern jetty in 1857 had a possible crane and a partly curved and strengthened end. In the 1920s or 30s the jetty terminus appears to have been altered and given a straight sided profile. In 1905 the quay seems to still have been in use given that it's marked as such and a beacon stood near by on the upstream direction, possibly on the circular stone structure that once stood in that location. In 1939 the quay was not marked as disused, unlike the abandoned Rashielee Quay, and the repaired eastern dock wall is shown as a linear structure and the terminus of the jetty is linear. Rashielee Quarry and its quay stood near by and provided much of the whinstone used in the construction of quays, jetties, training walls, etc on this part of the Clyde.

Location of Park Quay, Renfrewshire

From the evidence of the 1895 OS map a circular pile of stones was located at the low tide level a short distance up river and as stated this may be the one erected in 1869, carrying the beacon shown as a navigation aid in the 1905 OS map. This structure is now just an irregular pile of stones.

=== The Park Quay Ship Graveyard ===
Lying on the River Clyde shoreline bordered by the Newshot Local Nature Reserve and downriver from the better known Newshot ship graveyard are a number of abandoned mud punts in varying states of preservation. Some remain in a linear arrangement, reflecting the position they were grounded in when towed to their final resting place after mud punts became redundant due to improved dredging techniques.

== See also ==
- Bodinbo Island
- Donald's Quay
- Milton Island
- Newshot Island
- St Patrick's Rock
