= St Patrick's Rock =

Rock and naigation device

Coordinates: 55°55′13″N 4°27′51″W

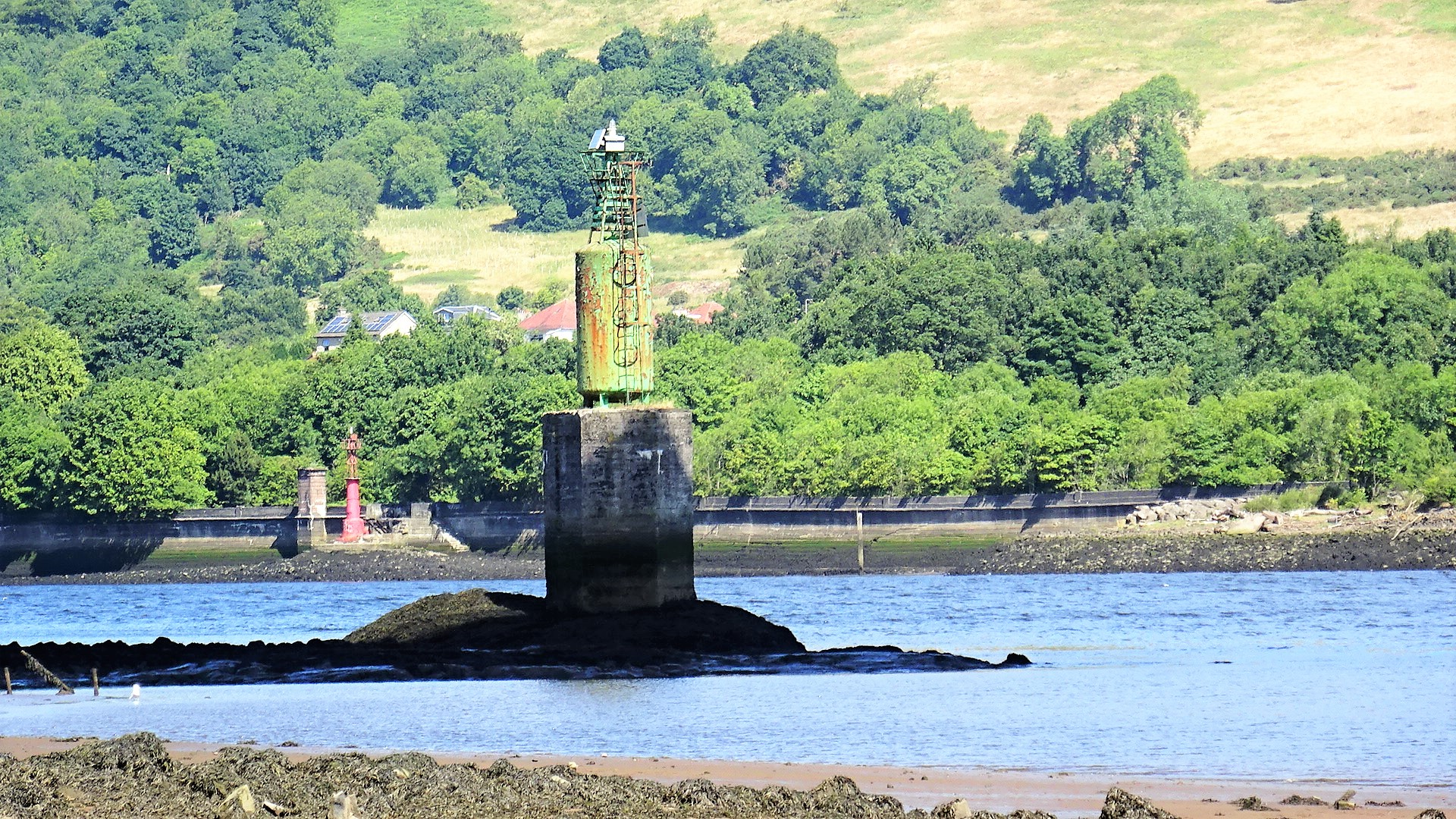
St Patrick's Rock and light.

St Patrick's Rock or St Patrick's Stone is located in the River Clyde (NS461724) close to the Erskine Bridge and the old Erskine Ferry on the Renfrewshire side of the river. It is reputedly the location from which the 16 year old Saint Patrick was kidnapped by Irish pirates whilst he was fishing. The rock is covered at high tide and it is also the location of a navigation light known as St Patrick's Light.

== History ==
Saint Patrick was born in Roman Britain in a place as yet unidentified with certainty. His father, Calpurnius, was a decurion. At the age of 16, Saint Patrick was kidnapped by Irish pirates whilst he was fishing and taken to Ireland where he remained as a captive for six years. He eventually returned to Ireland where he had a major role in converting the Irish to Christianity.

The legend is said to have arisen or was first recorded in the 19th century. The Old Kilpatrick area began to be associated with Saint Patrick in the 10th century.

His home was at a place known as 'Bannavem Taberniae' which the etymologists John Irving identifies with the local place name of Bonnaughton.

== Description ==
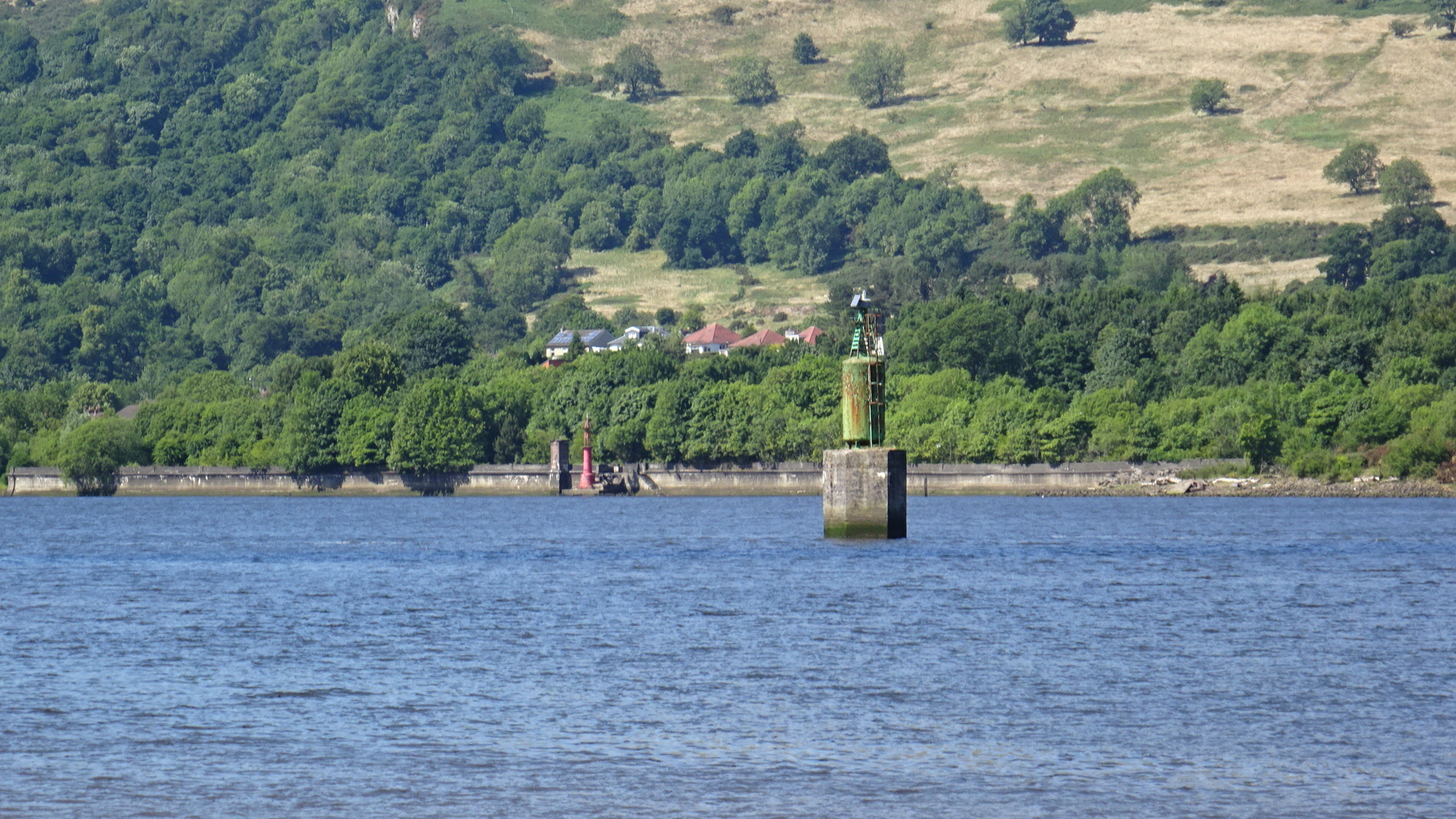
St Patrick's Light at high tide with St Patrick's Rock submerged.

This small rock is exposed towards low tide and is partly covered by the navigation aid known as St Patrick's Light. Running down to the rock from the Renfrewshire shore is the remnants of the old North Jetty. It at present lies on the edge of the deeper waters of the River Clyde at this point that remain inundated even at low tide.

=== St Patrick's Light ===
St Patrick’s Light (NS 46109 72428) is of 20th century, post WWII origin and stands atop a large cast iron gas cylinder which once fuelled the light until solar panels were added as an alternative power source.

=== The North Jetty ===
This ruinous jetty is around 60m in length and ends at St Patrick's Rock. It was constructed with a rubble core and once entirely surfaced by facing blocks. A narrow culvert once ran along the median line. The jetty once extended a further 20m and also had another navigation beacon at its terminus. The second beacon and jetty extension no longer exist. The jetty was one of a pair with the remnants of the other lying on the northern side of the Erskine Bridge.

Location of St Patrick's Rock, Renfrewshire

== Micro-history ==
Saint Patrick's church at Old Kilpatrick is said to have been built on a bed of Irish soil and the near by St Patrick's Well or the Trees Well provided water to the people of the town for many years, however it is now covered over.

== See also ==
- Bodinbo Island
- Milton Island
- Park Quay
- Rashielee Quay
