= Strathgryffe =

Valley in Scotland

Coordinates: 55.878°N 4.574°W

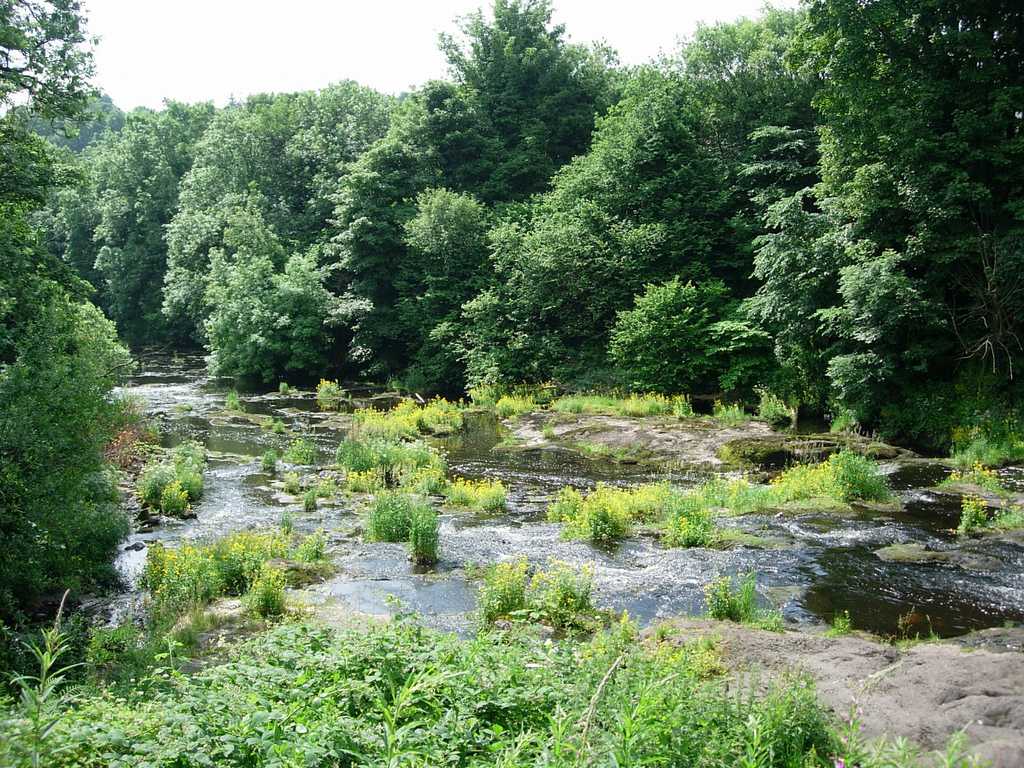
The River Gryffe in Renfrewshire

Strathgryffe or Gryffe Valley (Note: Also spelled Strathgryfe, Gryfe Valley.) (Scottish Gaelic: Srath Ghriobhaidh) is the strath of River Gryffe, which lies within the historic county of Renfrewshire in the west central Lowlands of Scotland.

Strathgryffe also gives its name to a feudal lordship, which covered the western portion of Renfrewshire in the 12th century and formed the nucleus of the county. The land was originally associated with the House of Stewart, who went on to be monarchs of Scotland and later Great Britain.

The settlements of Strathgryffe are divided between the council areas of Inverclyde and Renfrewshire and largely follow the flow of the River Gryffe, from Kilmacolm in the far west to where the river meets the Black Cart Water between Houston and Inchinnan. Other significant settlements include Bridge of Weir, Quarriers Village and Crosslee.

== Name ==
A Strath is a wide glen. The term is rendered in Scots Gaelic as 'Srath' and in Modern Welsh as 'Ystrad'.

'Stragrif' is mentioned in the 1169 charter of Paisley Abbey, which placed the churches of the area under the control of the new abbey. Later, the name 'Gryff' is recorded in the Military Survey of Scotland 1747–1755, compiled by William Roy, a predecessor to the Ordnance Survey maps of Great Britain.

The 'Gryffe' spelling has gained predominance in the area, seen for example in signposts showing the name of the river and the names of organisations such as the Gryffe Valley Rotary Club and Gryffe High School.

== History ==
The lands of Strathgryffe were granted by King David I to Walter fitz Alan, first High Steward of Scotland, and founder of the Stewart family in Scotland, probably in the 1150s. The Royal house would continue to hold lands in Renfrewshire, with the heir to the British throne holding the title of Baron Renfrew, and in part forming the principality of Scotland.

In the early 15th century, the area emerged as a county by the name Renfrewshire, owing to the Stewart's base at Renfrew Castle. Initially the chief magistrate in a county was its sheriff - and later in the 15th century the position of Sheriff of Renfrew was held by the Sempill family - an arrangement that continued until the 17th century.

== Geography ==
The geography of the area is a contrasting mix of green fields surrounding the river, with rough moorland in the higher areas, particularly Clyde Muirshiel Regional Park.

=== Settlements ===
There are a number of villages in Strathgryffe, varying considerably in size. The following straddle or are immediately adjacent to the River Gryffe:

- Kilmacolm
- Quarrier's Village (Kilmacolm civil parish)
- Bridge of Weir
- Houston (including Craigends on the South-east bank of the river)
- Crosslee (Houston and Killellan civil parish)
