= Hugh de Paduinan =

Scottish knight templar

Sir Hugh de Paduinan (1140–1189) was a Scoto-Norman baron, Knight Templar and progenitor of the Clan Houston. Sir Hugh was granted lands in the historic county of Renfrewshire and gave his name to the village of Houston, deriving from 'Hugh's town'. (Note: Both Sir Hugh's given name and surname are subject to a number of different spellings: Hugh or Hugo and Paduinan, Padinan and Padvinan. Sir Hugh is occasionally confused with Hugues de Payens (otherwise spelled Payan, Peanz, Payns or Pedano), a similarly named Knight Templar associated with the churches of Scotland.)

== Biography ==
Sir Hugh was born in 1140 of Anglo-Norman ancestry. He is believed to have married a Scottish lord's daughter, and his heir was his son Reginald. He was a follower of Sir Walter Fitzalan.

During the reign of Malcolm IV of Scotland Sir Hugh was granted the lands of Kilpeter, around the modern parish of Houston and Killellan in the west-central Lowlands of Scotland county of Renfrewshire, by Baldwin of Biggar, the Sheriff of Lanark. Baldwin may have been Sir Hugh's father in law. He established the Templar Chapel on the site of Chapel Farm just outside the village of Houston. His descendants remained the Lairds of Houston until 1740, where the lands were sold to Alexander Speirs of Elderslie, a Glasgow tobacco lord. The main village in the area now bears the name Houston.

Both Sir Hugh and his descendants often arise as signatories of deeds, particularly pertaining to Scottish churches. Sir Hugh died in 1189 in the Holy Land, possibly amongst the Templars who were killed at the Battle of Hattin.
