= Bridge of Weir =

Coordinates: 55.856511°N 4.577666°W

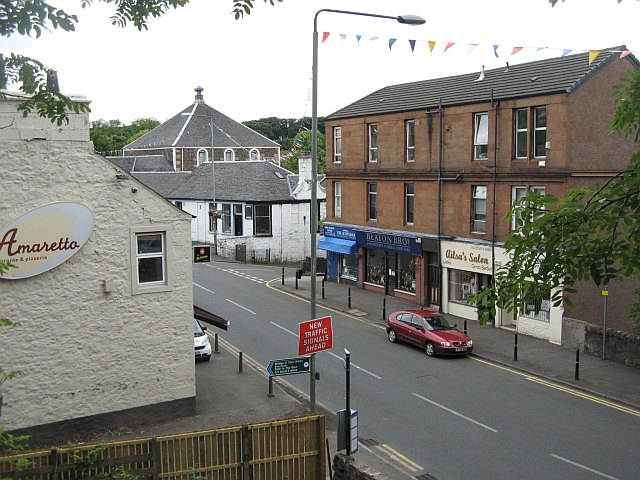
- Part of Bridge of Weir's Main Street

- Location within Renfrewshire
- Population: 4,920 (2020)
- OS grid reference: NS387655
- Council area: Renfrewshire
- Lieutenancy area: Renfrewshire
- Country: Scotland
- Sovereign state: United Kingdom
- Post town: BRIDGE OF WEIR
- Postcode district: PA11
- Dialling code: 01505
- Police: Scotland
- Fire: Scottish
- Ambulance: Scottish
- UK Parliament: Paisley and Renfrewshire North
- Scottish Parliament: Renfrewshire North and West

Bridge of Weir is a village within the Renfrewshire council area and wider historic county of Renfrewshire in the west central Lowlands of Scotland.

Lying within the Gryffe Valley, Bridge of Weir owes its name to the historic crossing point that it provided over the River Gryffe. The village was initially formed around industries such as cotton and leather, reliant on the power of the river. These industries brought about its expansion in the 18th century in land attached to the 15th century Ranfurly Castle situated between the two established parishes of Kilbarchan and Houston and Killellan. A rail connection, as part of the Glasgow and South Western Railway, in the 1860s, significantly supported the village's development.

Today Bridge of Weir serves largely as a dormitory settlement for nearby Glasgow and Paisley, maintaining a commercial centre of its own and some light industry and agriculture. It remains well known for its leather production, which has continued since the first industry emerged.

== History ==
=== Toponymy ===
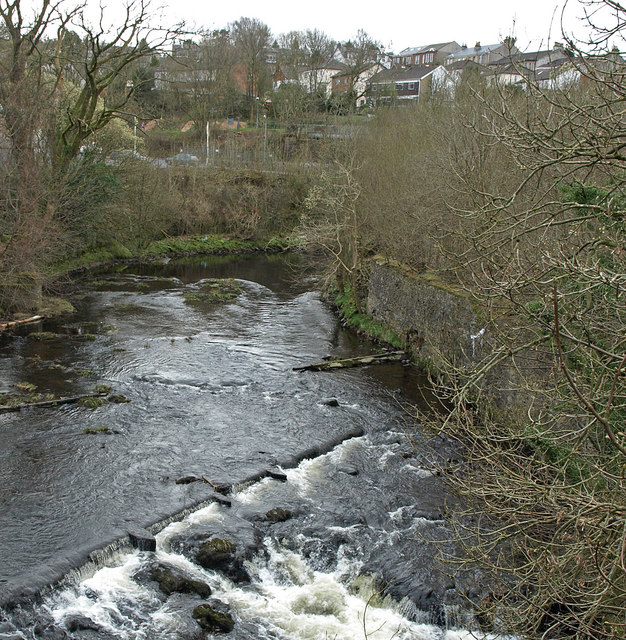
River Gryffe at Bridge of Weir, with former mill infrastructure visible.

The name of Bridge of Weir (Scots: Brig o Weir) is first recorded in the early 18th century before a significant settlement was constructed in the area. The 'weir' is a reference to a salmon weir which used to be located on the Gryffe. An older name provided for the village is "Port o'Weir", implying a river crossing; this name remained in some use even after the current name had been adopted.

=== Early history ===
Bridge of Weir was historically a rural area divided between the parishes of neighbouring Houston and Killellan and Kilbarchan on either side of the River Gryffe. Growing out of the lands of the 15th century Ranfurly Castle, the village emerged later than its neighbours among a number of small farms that occupied the area.

The earliest economy of the village was centred on the Renfrewshire cotton industry. From the late 18th century, the River Gryffe was exploited to power cotton mills. The bridge at Bridge of Weir was constructed at Burngill around 1770 and was considerably upgraded and widened in 1892 to allow for two-way traffic. It was finally demolished in 1964, with a more modern structure created. The bridge owes its construction to being on the route between the significant towns of Greenock and Paisley, with a Great Road constructed between the two in 1794.

Leather also emerged as a local product, with the village supporting three tanneries. The leather industry survives to this day, now on a single site, in the form of a highly successful, modern facility with five Queen's Awards for International Business.

=== Later expansion ===
The Glasgow, Paisley and Johnstone Canal provided an initial link for Renfrewshire industry to its wider urban centres. The former canal provided a route for the later expansion of the railway to nearby settlements. From 1864, the Bridge of Weir Railway provided a rail link to Johnstone through the Bridge of Weir railway station in the village. From 1869, the line was incorporated into the wider Greenock and Ayrshire Railway, extending to Kilmacolm and beyond to Greenock. This railway substantially altered the character of the village and contributed to its forthcoming affluence. The railway closed on 10 January 1983 and now forms part of the Clyde to Forth cycle route (National Cycle Route 75).

== Economy ==
Bridge of Weir is surrounded by agricultural lands, with traditional industries being cotton milling and leather tanning. The earliest cotton mills were built in the late 18th and early 19th centuries on the banks on the River Gryffe. Today, the town's golf courses and fishing attract visitors and there the village has a commercial centre with retail stores, restaurants and public houses.

=== Leather ===
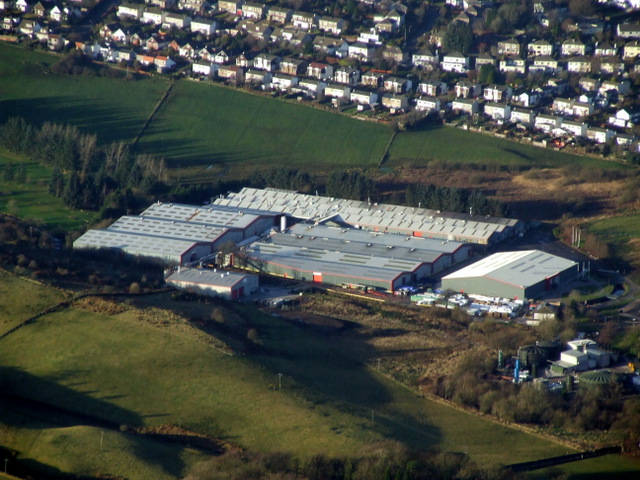
Locher Works from the air.

From the 18th century, the waulking mill was used in the production of leather with the Burngill Mill having been recorded in 1770. It was purchased by Andrew Muirhead in 1870 whose family had been in the leather industry in Glasgow for several generations. In 1905, Arthur Muirhead set up a further leather mill at the Laigh Mill (renamed the Clydesdale Works) and founded the Bridge of Weir Leather Company. Despite having several premises in the past, since the beginning of the 21st century, the company's business has been consolidated at the Locher and Baltic Works.

The leather works continue to serve as a large employer in the area and trade their goods across the world. Some notable customers include:

- In 1989, the benches of the British Parliament's House of Commons and House of Lords chambers in Westminster were reupholstered using Bridge of Weir leather.
- Bridge of Weir leather has upholstered many famous ocean liners, including Cunard's Queens Mary, Elizabeth, Elizabeth 2 and Victoria. Azimut Yachts and Sunseeker are also customers of Bridge of Weir Tannery.
- The Old Bailey, and many other notable public buildings around the world feature their leather.
- Several major airlines, including British Airways (including the Concorde), Virgin, Cathay Pacific, KLM, Malaysia Airlines, Singapore Airlines, and Qantas
- Automobile customers of Bridge of Weir leather include Aston Martin, Bentley, DeLorean, Jaguar, Land Rover, Lincoln, McLaren, Mercedes-Benz, Rolls-Royce, Saab, Polestar, and Volvo. Also, some of Ford's Model T (that were UK built) were upholstered with Bridge of Weir leather.

== Governance ==
Bridge of Weir is part of the council area of Renfrewshire, as well the historic county of Renfrewshire which has wider boundaries and retains some official functions, for example as a registration county and lieutenancy area.

For elections to Renfrewshire Council, Bridge of Weir is part of ward 11, named 'Bishopton, Bridge of Weir and Langbank', which elects three of Renfrewshire's forty two councillors. The ward results in the most recent election are:

Bishopton, Bridge of Weir and Langbank Ward - (2017 Renfrewshire Council election)
Party	Candidate	FPv%	Count			
Party	Candidate	FPv%	1	2	3	4
Conservative	James MacLaren (incumbent)	45.47	2,552			
SNP	Natalie Don	31.77	1,783			
Labour	Colin McCulloch	15.96	896	1,212.69	1,289	1,407.35
Liberal Democrats	Elliot Harrison	3.78	212	537.68	578.49	733.70
Green	Ellen Höfer-Franz	3.03	170	230.72	406.93	
Electorate: TBC Valid: 5,613 Spoilt: 44 Quota: 1,404 Turnout: 5,657 (55.1%)

Bridge of Weir also has one of Renfrewshire's twenty-seven community councils representing the village.

== Culture and community ==
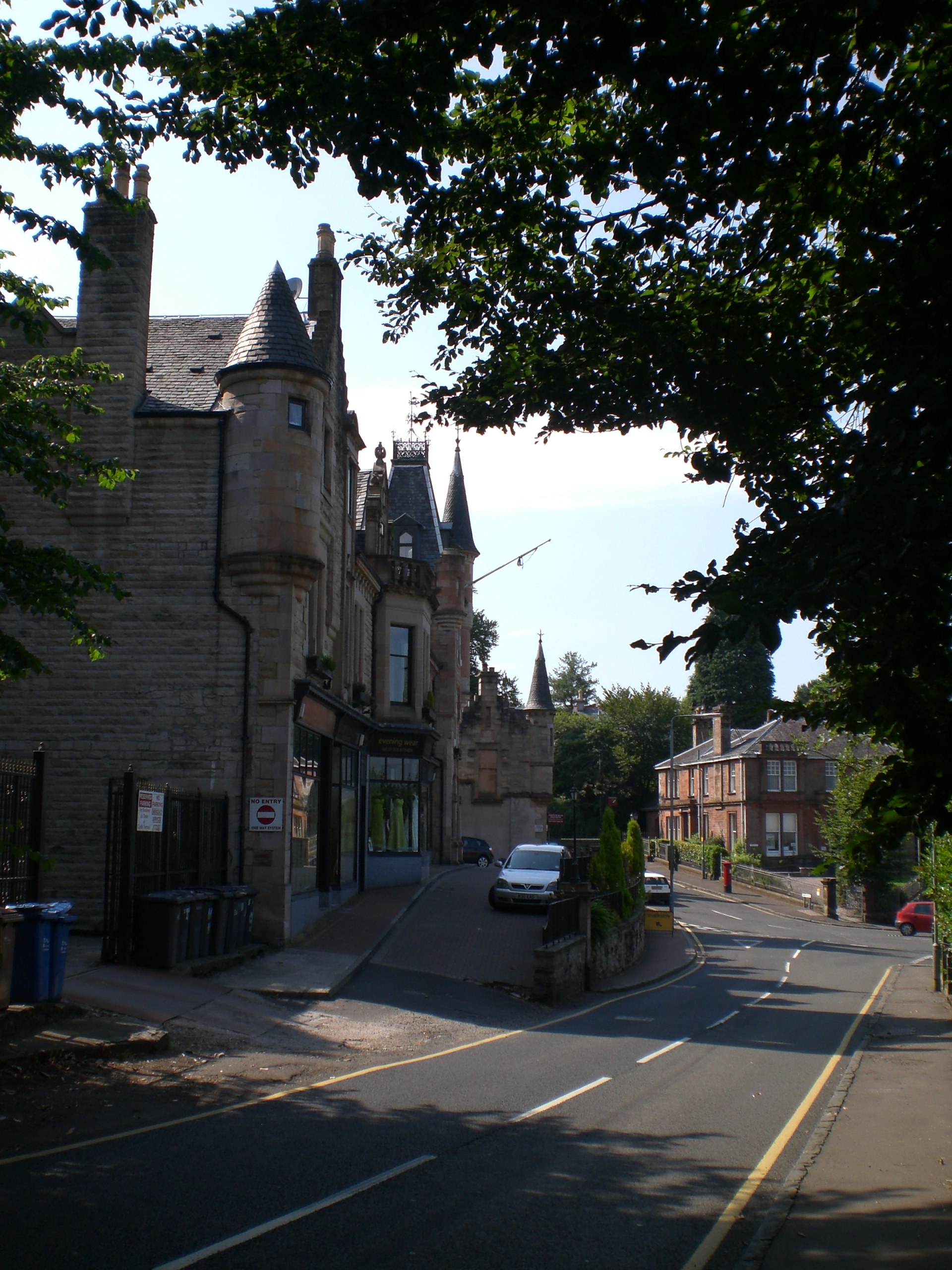
The former Ranfurly Hotel (left) and the Clydesdale Bank building from Ranfurly-St Machar's Churchyard

=== Recreation ===
Bisected by the River Gryffe, angling is available within the village. The river hosts brown trout, grayling and occasionally Atlantic salmon. Numerous outdoor pursuits are available at the nearby Clyde Muirshiel Regional Park. National Cycle Route 75 runs through the village.

The village is also known for its golf history. At one point there were five golf courses in the vicinity; today there are two remaining: the Old Course Ranfurly and the Ranfurly Castle golf clubs. There was a thriving ice hockey team from around 1895 and in 1935 were Scottish National League Champions.

=== Notable people ===
- Margaret Sangster and Florence Sangster were born here in the 1890s and both had a leading effect on advertising.
- Leslie Green, jurisprudential theorist, was born here.
- William Quarrier Kennedy, geologist, was born here in 1903
- John Lyle, educated here, in 1843 emigrated to Wisconsin, where he became a farmer and politician, serving in the Wisconsin State Assembly and as "Chairman" (analogous to mayor) of his township
- Sheila Reid, actress, was born in the town in 1937, but spent much of her youth in England.
- Patrick Gallacher, was born in the town in 1909. With Sunderland AFC, he won the English First Division League Championship in 1936 and the FA Cup in 1937. He made one appearance for Scotland in 1934.

== See also ==
- Ranfurly
