= Houston, Renfrewshire =

Coordinates: 55.86697°N 4.55207°W

Houston: Scottish Gaelic: Cille Pheadair; Scots: Houstoun
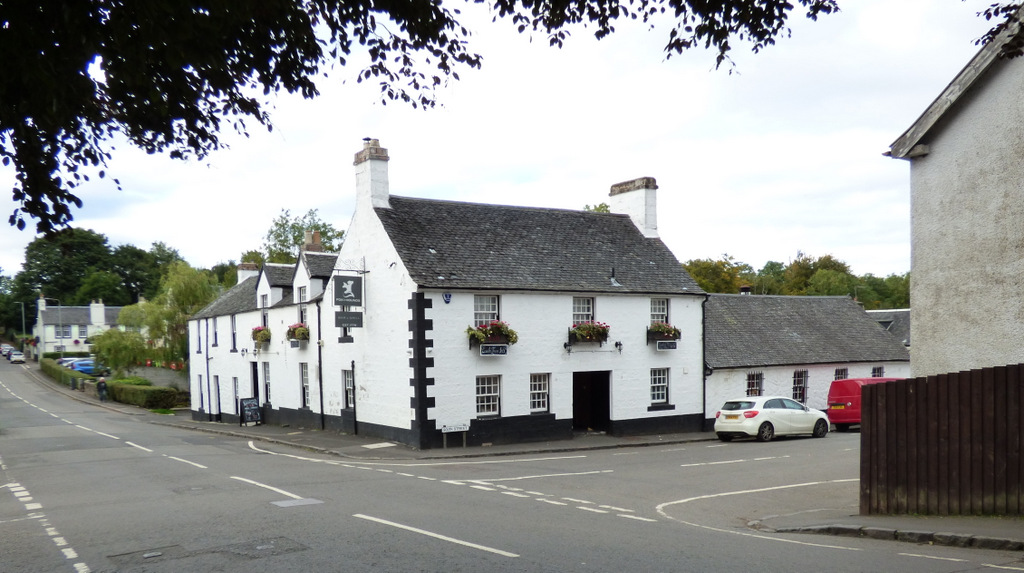
- Main Street in Houston

- Location within Renfrewshire
- Population: 6,360 (2020)
- OS grid reference: NS404667
- Civil parish: Houston and Killellan
- Council area: Renfrewshire
- Lieutenancy area: Renfrewshire
- Country: Scotland
- Sovereign state: United Kingdom
- Post town: JOHNSTONE
- Postcode district: PA6
- Dialling code: 01505
- Police: Scotland
- Fire: Scottish
- Ambulance: Scottish
- UK Parliament: Paisley and Renfrewshire North
- Scottish Parliament: Renfrewshire North and West Renfrewshire South West Scotland

Houston (/ˈhustən/ HOO-stən; Scots: Houstoun; Scottish Gaelic: Cille Pheadair) is a village in the council area of Renfrewshire and the larger historic county of the same name in the west central Lowlands of Scotland.

Houston lies within the Gryffe Valley on the banks of the River Gryffe 6 miles (10 km) north-west of Paisley and is the largest settlement in the civil parish of Houston and Killellan, which covers the neighbouring village of Crosslee and a number of smaller settlements in the villages' rural hinterland.

The village grew around a 16th-century castle and parish church dedicated to Saint Peter, which gave the area its former name of Kilpeter (Cille Pheadair in Scottish Gaelic). The present-day old village dates mainly back to the 18th century and was a planned community, replacing earlier buildings. Historically, the economy was based around agriculture and, in common with a number of other Renfrewshire villages, cotton weaving. The old village was designated as a conservation area in 1968.

From the middle of the 20th century, a larger area of residential settlement expanded the village into nearby areas such as the more upmarket Craigends, removing the open country between Houston and Crosslee. These additions to the village have expanded its population considerably, changing its character chiefly to a dormitory settlement for nearby Glasgow and Paisley with a largely service-based economy.

== History ==
=== Toponymy ===
Houston House.

Houston was originally known as Kilpeter. In the mid-12th century, the fee of Kilpeter was granted by Baldwin of Biggar, Sheriff of Lanark, to Hugh of Pettinain. From Hugh, the lands eventually became known as Houston (meaning "Hugh's town or manor").

In a bull of Pope Honorius in 1225–27, the churches of Kilmacolm and Houston are mentioned as "ecclesiae de Kilmacolme et de Villa Hugonis". In a later bull of Pope Clement IV in 1265, the churches belonging to Paisley Abbey are listed including the church of "Howston".

=== Early history ===
Houston had long been a site of human settlement. In the 1970s, a Bronze Age burial site was found at South Mound on the western edge of the village. To the north-east lies Barochan Hill, the site of a Roman fort. A later Antonine era fort was found on a farm near Bishopton, less than 2 miles away.

The first village in Houston was constructed around the parish Church of St Peter and Houston Castle, now respectively the parish church and Houston House – largely 19th century buildings. Houston House and the castle which is partially incorporated within its structure date back to the time of Hugh of Pettinain and remained in the possession of his family who later became the Houstons of Houston. The Castle stayed in the ownership of the family until 1740 when it was purchased by Glasgow tobacco lord Alexander Speirs of Elderslie. Following ownership by five generations of the Speirs family, Houston House passed to Major David Crichton Maitland in 1959 and then to his son Mark Crichton Maitland in 1995 before being divided into a number of flats.

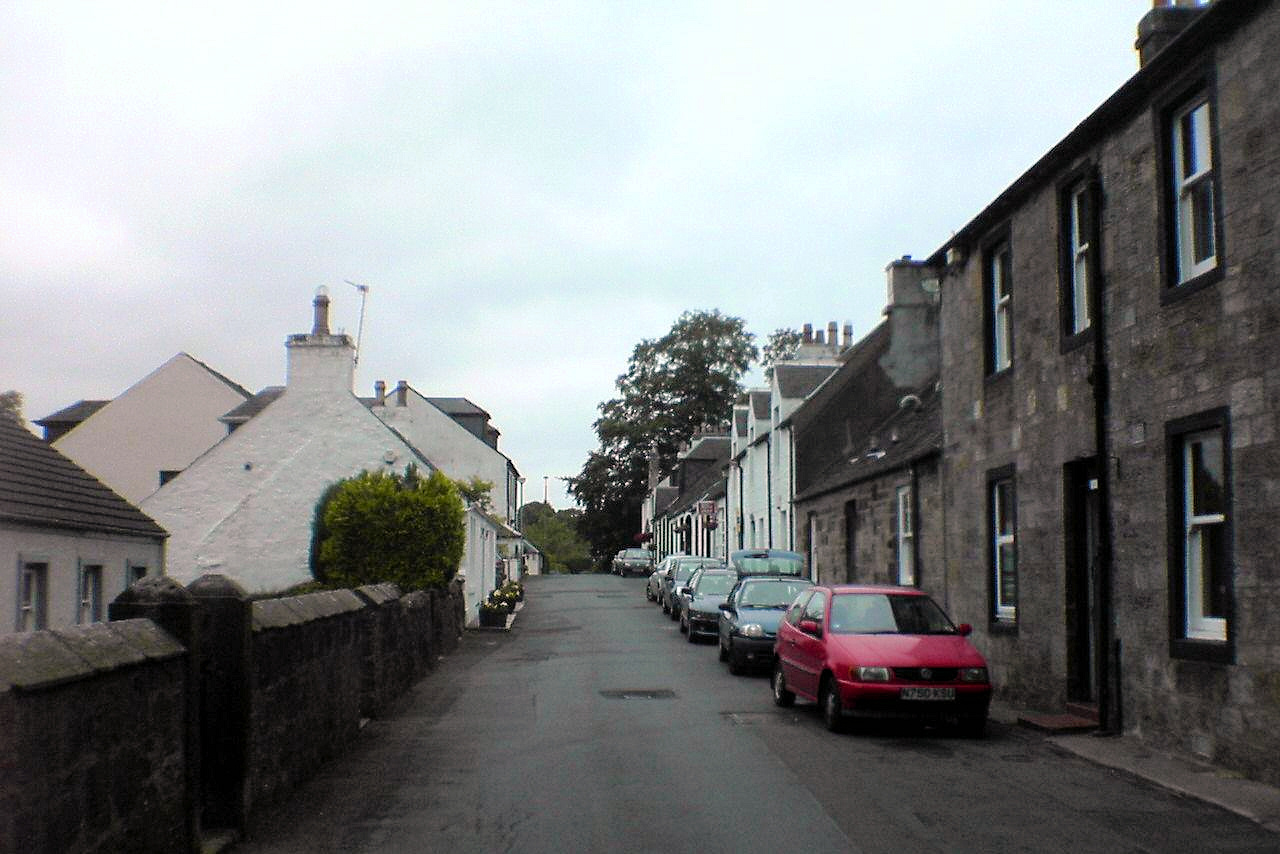
North Street, in the old village

James McGuire MacRae was presented with the estate by his father's friend, James MacRae. It passed to his son, who demolished the castle and built the weavers cottages with the stones. With this 18th-century change in ownership of the land therefore, the 'old village' was cleared from around the castle by the laird. The new village of some thirty five cottages constructed to the west in 1781 from the stone of the Castle, which was later to evolve into a country house. This new village – which forms the basis of the modern village – was a planned community built along two main streets: North Street and South Street and is an example of the 18th century Planned Village Movement. The layout, straddling the Houston Burn, provided washing facilities accessible to local people as well as supporting the small-scale weaving industry. This 'new village' is designated by the Renfrewshire authorities as a conservation village.

A notable remnant of this move is the village's mercat cross, which incorporates parts dating back to the 14th century. Due to the move from an original position on Kirk Road, and the fact that it incorporates a large sundial, it has been placed at an unusual angle at the centre of the 'new' village. The mercat cross has become used as a symbol for the village.

=== Modern history ===
Both railway stations (on separate lines) built within the parish in the 19th century, Houston and Crosslee Station and Georgetown station (both now closed), bypassed the village itself. As a consequence, Houston did not experience the railway boom of nearby villages like Bridge of Weir and Kilmacolm, expanding slowly until the later half of the 20th century when it became a popular commuter settlement.

The main industry of Houston between the 17th and 19th century was weaving. The River Gryffe later provided a cotton spinning industry with the creation of the Crosslee cotton mill with other small manufacturing concerns, such as embroidery, later opening in the village.

In July 2007, Houston was featured prominently in news reports around the United Kingdom after it was discovered that inhabitants of a house in the village were linked to the 2007 Glasgow International Airport attack of 30 June. The Houston Community Council observed that "it is a sobering thought that such a situation could happen on our very doorstep and that even in a quiet, rural setting such as ours there can be people intent on disrupting the natural balance of things by violent means."

== Governance ==
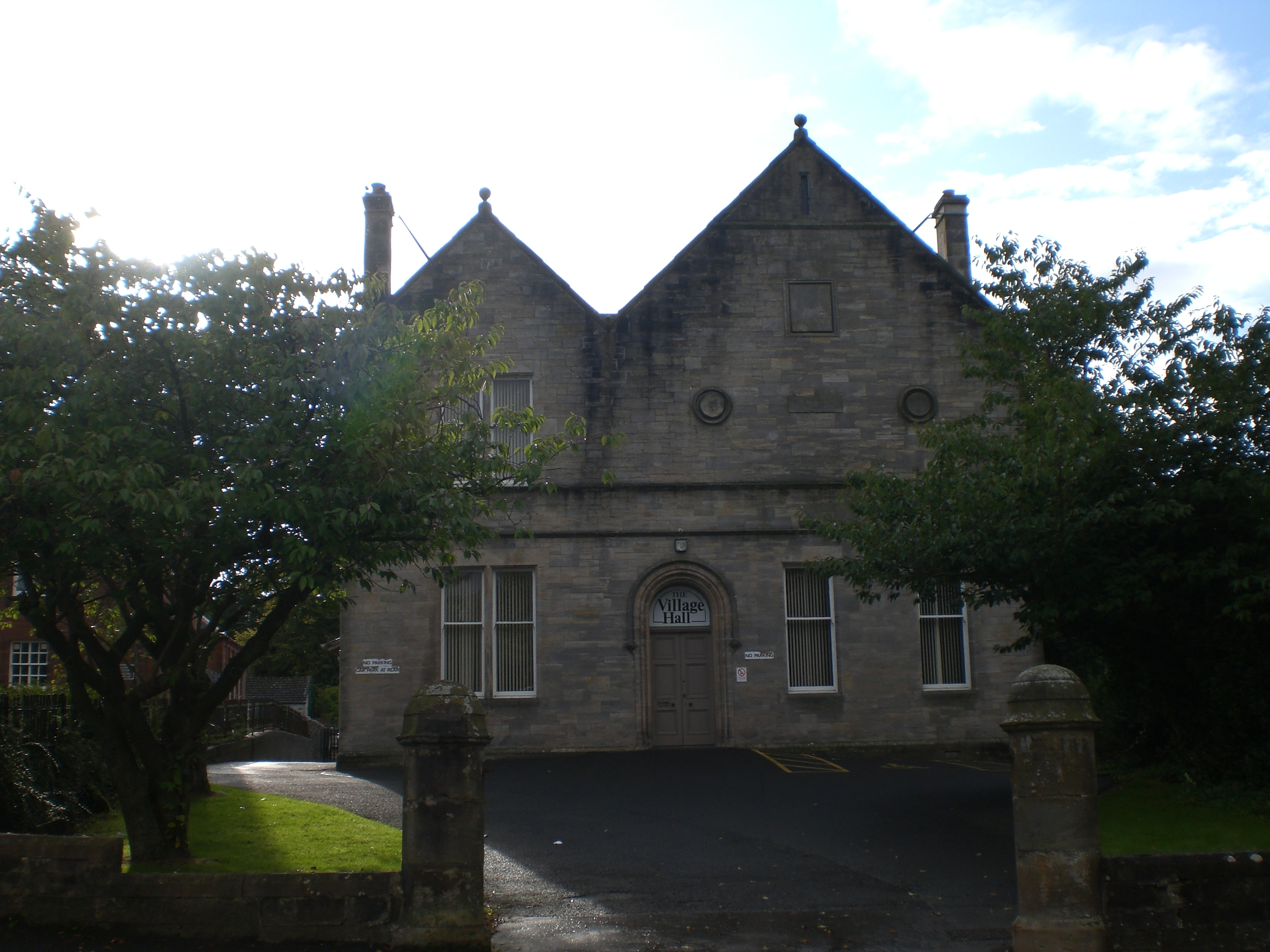
Houston's Village Hall

=== Local government ===
Houston and its parish form part of the Renfrewshire council area. For the 2007 local authority elections in Scotland, Houston was entered into a new four-councillor ward, Ward 9, alongside Crosslee and the town of Linwood (Ward 9).

The boundaries of the civil parish of Houston and Kilellan follow the creation of a united ecclesiastical parish centred on Houston in the 18th century. The parish spreads over a wide rural hinterland including a number of nearby settlements, the most significant being Crosslee, Craigends and Barochan.

With the decline of significance of the civil parish in local government, this area has largely become part of the Houston Community Council area . The community council is chiefly a consultative body, forming a focus for local views, and has no statutory powers of its own.

=== Central government ===
Houston forms part of the Paisley and Renfrewshire North constituency for elections to the House of Commons in the Parliament of the United Kingdom. The current Member of Parliament (MP) for this area is Gavin Newlands. The constituency was created in 2005 following boundary changes with Houston previously forming part of the West Renfrewshire constituency.

For devolved matters, Houston is part of the Scottish Parliament constituency of Renfrewshire North and West, which straddles the boundary between the council areas of Inverclyde and Renfrewshire. Since 2011, the constituency Member of the Scottish Parliament for the area is Natalie Don MSP. The Renfrewshire North and West constituency forms part of the West of Scotland Scottish Parliament electoral region. Seven further MSPs are elected for this region through the Scottish Parliament's Additional Member electoral system.

== Landmarks ==
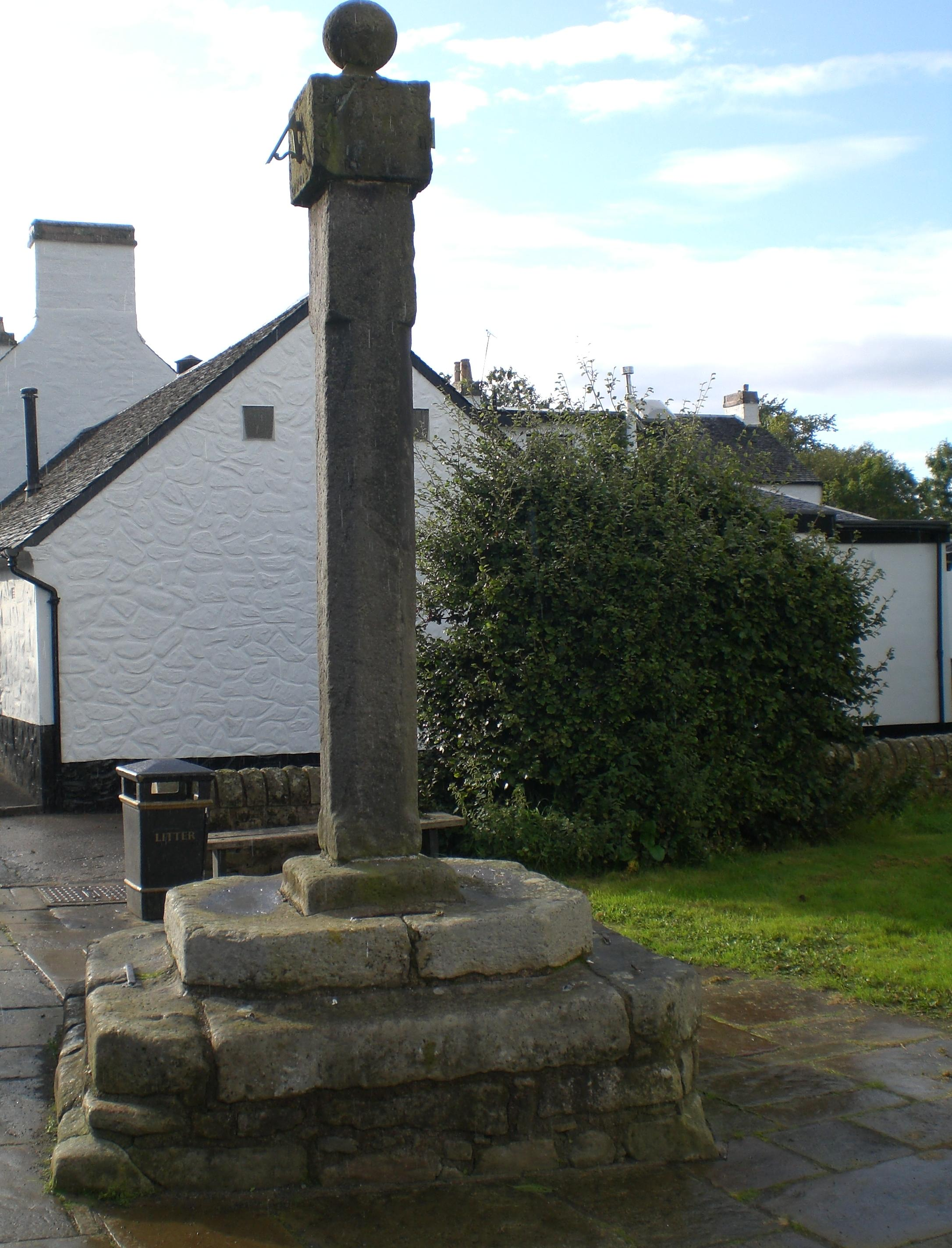
Houston's mercat cross, used as a symbol of the village.

Houston's historic village centre, located at the north-west edge of the village, is a designated conservation area. The area is home to the main village pubs, small shops and the village's Post Office. North Street and South Street are dominated by traditional white cottages, some dating to the 17th century. The old village was a planned community of houses largely built around the Houston Burn, which gave communal access to washing facilities.

Some remains of the 16th century Houston Castle still exist largely in the grounds of the current Houston House. The area sits beside Houston and Killellan Kirk, the established (Church of Scotland) parish church. It is possible that Lord Darnley, husband of Mary, Queen of Scots resided at the castle for some years.

The Barochan Cross, an 11 ft (3.4 metre) tall Celtic Christian cross possibly dating to the 8th century, formerly lay just south of the Mill of Barochan in the parish. In the 19th century, it was moved to a knoll opposite Corsliehill closer to the village before finally being moved in the 20th century to Paisley Abbey where it now remains in order to protect it from further weathering.

The Craigends Yew is an ancient yew tree in the parish, supposed to be the oldest living thing in Renfrewshire, with a potential age of around a thousand years. There are two ancient wells in Houston, once considered to have healing powers. St Fillan's Well sits in the fields beside Kilallan Kirk and St Peter's Well that also gives its name to a locally brewed ale.

The parish church, which is a congregation of the Church of Scotland, lies to the east of the old village. A 19th century Roman Catholic church, St Fillan's, is to the south of Main Street.

== Religion ==
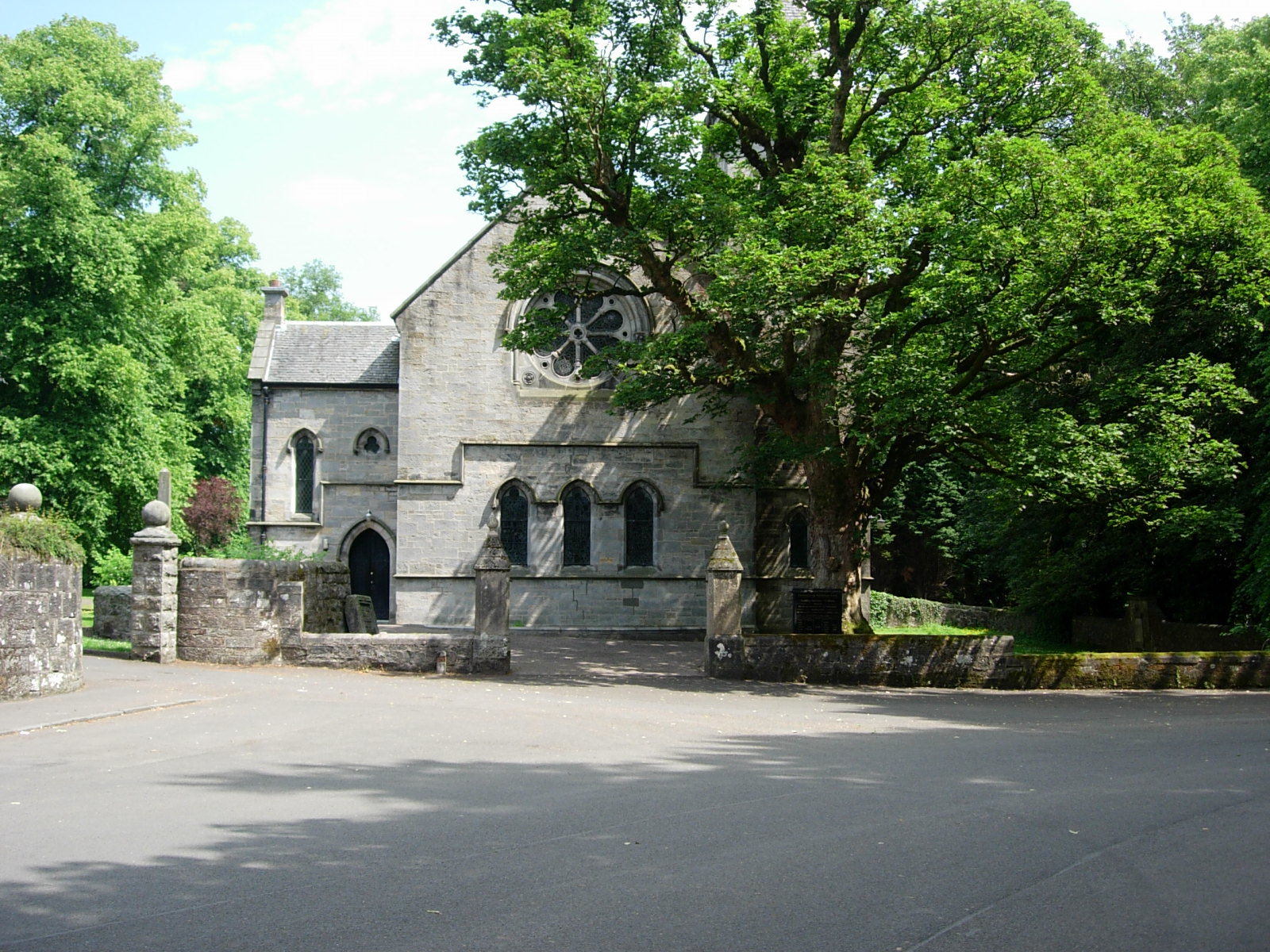
Houston & Killellan Kirk (parish church), in the grounds of Houston House. The steeple is obscured.

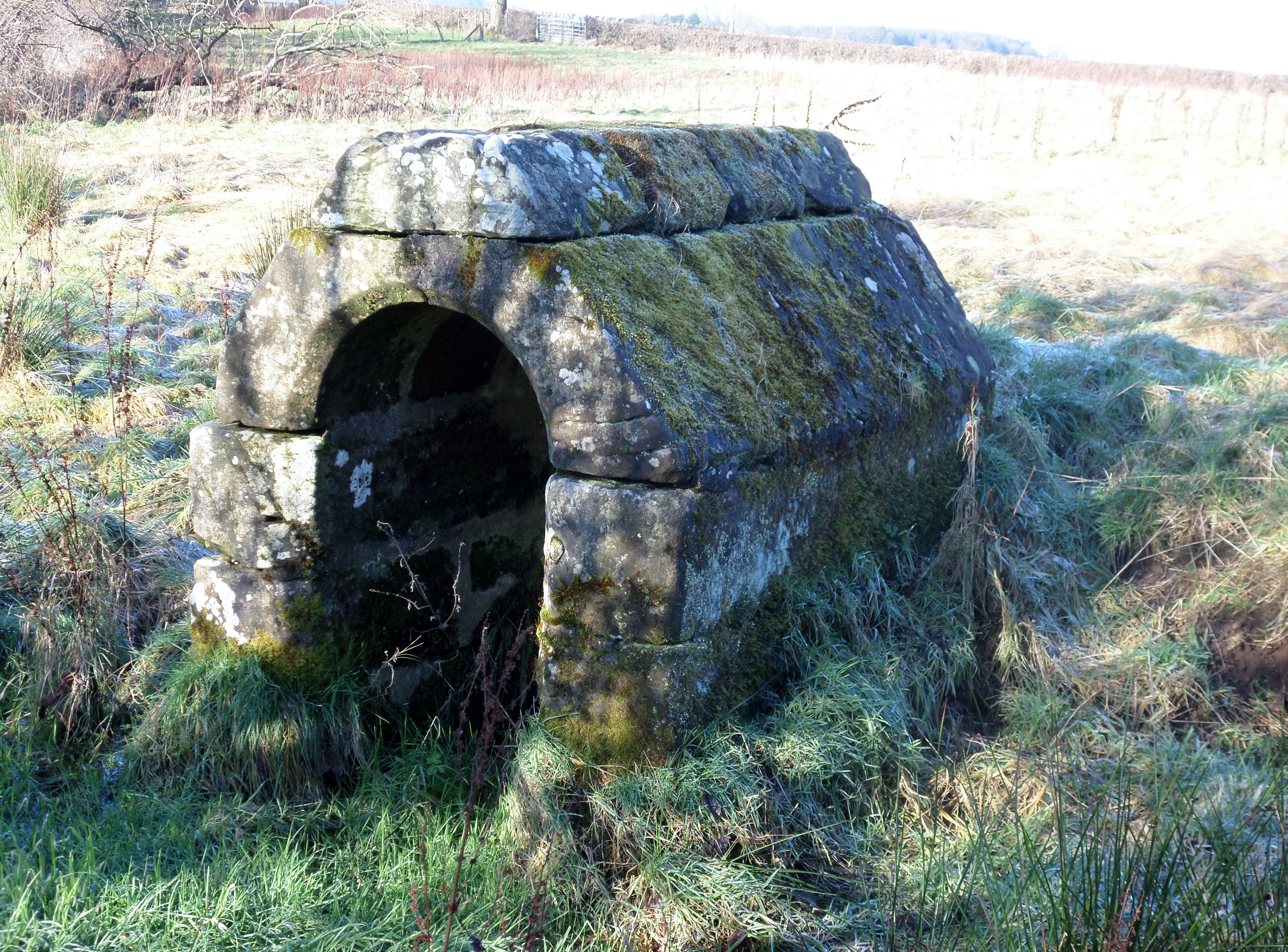
St Peter's Well, a historic holy well beside the village.

Houston's has a long association with St Peter, providing the village's historic name of Kilpeter. Its current parish church, Houston and Killellan Church or Kirk, lies in the grounds of Houston House. The Kirk was constructed in the 1870s, replacing a church on the same site constructed in 1775, and dedicated to Archibald Alexander Speirs of Elderslie. Following his death aged 28 while sitting as Member of Parliament for West Renfrewshire, his mother provided the building costs as a memorial.

The current parish dates from 1771, when the parishes of Houston and Killellan were united. The former parish church in the nearby hamlet of Killellan was known as the Church of St Fillan, which the name of the settlement derives. The former church building was left redundant by the unification and was abandoned. The ruin, dated 1635 but believed to have originated in the 10th or 11th century, still stands some 4 miles (6 km) west of the centre of Houston on the Barochan Cross Road. This church is now held by the Kilallan Kirk Preservation Trust following its donation by Elderslie Estates in 2005 and is a scheduled historic monument. An annual evening service is held amongst the ruins in July by the congregation of the united parish. The church's manse, which is immediately adjacent to it, also finds continued use as a private residence and is thought to be the oldest existing dwellinghouse in Renfrewshire. St Fillan's Holy Well and St Fillan's Seat are located near to the old kirk.

St Peter's Well stands in a field below Greenhill Farm on Chapel Road close to the site of a pre-Reformation chapel and is a rare example of a covered or house holy well, the waters of which were once thought to ensure the safe return of travellers such as pilgrims.

The Houston and Kilellan church hall on Main Street was built immediately following the Disruption of 1843 as a separate congregation forming part of the Free Church of Scotland, and later the United Free Church of Scotland being known during this time as the West Kirk. Following the reunification of the United Free Church and the established Church of Scotland in 1929, the West Kirk existed as a second Church of Scotland congregation in the village until a fire destroyed much of the building in March 1941. The lack of a building caused the two congregations to again worship in the same parish church. The West Kirk building was fully restored by 1953, taking its place as the church hall it remains to this day.

St. Fillan's Roman Catholic Church, also on Main Street, was established in 1841 on a property called "Four Windings" now remembered in the name of an adjacent street.

== Economy ==
Chiefly serving a commuter village, Houston's chief local economic activity is agriculture, with some tertiary sector businesses such as local shops and public houses serving residents and visitors. There are a number of these shops and pubs in the old village, and a number of shops located on the boundary with Crosslee.

=== Public houses and brewing ===
The parish supports a number of public houses, with two located in the historic village centre: the Fox and Hounds on South Street and the Houston Inn on North Street, established in 1779 and 1784 respectively. Until 2010, a third, the Cross Keys Inn, lay on Main Street, with a name derived from the crossed keys symbol of St Peter as a reference to the village's original name, Kilpeter. It has since operated as a restaurant. A further restaurant and public house, the River Inn, lies in Crosslee and was formerly the Crosslee Inn and the Pine Trees.

The village hosts a regular beer festival/ A microbrewery, the Houston Brewing Company, also formerly operated from a building adjacent to the Fox and Hounds.

== Culture and community ==
There are a number of community organisations and events that take place in the village. The village's main park, Houston Public Park, is adjacent to the old village, with others at South Street and Ardgryffe Park among the more modern housing developments.

Houston Public Park is the venue for the village's annual agricultural show, taking place in the summer and organised by the Houston and Killellan Agricultural Society. Another significant local event is the Kirk Carnival, organised by the parish church and focused around the church hall and Carrick Centre on Main Street, which involves a parade and a number of stalls and entertainments and including the local primary schools.

In 1992, Strathgryffe Tennis Squash and Fitness Club, opened with support from the Lawn Tennis Association and the National Lottery Sports Fund, is also located in the village. An equestrian club, the Kilmacolm and Kilallan Riding Club is based on the boundary of the parish. A foxhunt, the Lanarkshire and Renfrewshire Foxhounds, has operated from kennels in the village since 1850.

The village also hosts a lawn bowls club, the John G. Fleming Bowling Club, which was founded the local landowner whose name it bears to mark the diamond jubilee of Queen Victoria.

== Education ==
Gryffe High School is a non-denominational co-educational state secondary school which serves the village and surrounding settlements, most particularly neighbouring Bridge of Weir. The school has a strong academic reputation, and in 2009 was ranked as the seventh best-performing state secondary school in Scotland by The Times newspaper's league tables. Also in 2009, the school was praised in a report by Her Majesty's Inspectorate of Education.

There are two primary schools in Houston. Houston Primary School is a non-denominational school, whereas St Fillan's Primary School is a Roman Catholic faith school. Both are co-educational state schools. As stated above, Gryffe High School is the non-denominational secondary for the village whereas St. Benedict's High School is the Roman Catholic secondary serving Houston along with Bridge of Weir (which St. Fillan's also serves).

The 'old schoolhouse' at the north end of Main Street in the old village centre has been converted into self-catering accommodation and the former school at the south end of Main Street now exists as a community building known as the Carrick Centre.

== Public services ==
The territorial police force covering Houston is the Police Service of Scotland. It is part of the Renfrewshire and Inverclyde division and the Renfrew area Command. The nearest local police station is at Johnstone. There was a police station and police house in the village opened in the mid-1940s, which was closed in 2001.

For judicial purposes, the Houston forms part of the sheriffdom of North Strathclyde and public prosecutions are directed by the Procurator Fiscal for North Strathclyde. The Scottish Fire and Rescue Service is the statutory fire and rescue service covering the village and maintains three fire stations in Renfrewshire with the closest at Johnstone.

NHS Greater Glasgow and Clyde is the National Health Service Board providing public health care. The nearest major hospitals with accident and emergency facilities is the Royal Alexandra Hospital in Paisley. There is one medical practice in the village, which is linked to another surgery in Bridge of Weir.

Water and sewerage is provided by Scottish Water, a public body, and water and sewerage charges are collected alongside council tax by Renfrewshire Council, the local authority, on its behalf. Renfrewshire Council is also responsible for the provision of waste management in the area. The local distribution network operator, the organisation licensed to transmit electricity from the National Grid to consumers, is Scottish Power.

There is a Post Office branch in the village and the postal town, with a larger delivery centre, is Johnstone.
