= Craigends =

Coordinates: 55.861°N 4.525°W

- Location within Renfrewshire
- OS grid reference: NS419659
- Civil parish: Houston and Killellan
- Council area: Renfrewshire
- Lieutenancy area: Renfrewshire
- Country: Scotland
- Sovereign state: United Kingdom
- Post town: JOHNSTONE
- Postcode district: PA6
- Dialling code: 01505
- Police: Scotland
- Fire: Scottish
- Ambulance: Scottish
- UK Parliament: Paisley and Renfrewshire North
- Scottish Parliament: Renfrewshire South

Craigends is a residential area in the civil parish of Houston and Killellan in Renfrewshire, Scotland lying south of the River Gryffe and on the banks of the River Locher. Craigends is on the south-eastern edge of the village of Houston, bordering the parish's other village, Crosslee. As with most of Houston, Craigends is predominantly a commuter settlement.

Craigends was formerly an estate most notably the seat of the Cunninghames of Craigends, related to the nearby family of the same name who were the Earls of Glencairn, with their seat in Kilmacolm. Craigends House, a notable example of Scottish Baronial architecture designed by David Bryce was demolished in 1971. Ardgryfe House, a category B-listed Renaissance-style stone mansion built in 1867, is on Craigends Road.

The Craigends Yew is a circa 700 old layering yew tree grove located in the grounds of the old estate next to the River Gryfe. It is one of the largest of its species in Scotland.

== Etymology ==
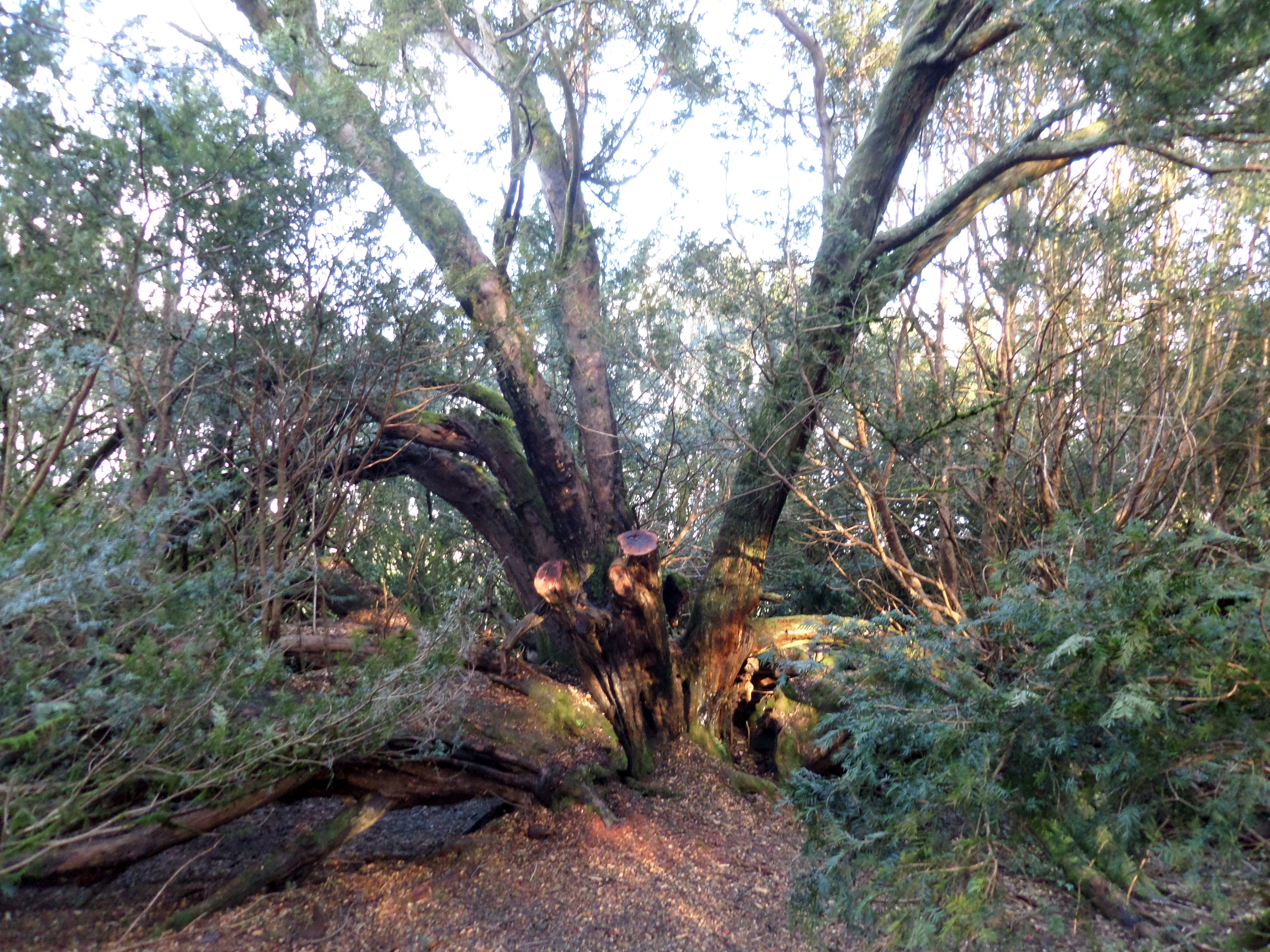
The Craigends Yew

The estate's name is of uncertain origin though it is likely that the Craig construct comes from the Scottish Gaelic creagh: "a steep rugged mass of rock projecting upward or outward".

Craigends does entail a number of igneous rock outcroppings: notably on the banks of the Gryffe near Crosslee, beneath the Gryffe Bridge, and in the centre of what is now Cunningham Gardens. It is interesting to speculate which (if any) of these features may have impressed on the ancient landscape to inspire the estate's name.

== History ==
On the 4 February 1479 Craigends was granted to William Cuninghame. William was the second son of the Earl of Glencairn and his entitlement created a new branch in the influential Cuninghame family of Ayrshire: the Cuninghames of Craigends. The first mansion house was built around this time by William; it would be the home to his descendants for over 400 years. Members of the family were elected to Parliament for Renfrewshire in 1643 and 1689.

John Charles Cuninghame, the 17th and final laird died in 1917. His estate and personal fortune was inherited by his widow, Alison Cuninghame, who maintained the mores of the landed gentry for decades to come. When she died in November 1958 the estate was inherited by a nephew. Not having the means to maintain the estate, however, the estate was left derelict and, after a few years, sold to the housing construction company Taylor Woodrow. The estate and mansion house were left abandoned for many years and fell into extreme dilapidation. In 1971 the mansion house was demolished and by 1973, Taylor Woodrow had started construction on the first of what would be many housing estates within the grounds.

== Lodge Craigends ==
In 1907, John Charles Cunninghame became one of the many benefactors in the establishment of a Masonic Lodge in the area. In addition to a financial donation, he also allowed the Lodge to use his family estate's name.

Lodge Craigends No 1042 was established in the nearby town of Linwood and continues to operate there. Craigends Social Club (the social arm of Lodge Craigends) has become a valuable facility which is used by many members of the local community.

== Landscape ==
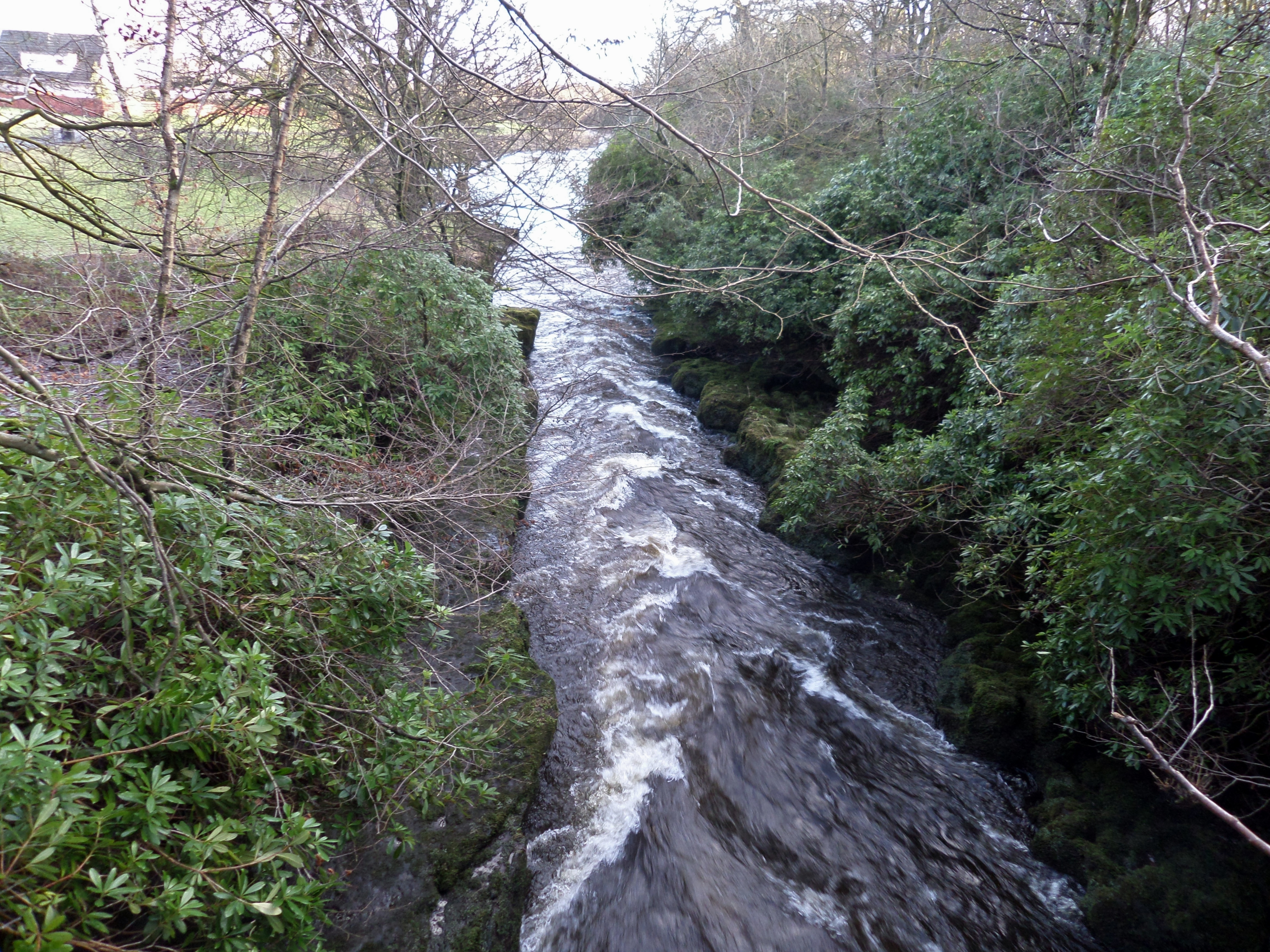
Craigends Falls, River Gryffe

Craigends straddles two rivers: the Gryffe and the Locher. Situated on rolling land the estate rises gently to its highest point in the southeast. Though now dominated by private houses, roads and pavements some ancient woodland remains - most notably in the west, along the banks of the Gryffe.
