= Baldwin of Biggar =

Scottish magnate

Baldwin of Biggar was a mid-12th century Scottish magnate. He was granted the lordship of Biggar, and was made Sheriff of Lanark/Clydesdale by David I, King of Scotland.

Baldwin and Herbert, Bishop of Glasgow commanded the Scottish forces at the Battle of Renfrew in 1164. It is likely that Baldwin was responsible for the considerable settlement of Flemish settlers in the Lanark/Clydesdale region.

Baldwin held the fee of Inverkip as tenant from Walter fitz Alan. Baldwin also held the fee of Kilpeter from Walter, and Kilpeter in fee to Hugh of Pettinain, from whom it took its later name, Houston ("Hugh's tun or manor"). The lands of Pettinain were situated between Baldwin's lands of Biggar and the Lanark Castle, from where Baldwin administrated the entire region. It is very likely that both Baldwin and Hugh were Flemish. Baldwin's stepson, John, was the eponym of Crawfordjohn. He was succeeded by his son Waltheof.
