= Renfrewshire (historic) =

Historic county and lieutenancy area of western Scotland

Coordinates: 55°50′N 4°30′W

- Renfrewshire within Scotland
- Area
  - 1975: 245 sq mi (630 km^{2}) (27th)
- Population
  - 2014 est: 346,470
  - 1981 est: 366,509
- History
  - Origin: Lordship of Strathgryfe
  - Succeeded by: Strathclyde Region
- Status: Local government county (until 1975); Lieutenancy area (1794–present); Land registration county (1996–present)
- Chapman code: RFW
- Government: County: Renfrewshire County Council (1890–1975); District: Eastwood District Council, Renfrew District Council, Inverclyde District Council (1975–1996); Modern: East Renfrewshire Council, Inverclyde Council, Renfrewshire Council (1996–present); Lieutenancy: Lord Lieutenant of Renfrewshire (1794–present)
  - HQ: Renfrew (county town); Paisley (County Council headquarters)
  - Motto: Avito viret honore ('Flourishing through ancestral honour')
- Coat of arms of the county council

Renfrewshire or the County of Renfrew is a historic county, registration county and lieutenancy area in the west central Lowlands of Scotland. The lieutenancy area covers the three modern council areas of Inverclyde, Renfrewshire and East Renfrewshire, and this area is occasionally termed Greater Renfrewshire to distinguish it from the modern council area called Renfrewshire. The historic county additionally included territory on the south-western edge of Glasgow which was gradually transferred to the administrative area of the city as it grew.

The county borders Glasgow and Lanarkshire to the east and Ayrshire to the south and west. The Firth of Clyde forms its northern boundary, with Dunbartonshire and Argyll on the opposing banks.

Renfrewshire's early history is marked by ancient British and Roman settlement. Renfrewshire can trace its origin to the feudal lands at Strathgryfe granted to Walter FitzAlan, the first High Steward of Scotland. Renfrewshire was created as a shire in the early fifteenth century, having previously been part of Lanarkshire. The county was named after its original county town, the royal burgh of Renfrew.

During the Industrial Revolution, many of the larger towns became important centres of commerce and manufacturing. The goods produced were chiefly cottons, calicos and silks building on the county's long weaving heritage. Other industries such as ship building, distilleries and printworks also contributed to the economy. Paisley grew to become the largest urban and commercial centre in the county by some margin. Renfrewshire County Council existed from 1890 until 1975, and was based in Paisley.

Parts of the county, such as Pollokshaws in 1912 and Nitshill in 1926, were incorporated into Glasgow during the early 20th century as the city expanded. Renfrewshire was abolished for local government purposes in 1975, being replaced by the Strathclyde region and three lower-tier district councils. These were in turn abolished in 1996, since when the Renfrewshire area has been governed by the three council areas of Renfrewshire, East Renfrewshire and Inverclyde.

== History ==
=== Toponymy ===
The name of Renfrewshire derives from its county town, Renfrew, which has been attested since the Roman occupation of Britain. The name is believed to originate from Common Brittonic/Cumbric, from ren, as in Scottish Gaelic: rinn, or as in Welsh: rhyn (a point or cape of land) and from frew, as in Welsh: fraw, or ffrau (flow of water). This suggests a point of land near the flow of water, such as at the confluence of the Cart and Clyde rivers. It is rendered in Latin: Praefectura Renfroana.

The area is sometimes known as Greater Renfrewshire to distinguish it from the Renfrewshire council area.

=== Early history ===
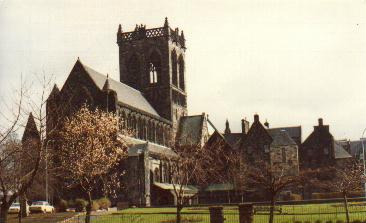
Paisley Abbey

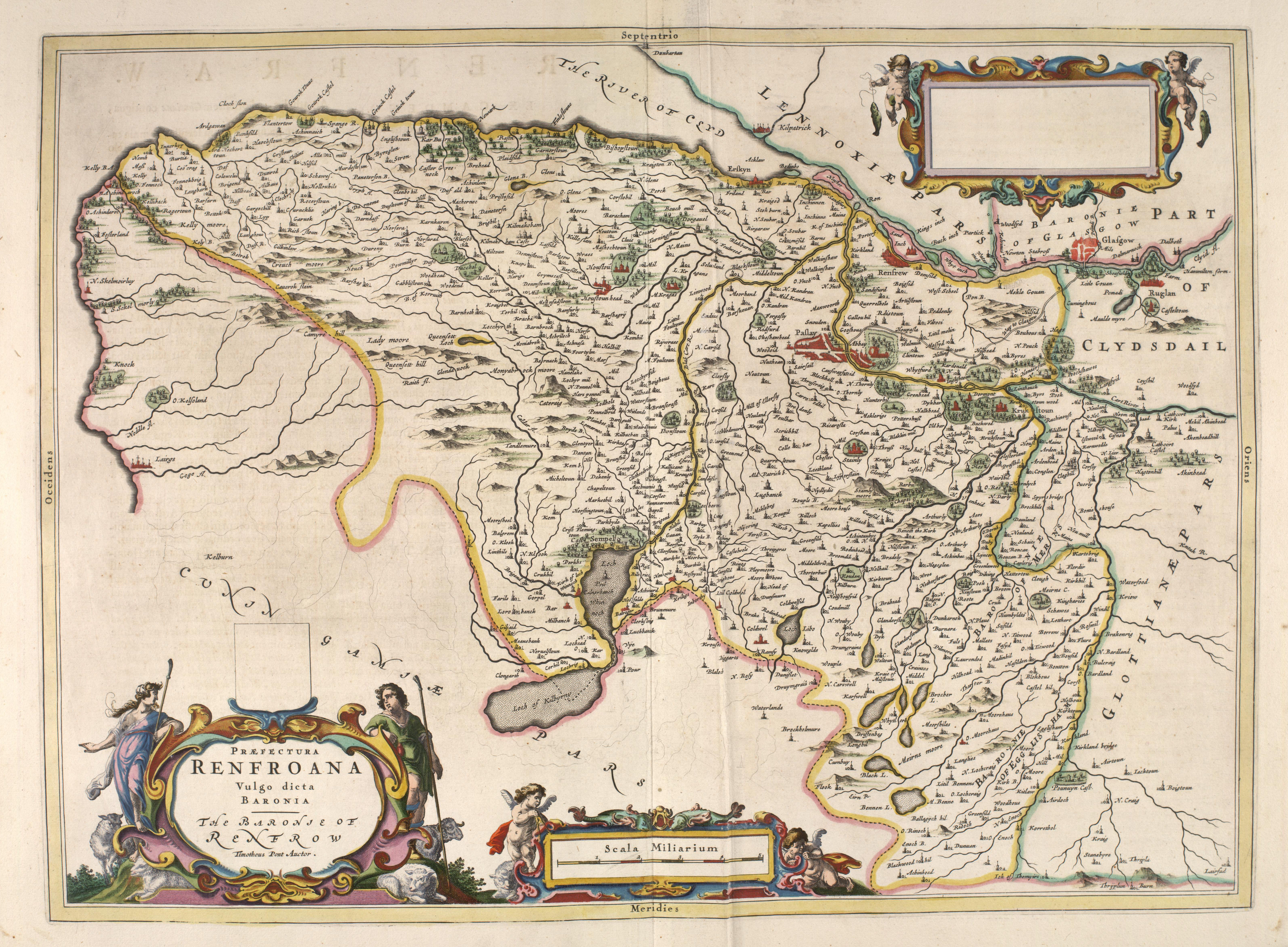
Extent of Renfrewshire in 1654. The present-day city of Glasgow expanded into the north-east of the county.

The earliest evidence of human activity in the area is traces of an Iron Age fort in the Busby area and a pre-Roman settlement in Overlee. When the Romans advanced in the year 80 from the Solway Firth, the territory that would later become Renfrewshire was occupied by the Damnonii, a British tribe.

The principal Roman stronghold in the area was at Vanduara (Paisley). Following the end of Roman rule in Britain in 410, the Cumbrian Britons, with their capital at Dumbarton, retained a hold on all the territory west of the Lothian — the Kingdom of Strathclyde. During the High Middle Ages, Strathclyde was conquered by the Kingdom of Alba, which in turn developed into the Kingdom of Scotland.

In the 12th century, during the reign of David I of Scotland, the Anglo-Norman nobleman Walter FitzAlan fled the English county of Shropshire on account of the conflict between the Empress Matilda and Stephen. Walter rallied to the support of the Empress, but when her cause was lost Walter befriended David I, King of Scots and an uncle of Matilda, and became David's Dapifer or Steward, as the first Lord High Steward of Scotland. Accompanied by his brother Simon, Walter came to Scotland about 1136 and fought for Scotland at the Battle of the Standard at Northallerton in 1138 under the command of David I's son, Prince Henry.

FitzAlan settled in the area and was granted the lands of Strathgryfe, which provided a basis for the later county, by David I. In 1163 Walter founded, first at Renfrew but shortly afterwards at Paisley, a house of monks of the Cluniac order drawn from the priory of Much Wenlock, in his native county of Shropshire. The monastery steadily grew and by 1219 became Paisley Abbey.

It is traditionally believed that Sir William Wallace, a knight and military leader during the period surrounding the Wars of Scottish Independence, was born in 1272 at Elderslie in the county.

=== Emergence of the county ===
The descendants of Walter FitzAlan would eventually form the powerful House of Stuart, with 'Stuart' or 'Stewart' being a corruption of 'Steward'. The Stewarts controlled the territory that would later become Renfrewshire as a barony which lay within the larger shire of Lanarkshire.

In 1371, Robert Stewart was crowned King of Scotland following a marriage between his father Walter Stewart, 6th High Steward of Scotland and Marjorie Bruce, daughter of King Robert I of Scotland. Sometime in the early fifteenth century, probably between 1404 and 1414, the barony of Renfrew was given its own sheriff, making it independent from Lanarkshire. The new shire was named after the town of Renfrew, the site of Renfrew Castle, which was the seat of the Stewarts. From this point onwards, the county has been closely tied to the monarchy and the heir apparent to the British monarch holds the title of Baron of Renfrew as well as High Steward of Scotland.

=== Modern history ===
Renfrewshire was significantly involved in the Radical War of 1820, with many of the local industrial workers participating in the rioting and strikes.

In the Second World War, Renfrewshire suffered due to its shipbuilding industries on the banks of the River Clyde. Heavy bombing was inflicted over the 6th and 7 May 1941 in an event referred to as the Greenock Blitz. On 10 May 1941, Rudolf Hess, a leading official in the government of Nazi Germany, parachuted into a field near Eaglesham on a secret mission to meet Douglas Douglas-Hamilton, 14th Duke of Hamilton for peace negotiations, and was instead arrested by a farmhand with a pitchfork and imprisoned. It is believed Hess was privately distressed by the war with the United Kingdom as he had hoped that Britain would accept Germany as an ally. Hess may have hoped to score a diplomatic victory by sealing a peace between the German Reich and British Empire.

The county was abolished for local government purposes in 1975, becoming three districts within the Strathclyde region. Further local government reorganisation in 1996 saw the area become the three council areas of East Renfrewshire, Inverclyde, and Renfrewshire.

== Governance ==
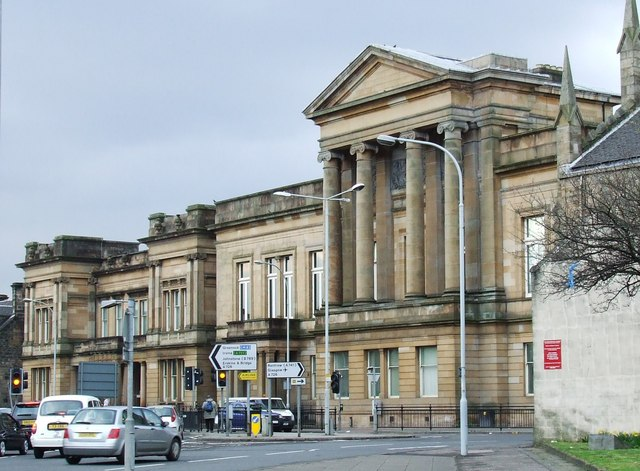
Paisley Sheriff Court (on the left) and the former County Buildings (on the right)

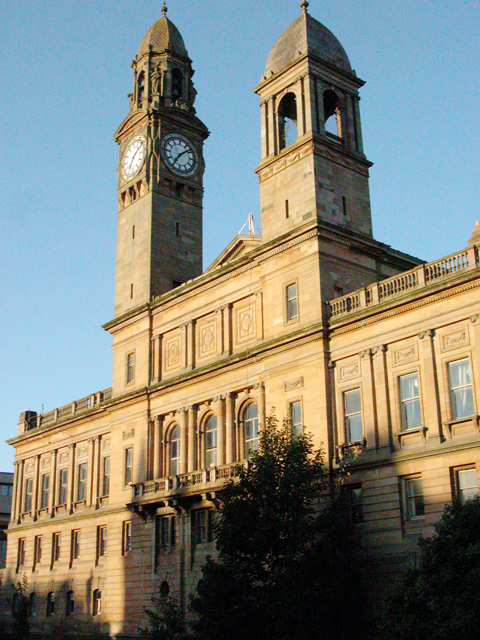
Paisley town hall, part of the dual system of local government within Renfrewshire.

=== Historic local government ===
Shires of Scotland traditionally mirrored sheriffdoms with the county's sheriff holding considerable powers. From 1667, Scotland's counties outside the burghs were governed by Commissioners of Supply with powers to raise taxes and administer local government. However the judicial roles of the sheriff continued to overlap with executive government in their shires. In 1794, the first Lord Lieutenant of Renfrewshire, William McDowall, was appointed when permanent lieutenancies were appointed by Royal Warrant to all the counties of Scotland as the monarch's military representative.

Historically Renfrewshire's Commissioners of Supply met at Renfrew, as the county town, along with the Quarter Sessions and freeholders of the county. The sheriff court also met at Renfrew until 1705, when it was moved to Paisley. By the late 1800s the commissioners met at both Renfrew and Paisley.

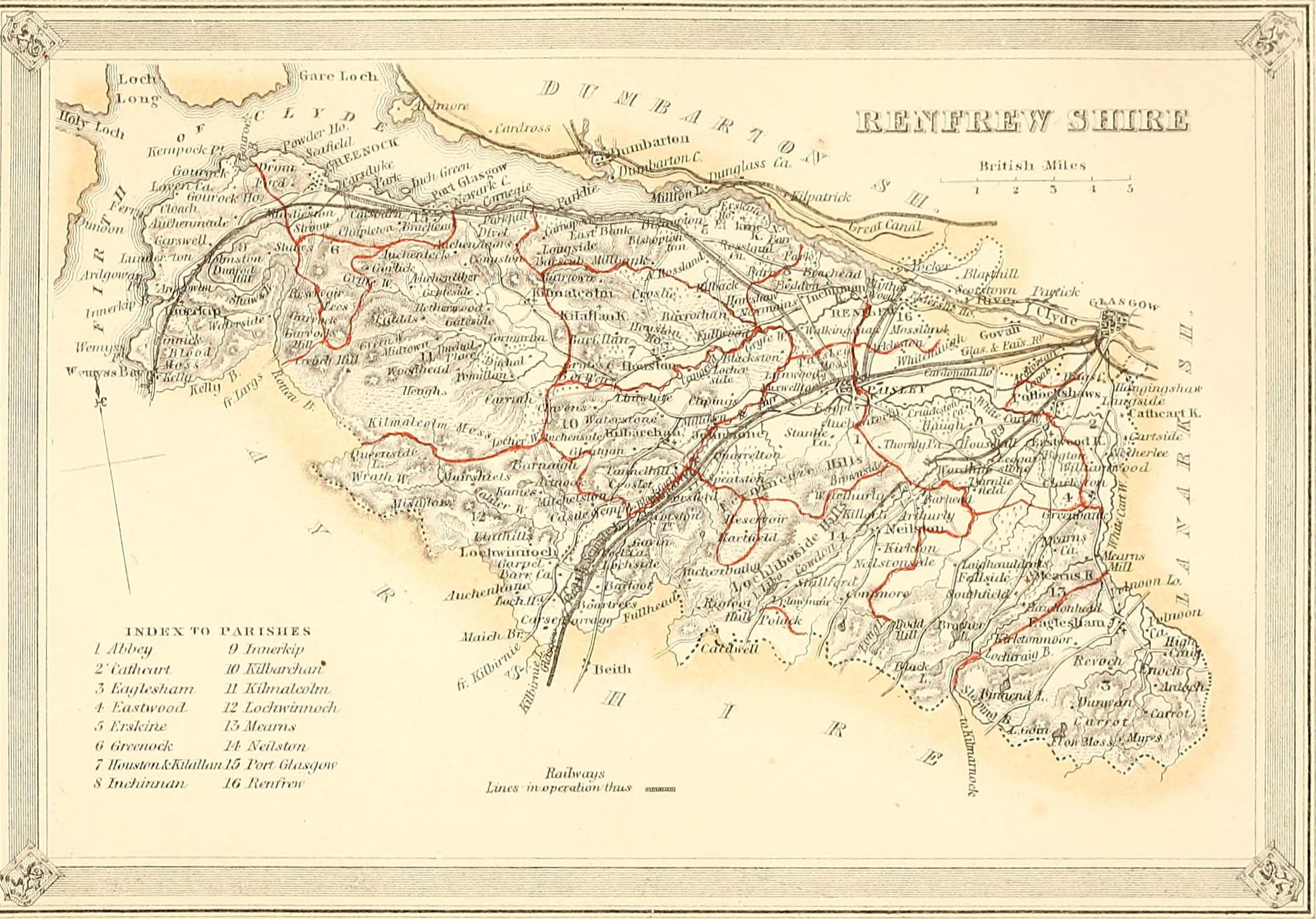
Map of Renfrewshire in the Imperial Gazetteer of Scotland, 1868

Elected county councils were established in 1890 under the Local Government (Scotland) Act 1889, taking most of the functions of the commissioners (which were eventually abolished in 1930). The three Renfrewshire burghs of Greenock, Paisley, and Port Glasgow were deemed large enough to manage their own affairs and so were excluded from the administrative area of the county council. Renfrewshire County Council held its first meeting on 22 May 1890 at the County Hall in Paisley, a courthouse which had been built in 1820. The county council was chaired by the convener of the county, a position formerly held by the convener of the Commissioners of Supply. The final Convener of the county to have chaired the Commissioners of Supply was West Renfrewshire's Member of Parliament Archibald Campbell MP.

Further local government reform in 1930 under the Local Government (Scotland) Act 1929 brought Greenock, Paisley, and Port Glasgow under the control of the county council. During this time, several parts of eastern Renfrewshire were transferred into the growing city of Glasgow, including Cathcart, parts of Govan, and parts of the Parish of Renfrew lying north of the River Clyde (containing Yoker, Scotstoun and Jordanhill).

Following the Local Government (Scotland) Act 1973, Renfrewshire was incorporated into the Strathclyde region and divided amongst three districts: Renfrew District, Eastwood District and Inverclyde District. The Act created a two-tier local government structure, with both districts and regions having elected councils and sharing responsibility for local government. The Local Government etc. (Scotland) Act 1994 abolished district and regional councils, replacing them with the current unitary council areas which in Renfrewshire were broadly based on the districts created by the 1973 Act. These local government areas are Renfrewshire, formed from Renfrew District excluding Barrhead; Inverclyde, formed from Inverclyde District and East Renfrewshire formed from Eastwood District plus Barrhead.

==== Divisions ====
Before the creation of current single tier local authorities, there were typically a number of divisions within counties with varying levels of local government powers. Burghs generally covered urbanised areas with rural parts of a county divided into districts.

The Local Government (Scotland) Act 1947 (10 & 11 Geo. 6. c. 43) defines the division of parts of the county which had pre-existed as:

- Large burghs: the towns of Paisley, Greenock and Port Glasgow. These burghs continued to be responsible for most local services such as roads, water and housing.
- Small burghs: the towns of Renfrew, Johnstone, Barrhead and Gourock were responsible for services such as housing, parks and cleansing.
- Landward areas: all parts of the county that were not parts of a burgh, including the smaller settlements such as Bishopton and Clarkston. There were parish councils until 1930 when they were replaced by landward district councils with limited powers, such as over parks and recreation.

Aside from burghs and parishes, the county was subdivided between a number of higher tiers of local government during certain points in its history. Between the 1880s and the early 20th century, it is recorded that the county is divided between an 'Upper Ward' consisting of the eastern two-thirds of the county centred on Paisley, and a 'Lower Ward' approximating the boundaries of the modern Inverclyde council area and consisting of the parishes of Inverkip, Greenock, Port Glasgow and Kilmacolm, with Greenock as district centre.

In 1973, prior to the abolition of the county council under the Local Government (Scotland) Act 1973, there were five districts in the landward areas of the county. The First District in the west formed part of Inverclyde District; the Second, Third and Fourth Districts in the geographical centre were grouped to form Renfrew District and the Fifth District in the east formed Eastwood District.

==== County Buildings ====
The county council formerly met in the County Buildings, a Gothic style constructed in County Square in Paisley c. 1817 and demolished in the 1960-70s. New County Buildings were constructed in 1890 on Paisley's St James's Street in the Classical style and are now used to house Paisley's Sheriff Court. The County Council Chamber is now Court 8 within the building.

=== Modern functions ===
==== Lieutenancy ====
Whilst no longer used as a local authority area, Renfrewshire remains used for ceremonial purposes as a Lieutenancy area. The Lord Lieutenant and a number of Deputy Lieutenants represent the monarch in the county, performing a number of ceremonial functions and arranging and co-ordinating Royal visits. When the county was abolished for local government purposes in 1975 the lieutenancy area was redefined to correspond to the new districts of Eastwood, Inverclyde, and Renfrew.

The incumbent Lord Lieutenant of Renfrewshire since 2019 is Colonel Peter McCarthy. The Renfrewshire lieutenancy operates out of the headquarters of East Renfrewshire Council in Giffnock.

==== Registration county ====
The County of Renfrew is a registration county used for land registration under the authority of the Land Registration (Scotland) Act 1979. For this purpose, the county is defined as it existed in 1868 and so includes several areas subsequently annexed to Glasgow. The Renfrewshire registration county was the first to introduce the new Land Register of Scotland on the 6 April 1981.

==== Other ====
For a number of purposes, the three modern local councils in the county co-operate on a number of matters. Renfrewshire is retained as a Joint Valuation Board area, which values properties for the purposes of council tax and non-domestic rates, and is also used for electoral registration. Councillors from the three local councils also join, in association with other local groups, to form the Renfrewshire Education Trust which makes educational-related grants in the county. There is a Renfrewshire Civil Contingencies Service, the first civil contingencies planning body in Scotland to adopt the shared services model of co-operation between local authorities.

Central government bodies also use the historic boundaries of the area for some purposes. 'Scottish Enterprise Renfrewshire', a non-departmental public body accountable to the devolved Scottish Parliament which encourages enterprise and economic development, covers the three modern council areas in the county.

Renfrewshire was officially a postal county used for administrative purposes by Royal Mail. Whilst this system has not been used for sorting mail since 1996, Royal Mail still keeps and distributes data relating to postal counties in the United Kingdom.

=== Parliamentary representation ===
Following the Act of Union 1707, which created Great Britain as a sovereign state, Renfrewshire was a county constituency for elections to the House of Commons in Parliament. The town of Renfrew was not included in the county constituency, being a parliamentary burgh, and from 1832 the other burghs of Greenock, Paisley and Port Glasgow were similarly excluded.

Following the Redistribution of Seats Act 1885, Renfrewshire was mainly divided into four constituencies . These were the county constituencies of East Renfrewshire and West Renfrewshire; and the burgh constituencies of Paisley and Greenock. From 1832, Port Glasgow and Renfrew had been part of the Kilmarnock Burghs constituency and remained as such, only being absorbed into West and East Renfrewshire respectively in 1918 with the passage of the Representation of the People Act 1918.

The distribution of seats remained generally stable during Renfrewshire's time as an administrative county. In 1974, the constituency of Greenock was abolished and joined with Port Glasgow to create the constituency of Greenock and Port Glasgow.

With counties abolished for local government purposes, more wholesale reform of the constituency system in Scotland occurred in the 1980s, following the Third Periodic Review carried out by the Boundary Commission for Scotland, and a number of alterations were made before settling on the present system for the 2005 General Election laid out in the Fifth Periodic Review. Today, two of the three local council areas in the County of Renfrew have a single constituency: East Renfrewshire and Inverclyde, whilst the Renfrewshire council area is divided into the constituencies of Paisley and Renfrewshire North and Paisley and Renfrewshire South.

== Geography ==
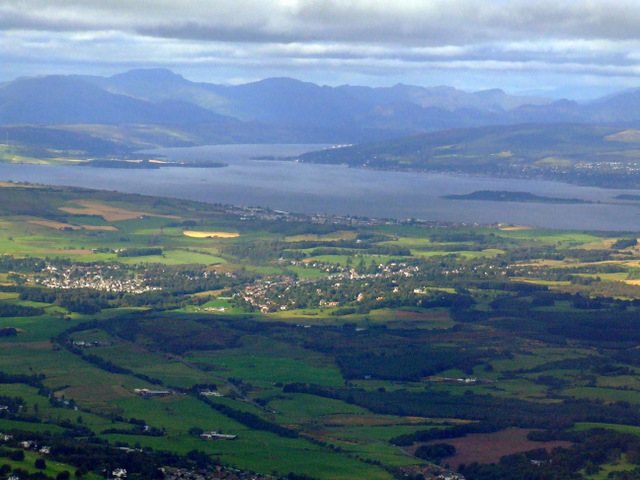
View of Kilmacolm and Port Glasgow towards the River Clyde.

Francis Hindes Groome's Ordnance Gazetteer for Scotland observes that the geography of the county can be seen as "falling into three divisions - hilly, gently rising, and flat". The higher areas are found to the south and west, particularly into the Renfrewshire Hills and to the border with Ayrshire, with large areas of moorland.

The land slopes downward to the River Clyde with the River Cart (formed by the White Cart Water and Black Cart Water) and the River Gryffe, all of which eventually flow into the River Clyde, providing drainage to the lower parts of the area.

In the west of Renfrewshire can be found a number of small bodies of water such as Loch Thom and the Gryfe Reservoir, with Barr Loch and Castle Semple Loch in the south. A number of smaller hills and lochs are in the south-east in the county, with the Dams to Darnley Country Park separating Newton Mearns and Barrhead with a number of artificially dammed lakes including Balgray Reservoir, Ryat Linn Reservoir and Waulkmill Glen Reservoir.

The upper scenery of the county was described in the 1911 Encyclopædia Britannica as "somewhat wild and bleak" though descending into pastureland around the rivers. The north-east of the county is heavily urbanised and forms part of the Greater Glasgow conurbation.

The geology of the Renfrewshire is notable for its volcanic origins.

== Economy ==
=== Textiles ===
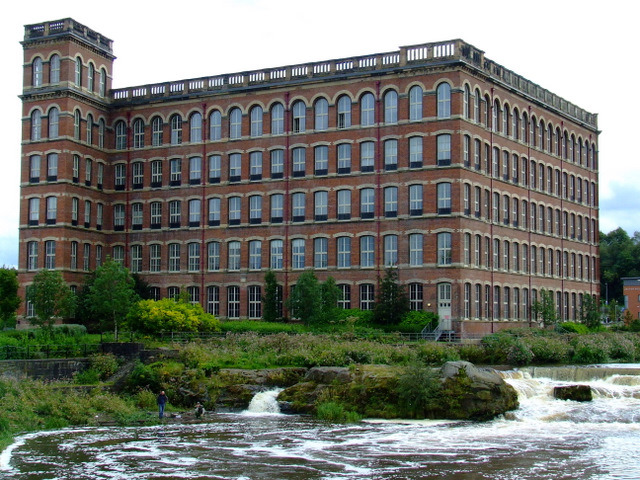
The Anchor Mills (1886) thread mill – a remnant of Paisley's Victorian industrial heritage.

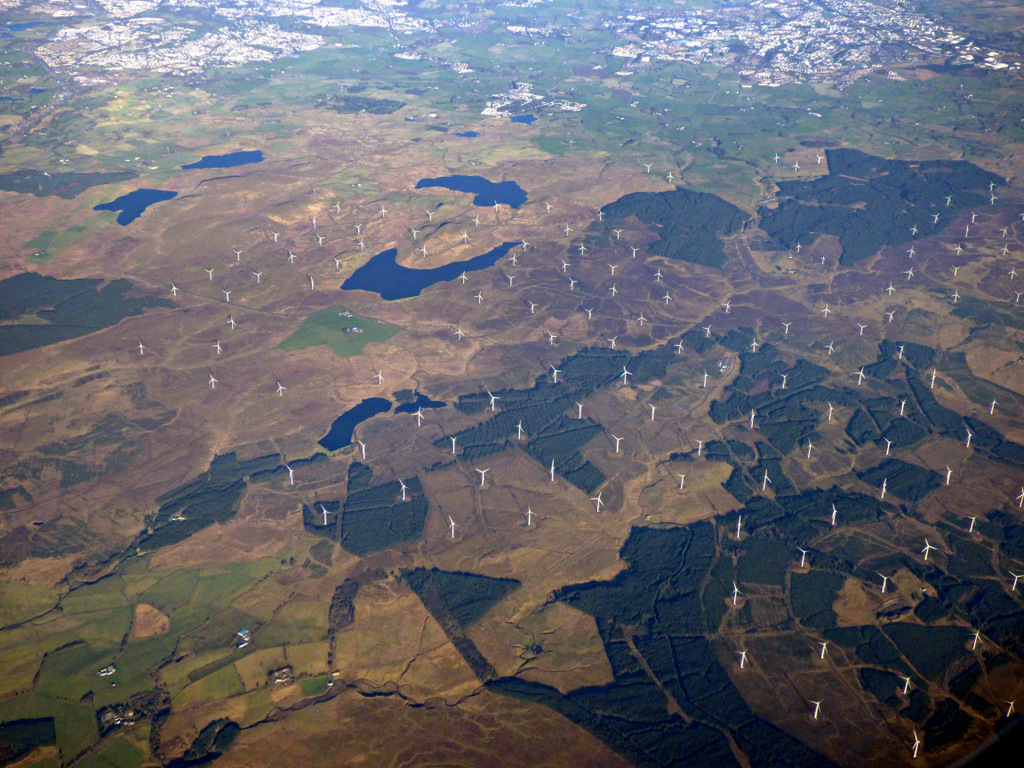
Whitelee Wind Farm

The traditional industries of Renfrewshire were noted for their variety and diversity. Weaving and associated trades were common in the county and Paisley became particularly notable for this industry. The Paisley pattern remains a symbol of the area and its weaving past to this day.

Prior to the 19th century, weaving was largely a cottage industry which took place around the towns and villages of the county. The Industrial Revolution saw the emergence of large-scale mills, with many concentrating in Paisley. In the 1930s, around 28,000 people were employed in the Coats mills in the town.

=== Trade and shipbuilding ===
Greenock's coastal position made the county an early centre for overseas trade. Shipbuilding on the River Clyde, particularly at Renfrew and Port Glasgow became significant in the later part of the 19th century. These emerged into the Lower Clyde Shipyards. Of the industry, only Ferguson Marine Engineering in Port Glasgow remains today. Many of the county's traditional industries were driven by export strength, with examples such as sugar refining, foundry-work, rope-making, machine-making, mineral work and the manufacture of chemicals are all noted as significant to the economy of Renfrewshire in the 1880s Gazetteer for Scotland entry, with the central areas for commerce noted as being Greenock and Port Glasgow. Shipping continues in Greenock at the Ocean Terminal docks.

Greenock's ports remain active today with shipping from Ocean Terminal docks.

=== Modern industries ===
During the second half of the 20th century, some parts of the county experienced the effects of deindustrialisation. In modern times, many of the settlements in the centre and east of Renfrewshire serve as commuter towns within the Greater Glasgow area. All three local authority in the county are partners in the Glasgow City Region City Deal, an investment scheme part of wider UK City Deals to promote investment and economic growth.

In the south-east of Renfrewshire on Eaglesham Moor can be found Whitelee Wind farm, the largest on-shore wind farm in the United Kingdom.

== Culture ==
=== County symbols ===
Stewart arms feature often in the heraldry of the county.

The coat of arms of Renfrewshire was granted to the county council in 1899. The lymphad or galley is taken from the arms of the county town, Renfrew, which once served as an important port on the River Clyde. The shield of arms are those of the Royal House of Stewart, recognising the county as 'cradle of the Stewart Kings'. The blazon of the arms is "Azure; a lymphad, sails furled, argent, on a shield or, pendent from the mast, a fess checky azure and argent".

Another symbol associated with the county is the Prince of Wales's feathers badge, demonstrating the heir to the throne's connections as Baron Renfrew. It was used historically on badges of local army and militia regiments, as well as the cap badges of the former Renfrewshire Constabulary.

The Paisley pattern is used as the logo of Renfrewshire Council, one of the three modern local authorities in the county. Ships are featured commonly in the heraldry of towns, as well as the coat of arms of Renfrewshire Council (which uses a similar device to the county arms) and Inverclyde Council, noting the county's position on the banks of the River Clyde.

In 2002, the charity Plantlife organised a UK-wide competition to categorise county flowers, of which Renfrewshire's is unofficially the Bogbean.

There is a Renfrewshire tartan 'for use by anyone from or associated with the County of Renfrewshire' recorded on the official Scottish Register of Tartans.

=== Sport ===
There are two professional association football teams in the county, Paisley's St Mirren F.C. and Greenock Morton F.C. Both compete within the Renfrewshire derby and annually for the Renfrewshire Cup. There are a number of rugby union clubs who participate in the Scottish West Regional League including Paisley RFC, Birkmyre RFC in Kilmacolm and Bishopton RFC .

A number of local clubs participate in Western Division Cricket Union, including East Renfrewshire CC in Giffnock, Ferguslie CC in Paisley, Greenock CC, Inverclyde CC in Gourock, Kelburne CC in Paisley and Renfrew CC. The Paisley Pirates ice hockey team is based at Braehead Arena.

Renfrewshire houses five extant King George's Fields, part of a network of playing fields given to the memory of George V of the United Kingdom. These green spaces are legally protected by UK charity Fields in Trust.

== Transport ==
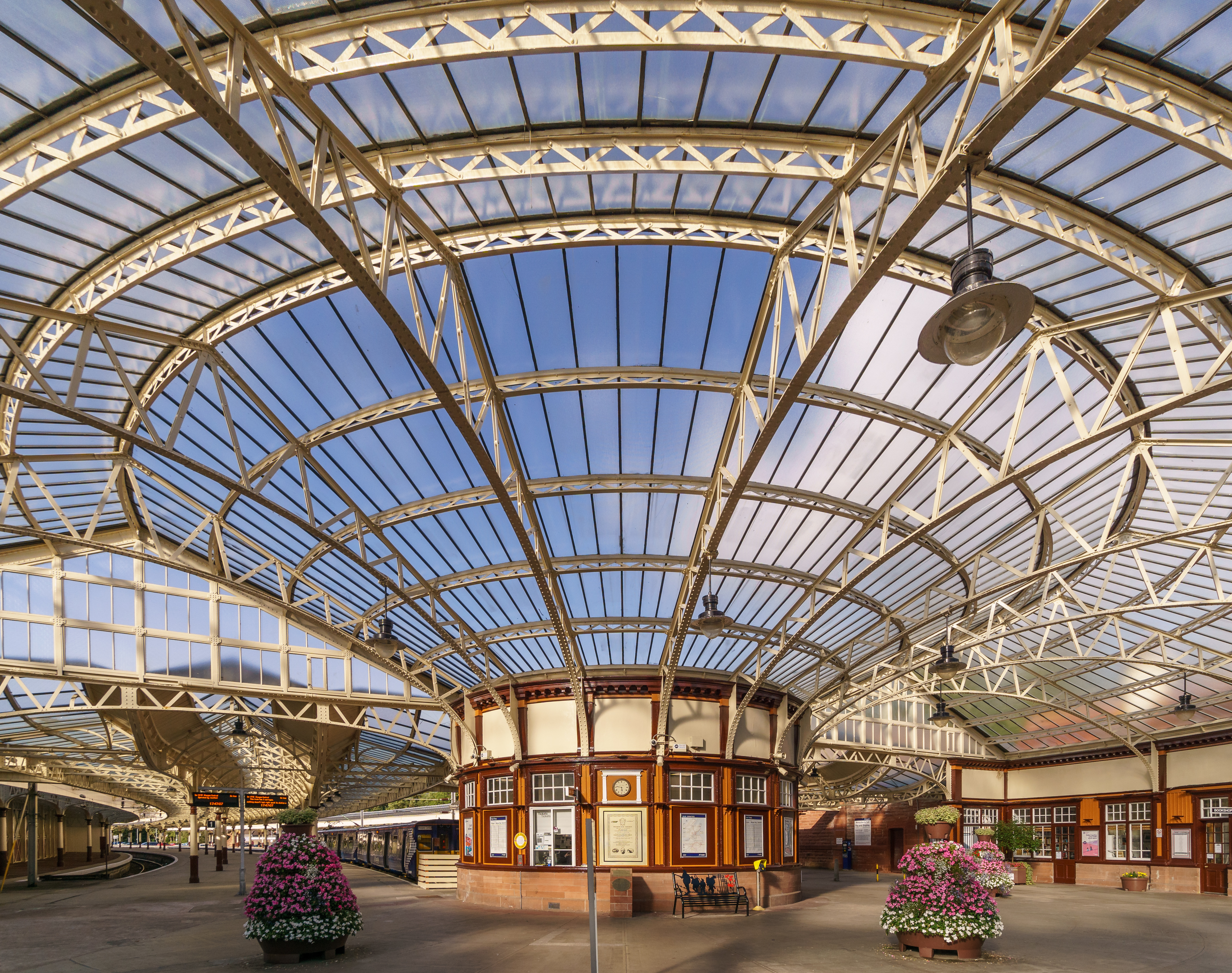
Interior of Wemyss Bay railway station

The Inverclyde Line links Greenock to Glasgow by rail; a number of suburban train lines connect the areas of Glasgow that fall within Renfrewshire.

Ferries connect Gourock to Kilcreggan on the Rosneath peninsula and Dunoon on the Cowal peninsula. From Wemyss Bay one can catch a ferry to Rothesay on the Isle of Bute.

Glasgow Airport is situated in the county just to the north of Paisley, providing flights to a number of national and international destinations.

== Notable people ==
- Sir William Arrol - engineer
- John Galt - novelist
- David Stow - educationalist
- King Robert II of Scotland - first monarch of the Scottish and British royal House of Stewart
- Robert Tannahill - Paisley-based poet
- Sir William Wallace - military commander believed to have originated at Elderslie
- James Watt - engineer and steam-engine pioneer from Greenock
- Alexander Wilson - poet and naturalist
- John Witherspoon - clergyman, academic and a Founding Father of the United States of America
- John Maclean - born in Pollokshaws in 1879.-
- Phyllis Logan - actress

== Settlements ==
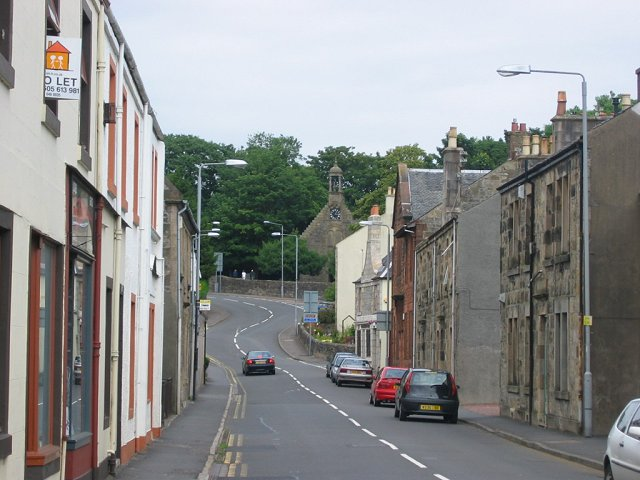
Lochwinnoch, one of the larger villages in the central area of the county.

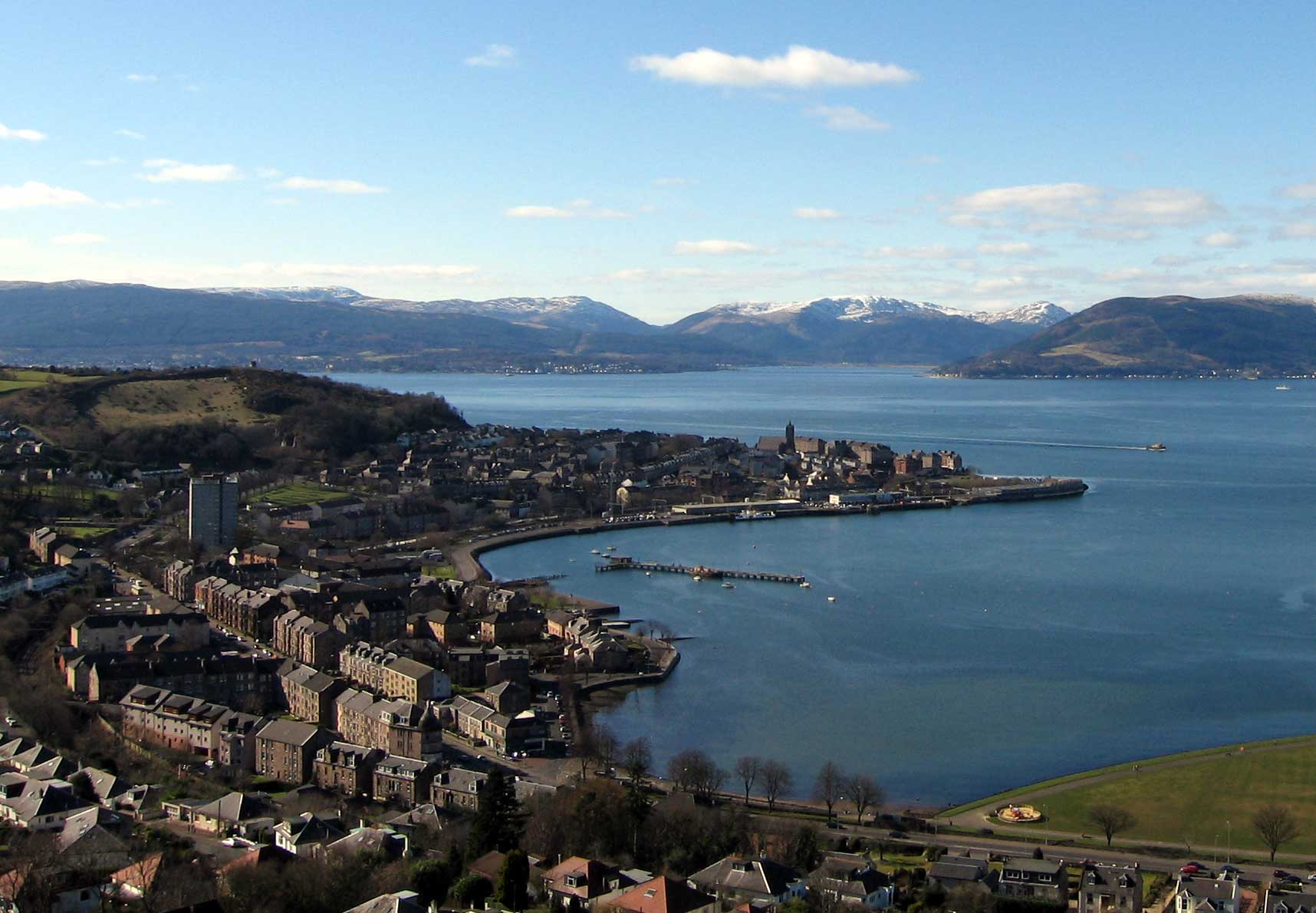
Gourock in the west of the county, on the Firth of Clyde.

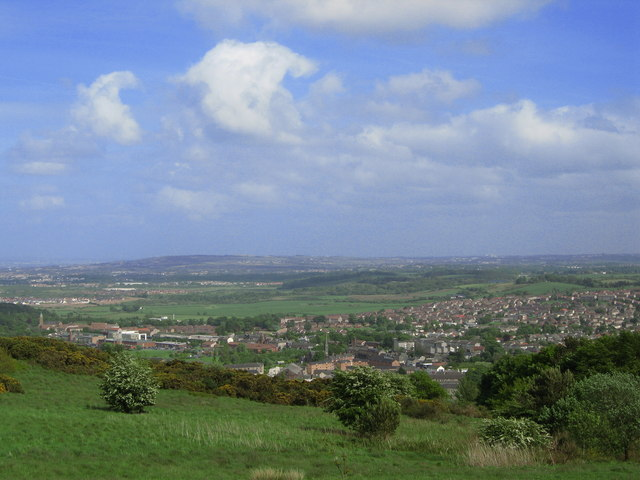
Barrhead on the south-west fringe of Glasgow

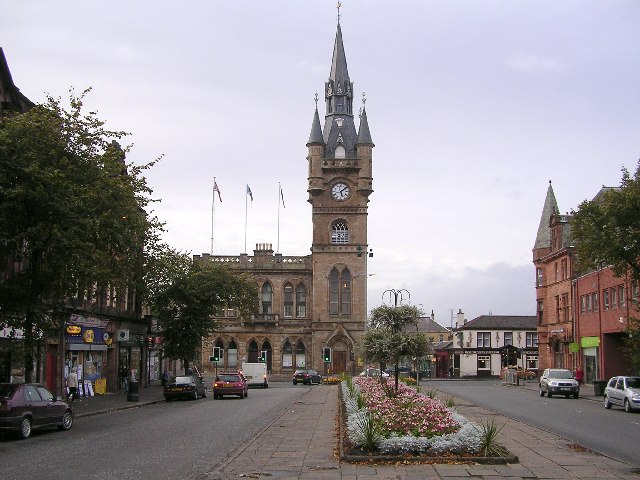
Renfrew town hall

In modern times, the chief settlements in Renfrewshire have been the towns of Paisley and Greenock and to this day they retain their status as the county's largest and second largest towns respectively. In the late 19th century, the county was subdivided into two wards centred on these towns, the Upper Ward (Paisley) and Lower Ward (Greenock).

Renfrew was the only town in the county to hold status as a royal burgh. Three other considerable towns, Paisley, Greenock and Port Glasgow, were designated as parliamentary burghs. Barrhead, Pollokshaws (now part of the Glasgow City council area), Gourock, and Johnstone were, during parts of the 19th and 20th century, police burghs as a result of their larger population, giving greater powers of local governance to local burgh authorities. The county also contains a number of significantly sized villages, such as Kilmacolm, Neilston and Lochwinnoch.

These administrative separations are entirely extinct, with unitary councils in Renfrewshire's three modern council areas - Inverclyde (West), Renfrewshire (Central) and East Renfrewshire - holding full statutory powers of local government. Many of these settlements continue to be represented by community councils, sponsored by the local authority, albeit without any distinct powers.

=== List of settlements ===
The following is a list of present-day settlements that were part of historic Renfrewshire. Following boundary changes, a number fall outside of the three council areas and the registration county.

- Glasgow
- Anniesland (partly in Lanarkshire)
- Auldhouse
- Arden
- Cardonald
- Carnwadric
- Cathcart
- Corkerhill
- Crookston
- Crosshill
- Crossmyloof
- Darnley
- Deaconsbank
- Dumbreck
- Eastwood
- Hillington
- Househillwood
- Hurlet (part in East Renfrewshire)
- Jenny Lind
- Jordanhill
- Kennishead
- Kingston
- Knightswood (partly in Dunbartonshire)
- Langside
- Mansewood
- Merrylee
- Mosspark
- Mount Florida
- Muirend (part in East Renfrewshire)
- Newlands
- Nitshill
- Oatlands (partly in Lanarkshire)
- Parkhouse
- Penilee
- Pollok
- Pollokshaws
- Pollokshields
- Polmadie
- Roughmussel
- Scotstoun
- Shawlands
- Simshill
- South Nitshill
- Southpark Village
- Strathbungo
- Yoker
- East Renfrewshire
- Barrhead
- Busby (partly in Lanarkshire)
- Clarkston
- Eaglesham
- Giffnock
- Hurlet (part in Glasgow)
- Muirend (mostly in Glasgow)
- Neilston
- Netherlee
- Newton Mearns
- Uplawmoor
- Waterfoot
- Renfrewshire
- Bishopton
- Bridge of Weir
- Clippens (no longer exists)
- Crosslee
- Elderslie
- Erskine
- Houston
- Howwood
- Inchinnan
- Inkerman (no longer exists)
- Johnstone
- Kilbarchan
- Linwood
- Lochwinnoch
- Milliken Park
- Paisley
- Ranfurly
- Renfrew
- Inverclyde
- Bogston
- Greenock
- Gourock
- Inverkip
- Kilmacolm
- Langbank
- Mid Auchinleck
- Port Glasgow
- Quarrier's Village
- Wemyss Bay
- Woodhall

== See also ==
- Lord Lieutenant of Renfrewshire
- Inverclyde
- Renfrewshire
- East Renfrewshire
