= Gryffe High School =

Coordinates: 55.8650°N 4.5542°W

Location
- Old Bridge of Weir Road; Houston, Renfrewshire, PA6 7EB; United Kingdom

Information
- Type: Secondary school
- Religious affiliation: Non-denominational
- Established: 4 June 1980
- Local authority: Renfrewshire Council
- Headteacher: Kevin Christie
- Enrolment: 943
- Website: http://www.gryffehigh.co.uk/

Gryffe High School is a comprehensive state secondary school in Houston, Renfrewshire. Founded in 1980 and subsequently expanded, the school had a roll of 943 pupils in November 2019.

== Background ==
The school was opened in 1980 to serve the villages of Bridge of Weir, Houston and their surroundings. It was extended in 2000. The school has two associated primary schools, Bridge of Weir Primary School and Houston Primary School.

Gryffe High School ranked in eighth place in the 2019 Sunday Times school league tables of state secondaries in Scotland, with 70 per cent of pupils receiving five Higher examination passes. It has frequently featured in the top ten of national league tables.

Since 2010/11, Gryffe High School has consistently received the most placing requests in Renfrewshire from prospective pupils outside of its catchment area. At November 2019, its first year intake was capped at 165 pupils and its total roll was 943.

In November 2020, the school was named The Sunday Times Scottish State Secondary School of the Year. In 2021, it was ranked as having the second best SQA Higher examination results among state schools in Scotland.
