= Gryffe Reservoirs =

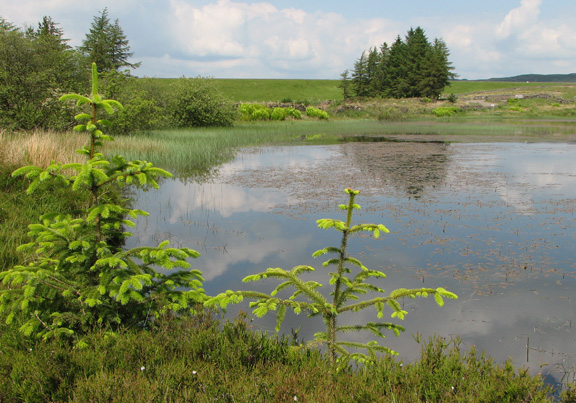

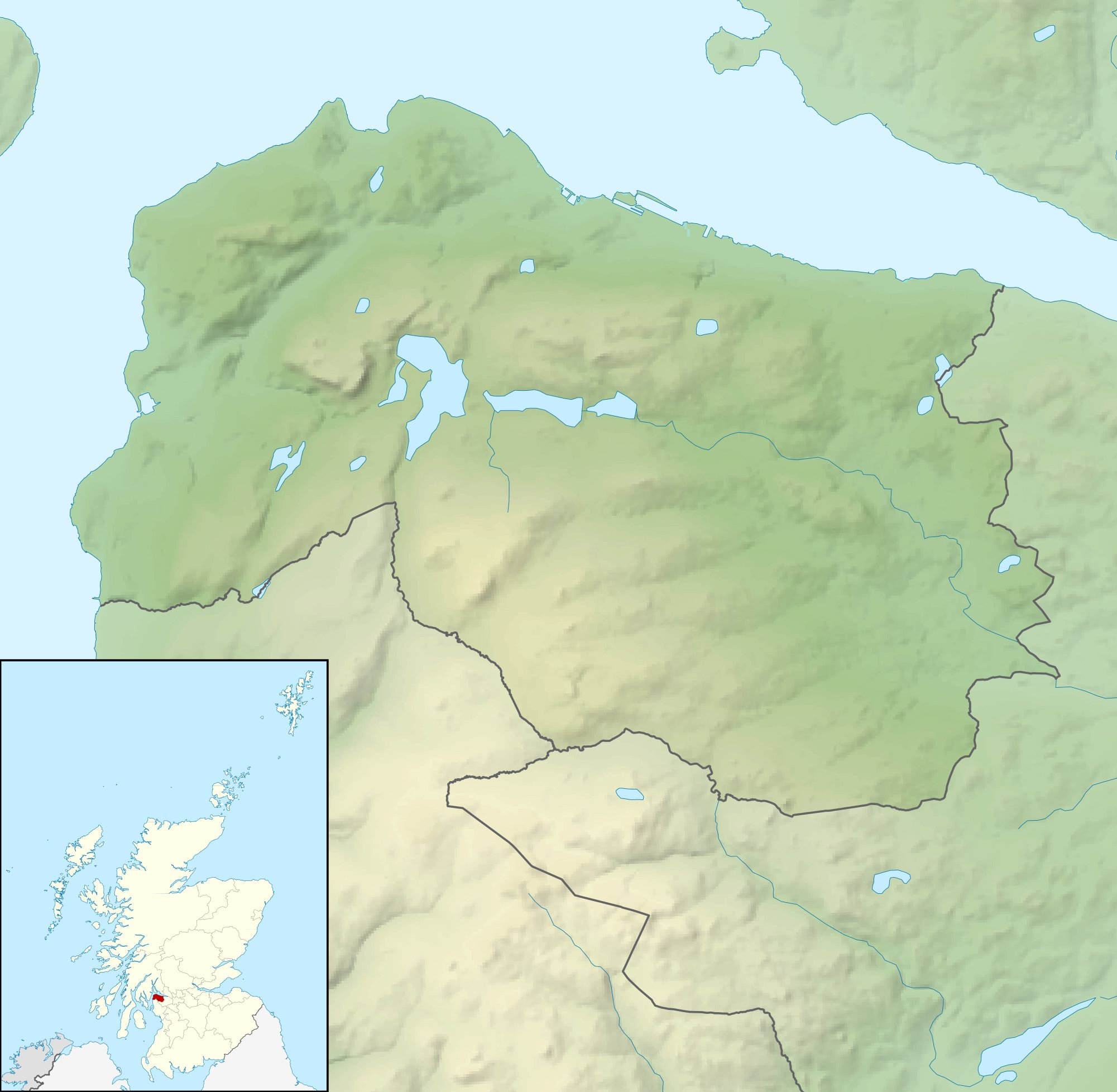
- Location within Inverclyde
- Location: Inverclyde, Scotland, UK
- Coordinates: 55.90772°N 4.74677°W
- Type: reservoir
- Primary outflows: Gryffe Water
- Basin countries: United Kingdom

The Gryffe Reservoirs, also spelled 'Gryfe', take their name from the River Gryffe, name deriving from the Gaelic garbh meaning "rough stream". are two reservoirs, known as Gryffe No. 1 and Gryffe No. 2, located in Inverclyde in the west central Lowlands of Scotland.

== Description ==
The larger reservoir, Gryffe No. 1, is adjacent to Loch Thom with Gryffe No. 2 connecting immediately to the east. Together, they are occasionally known as Loch Gryffe. Both reservoirs are impounded by earthwork dams, No.1 has a surface area of 63.9 hectares (158 acres) and No.2's area is 28.8 hectares (71 acres). The average depth of Gryffe No.2 is 5.2 metres (17 ft), the deepest point being near the wall of the dam where it is 10.4 metres (34 ft).

The reservoirs are fed from a stream rising on Creuch Hill. Their outflow, the Gryffe Water flows east into the valley of Strath Gryffe, joins with the Green Water to form the River Gryffe near Kilmacolm.

== History ==
The Gryffe Reservoirs were constructed following an Act of Parliament in 1866 to improve the drinking water supply for the town of Greenock and its environs, the impetus for this was a typhus epidemic in 1864 that had resulted in the deaths of thousands of people in Greenock. Construction of the Gryffe Reservoir was completed in 1872 and it is still primarily used to provide Greenock with drinking water. The water is conveyed to Greenock in a tunnel, the route of which is marked with air shafts, which ends at the Whinhill Water Treatment Works. The reservoirs were originally run by the Greenock Water Trust but are now owned and managed by Scottish Water.

== Fishing ==
There are fisheries on both reservoirs. One the lower reservoir, Gryfe No2. Fishing is only allowed from the bank and the water is stocked with farmed brown trout which are larger than the wild brown trout which can also be found in the loch. On the upper reservoir, Gryfe No1, fishing is controlled by the Dunrod Angling Club. The water has a head of natural brown trout which is occasionally supplemented by stocking.

== See also ==
- List of reservoirs and dams in the United Kingdom
