= Crosslee =

Coordinates: 55.860526°N 4.540529°W

- Location within Renfrewshire
- Population: Included in statistics for Houston
- OS grid reference: NS408660
- Civil parish: Houston and Killellan
- Council area: Renfrewshire
- Lieutenancy area: Renfrewshire
- Country: Scotland
- Sovereign state: United Kingdom
- Post town: JOHNSTONE
- Postcode district: PA6
- Dialling code: 01505
- Police: Scotland
- Fire: Scottish
- Ambulance: Scottish
- UK Parliament: Paisley and Renfrewshire North
- Scottish Parliament: Renfrewshire North and West

Crosslee is a small village lying on the bank of the River Gryffe in the civil parish of Houston and Killellan, Renfrewshire, in Scotland. It lies around half a mile south of the old village centre of Houston and immediately west of Craigends, although residential development has removed any significant open space between the three.

The village itself is largely composed of private housing and exists chiefly as a dormitory settlement. There is one public house and a small public park.

== History ==
Crosslee developed as a small community around a cotton mill, which opened in late 1700s. The factory was later developed and operated by R&T Jack who manufactured thread on the site. During the World War I their major customer was Nobel and the factory converted to producing “gun cotton” for the war effort. After the war the factory was rebuilt with the original stone building being replaced by a concrete structure in the 1920s.

The factory was eventually sold to Nobel Explosives (who became ICI) in 1926. They operated it till it was sold to TH Lawson in 1959 where the company traded as Lawtex and they manufactured umbrellas. It was demolished in 1985. An existing mill building, which still exists beside the river, has been redeveloped to provide office space.

== Governance ==
Crosslee is part of Ward 9 (Houston, Crosslee and Linwood) for local authority elections to Renfrewshire Council, a four-councillor ward.

With the decline in the importance of the civil parish, Crosslee has found itself associated for local government purposes with Houston Community Council.
