= Registration county =

Former statistical unit in Great Britain and Ireland

A registration county is a statistical division historically used in Great Britain and Ireland for recording births, deaths, and marriages and for compiling census data, and which remains in use in Scotland for land registration purposes.

== England and Wales ==
The Births and Deaths Registration Act 1836 divided England and Wales into registration districts. The districts were not innovations, however, but were identical to the poor law unions already in existence. Unions had been formed by the grouping parishes surrounding towns in which a workhouse was situated without reference to geographical county boundaries. Many PLUs included areas in two or more civil counties.

Registration counties (also known as poor law counties) were formed by the aggregation of registration districts by reference to which county the workhouse was situated in. Accordingly, the boundaries of registration counties rarely coincided with those of the civil county. Attempts to establish a single set of county boundaries in the 1880s were unsuccessful.

The registration counties were used in the compilation of census results from 1851 to 1911.

== Ireland ==
Civil registration was introduced to Ireland in 1864, based upon the English model. Registration counties were formed for statistical purposes in a similar manner by the grouping of poor law unions. Population data for the 1871 and 1881 censuses of Ireland was published for the registration counties.

== Scotland ==
In Scotland registration districts were introduced in 1855, and registration counties were used in subsequent censuses.

34 counties are used in Scotland for land registration purposes, which is one higher than the Sasine register. The additional county, within the 34 counties, is the Sea which is used when land is being reclaimed from the ocean.

Land registration by county was introduced by the Land Registers (Scotland) Act 1868. The act provided that in future all writs relating to lands and heritages in Scotland should be recorded in "presentment books", with a different series for each county. For the purposes of the act the Barony and Regality of Glasgow and the Stewartry of Kirkcudbright were to be treated as counties. There are two paired counties that were under a single sheriff in 1868: Ross & Cromarty and Orkney & Zetland.

The 1868 legislation was replaced by the Land Registration (Scotland) Act 1979. The 1979 Act allowed for the date and areas of operation to be fixed by statutory instrument. It was brought into operation on a phased basis using the 1868 counties, starting with the County of Renfrew on 6 April 1981. The implementation was completed on 1 April 2003 when the final tranche of registration counties were operational.

Registration county	Operational from
County of Renfrew	6 April 1981
County of Dumbarton	4 October 1982
County of Lanark	3 January 1984
County of the Barony and Regality of Glasgow	30 September 1985
County of Clackmannan	1 October 1992
County of Stirling	1 April 1993
County of West Lothian	1 October 1993
County of Fife	1 April 1995
County of Aberdeen	1 April 1996
County of Kincardine	1 April 1996
County of Ayr	1 April 1997
County of Dumfries	1 April 1997
County of Kirkcudbright	1 April 1997
County of Wigtown	1 April 1997
County of Angus	1 April 1999
County of Kinross	1 April 1999
County of Perth	1 April 1999
County of Berwick	1 October 1999
County of East Lothian	1 October 1999
County of Peebles	1 October 1999
County of Roxburgh	1 October 1999
County of Selkirk	1 October 1999
County of Argyll	1 April 2000
County of Bute	1 April 2000
County of Midlothian	1 April 2001
County of Inverness	1 April 2002
County of Nairn	1 April 2002
County of Banff	1 April 2003
County of Caithness	1 April 2003
County of Moray	1 April 2003
Counties of Orkney and Zetland	1 April 2003
County of Ross and Cromarty	1 April 2003
County of Sutherland	1 April 2003

== See also ==
- Counties of Scotland
