= Houston and Killellan =

Civil parish in Renfrewshire, Scotland

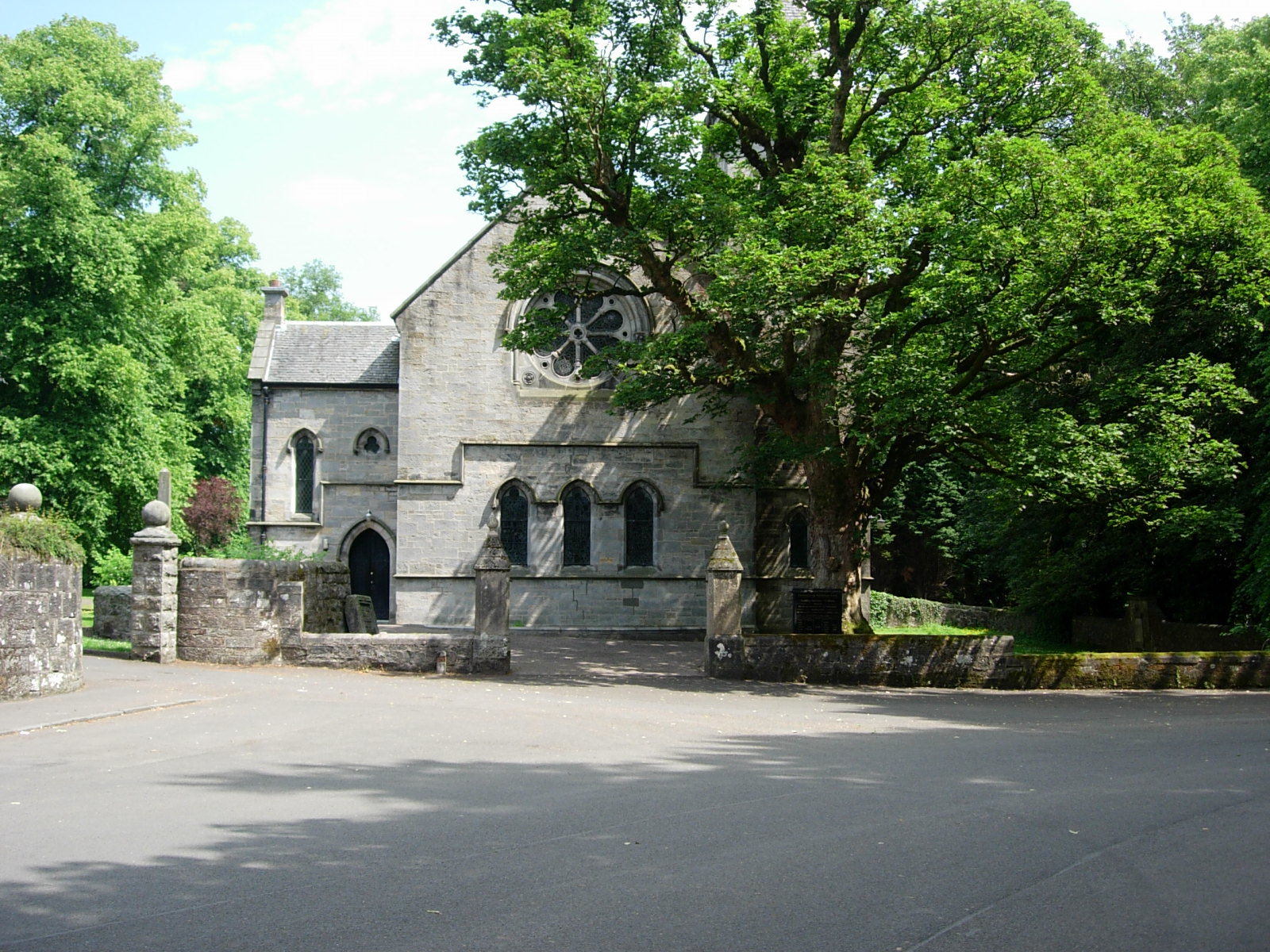
Houston and Killellan Kirk; the modern, unified parish church.

Houston and Killellan is a civil parish in the county and council area of Renfrewshire in the west central Lowlands of Scotland. It contains the villages of Houston and Crosslee, as well as a number of smaller settlements including Barochan and Killellan in its rural hinterland.

Under the name Houston, the civil parish's boundaries are similar to that of the modern community council area, the most local level of local government in Scotland. The parish is situated in the Gryffe Valley, 5 miles (9 km) north of Paisley, covering an area of 11.9 sq. miles (30.9 km^{2}) and bordering the parishes of Kilmacolm, Erskine and Kilbarchan. It also forms an ecclesiastical parish in the Church of Scotland. The parish Killellan or Killallan is subject to a number of different spellings.

== Origins ==
The ecclesiastical parish of Houston formed a union with the nearby rural parish and hamlet of Killellan in 1771, creating an effectively united parish centred upon one church in Houston. The civil parish was given existence following the Poor Law (Scotland) Act 1845, which led to the creation of parochial boards with the responsibility for administering the poor law.

== Settlements ==
=== Houston ===
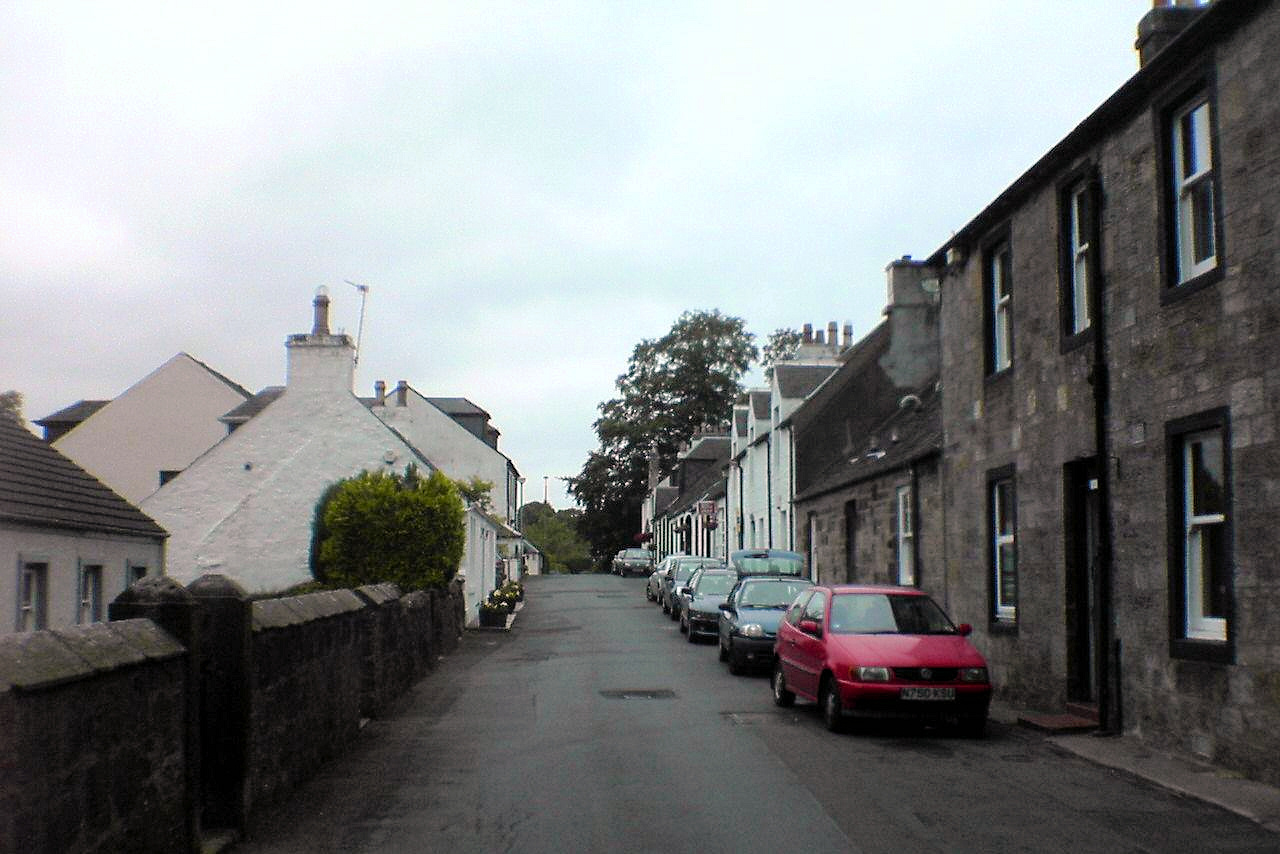
North Street, at the centre of Houston's conservation village

Houston is the main settlement of the parish and a substantial village. It also contains the residential settlement of Craigends, divided from the rest of the village by the River Gryffe to the north

=== Crosslee ===
Crosslee is a smaller village to the south-east of Houston.

=== Killellan ===
Ruins of Killellan Kirk

Killellan, whilst formerly a parish in its own right, did not have any single developed settlement. Its built environment consisted of numerous small farms with a few other enterprises such a mill and smithy, with the parish church providing a religious focus for the community.

Following the amalgamation of the Houston and Killallen parishes, the parish church - dedicated to St Fillan (Faelan of Cluain Moescna) - fell into ruin. Now a scheduled ancient monument, the remains of the church lie around four miles (6 km) from the centre of Houston on the High Road to Kilmacolm at 55.88630°N 4.58759°W together with some other buildings which remain in use. Previously within the holdings of Elderslie Estates, in 2005 the church was gifted to the Kilallan Kirk Trust, a registered charity.

The name of Killellan derives from the Scots Gaelic term for 'cell' or 'church' of Fillan as a result of the dedication of its former parish church. Killellan or Killallan is spelled somewhat differently with usage remaining inconsistent. 'Killellan' is used by both the modern Gazetteer for Scotland, the Church of Scotland and the Community Council, whilst 'Killallen' is favoured in the 18th and 19th century Statistical Accounts, 'Kilallan' in the name of the 2005-created Kilallan Kirk Trust and 'Kilellan' by Renfrewshire Council.

The old clootie and holy well of St Fillan and St Fillan's Seat are located near the old kirk at Kilallan.

=== Barochan ===
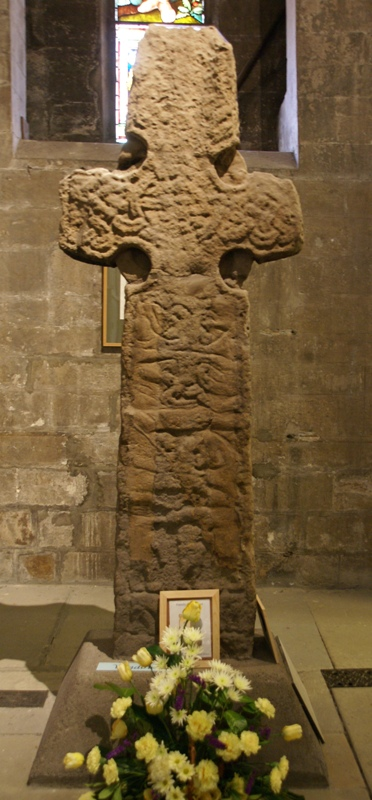
The Barochan Cross is now located in Paisley Abbey

Barochan is a hamlet and rural area to the north-east of Houston. The surrounding country contains Barochan House, a former tower house dating back to the 16th century, and Barochan Hill which was the site of a Roman fort and use for light anti-aircraft defences during the Second World War.

The hamlet surrounds the former Mill of Barochan on the Barochan Burn. Close-by was the original site of the Barochan Cross, a Celtic Christian cross possibly carved in the 8th century. It was moved a short distance in the late 19th century before being taken to Paisley Abbey for preservation.

=== Rural hinterland ===
The rural parts of the parish include a number of farms and small woodlands. The Barochan Moss lies in the east of the parish, and Haddockston House in the north. The Locher Water and the River Gryffe run through the south of the parish. A tributary of the Gryffe, Houston Burn, runs through the village of Houston.

ROF Bishopton, a Royal Ordnance Factory surrounding Dargavel House currently operated by BAE Systems, straddles the north-east boundaries of the parish.

== Government and politics ==
Houston and its parish form part of the Renfrewshire council area. For the 2007 local authority elections in Scotland, Houston was entered into a new four-councillor ward, Ward 9, alongside Crosslee and the town of Linwood (Ward 9).

With the decline of the importance of civil parishes for local government in Scotland, Houston and Killellan has found itself replaced for this purpose by the Houston Community Council area.

== Railways ==
Houston and Killellan was formerly served by two rural railway stations. Houston railway station (formerly 'Crosslee' and 'Crosslee and Houston') was situated close to the village of Brookfield outside of the parish. It closed in 1983 and the line now forms part of National Cycle Route 75.

Houston railway station was opened in 1841, and in 1926 was renamed Georgetown railway station. Originally serving the small hamlet of Georgetown which no longer exists, it went on to connect the National Filling Factory, Georgetown in the First World War and subsequently ROF Bishopton during the Second World War. At various points, it was operated as a private railway station for the staff of these facilities. It was closed in 1959.
