= Council area =

Type of administrative subdivision in Scotland

A council area is one of the areas defined in Schedule 1 of the Local Government etc. (Scotland) Act 1994 and is under the control of one of the local authorities in Scotland created by that Act.

== Legislation ==
=== Local Government (Scotland) Act 1889 ===
In Scotland, local government counties were created under the Local Government (Scotland) Act 1889. The 1889 legislation created county councils, turned each civil county (with one exception) into a contiguous area (without separate fragments) and adjusted boundaries where civil parishes straddled county boundaries, or had fragments in more than one county. The counties of Ross and Cromarty were merged to form Ross and Cromarty.[9]

=== Local Government (Scotland) Act 1973 ===
Under the Local Government (Scotland) Act 1973, local government counties, cities and their subordinate councils (including burghs and parishes) were abolished and replaced by an upper tier of regions each of which contained a number of districts except for the Western Isles, Shetland Islands and Orkney Islands where each had a single-tier authority created which exercised all the powers elsewhere split across two levels of local government. Two of the three islands authorities - Orkney and Shetland - changed their legal nature but continued with boundaries identical to the earlier counties; the Western Isles area was previously split between Inverness-shire and Ross and Cromarty.

=== Local Government etc. (Scotland) Act 1994 ===
The regions and districts were themselves abolished in 1996, under the Local Government etc. (Scotland) Act 1994, in favour of a single tier of councils. Although Scottish Councils are now unitary in nature none is officially termed a unitary authority, as in the United Kingdom that phrase is specific to English local government legislation.

One region and various of the districts created in 1975 had areas similar to those of earlier counties. Various council areas created in 1996 continued to do so with some new areas also resembling pre-1975 areas or simple divisions of them (e.g. South Lanarkshire and North Lanarkshire). Apart from their legal nature, the three islands authorities continued with their previous boundaries and most of their powers unaltered.

== Similar areas ==
Other areas which often (but not always) resemble council areas also exist for purposes of national government functions:-

- Registration counties are the areas of Scotland continuing in use for land registration purposes.
- Lieutenancy areas each of which has a Lord Lieutenant as the local representative of the monarch. Their office is for most current purposes a ceremonial function involving representation of or accompanying the monarch during official visits.

== See also ==
- Subdivisions of Scotland
- Counties of Scotland
