= River Gryfe =

Gryfe
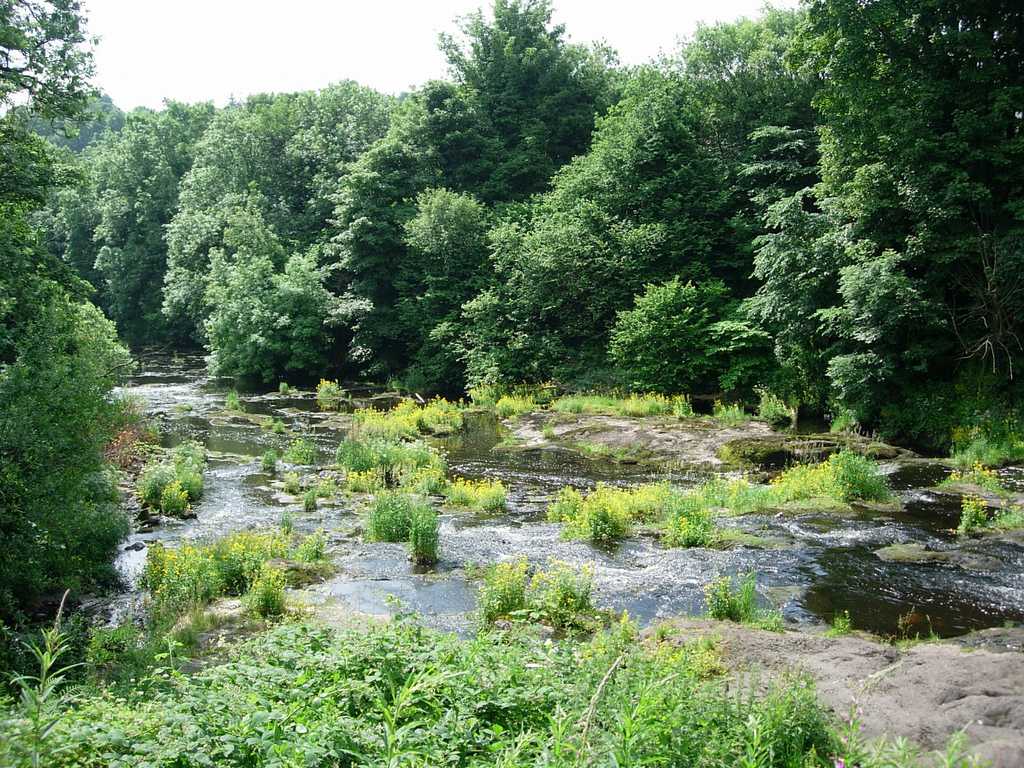
- The River Gryffe

Location
- Country: United Kingdom
- Constituent country: Scotland
- County: Renfrewshire
- Towns/villages: Kilmacolm, Quarrier's Village, Bridge of Weir, Houston, Crosslee

Physical characteristics
- Source: Gryffe Reservoir, Inverclyde
  - coordinates: 55°54′28.8″N 4°44′42″W
- Mouth: Black Cart Water, Renfrewshire
  - coordinates: 55°52′12″N 4°27′36″W
- Length: 26 km (16 mi)

The River Gryfe (or Gryffe) is a river and tributary of the Black Cart Water, running through the County of Renfrew in the west of Scotland. It gives its name to the surrounding Gryffe Valley, also known as Strathgryfe.

== Flow ==
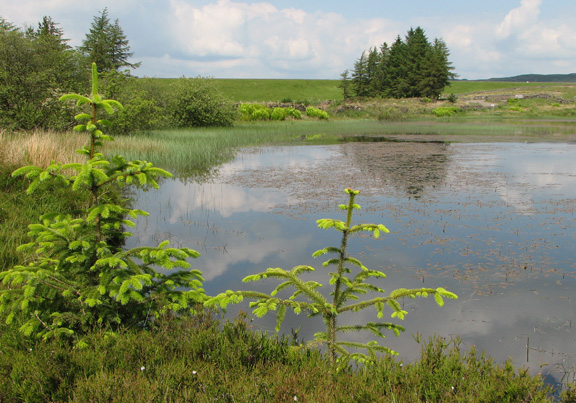
The Gryfe Reservoir

The Gryfe emerges to the south west of the village of Kilmacolm on the edge of the Duchal Woods. It is fed from a number of streams or burns on the moors above the village including the Burnbank Water, the Blacketty Water and the Mill Burn. Its main tributaries are the Green Water and the Gryfe Water, which flows through the village and begins on Little Creuch Hill to the south of Gryfe No. 1 Reservoir.

It flows for approximately 16 miles (26 kilometres) to join the Black Cart Water near Glasgow International Airport beside the M8 motorway at Blackstone Mains Farm, having passed the north side of Quarriers Village, and the villages of Bridge of Weir, Crosslee and Houston.

The Gryfe was formerly used to supply water for powering water mills at Kilmacolm and Crosslee, the latter fed via a lade (millstream) which left the River Gryfe near Bridge of Weir.

The river also supplied process water to ROF Bishopton; the water was taken near where the Linwood Moss road joins the Houston Road. The Dargavel Burn, which rises north of Kilmacolm, joins the River Gryfe near the site of the former Georgetown railway station after flowing in a south-east direction through ROF Bishopton.

== Name ==
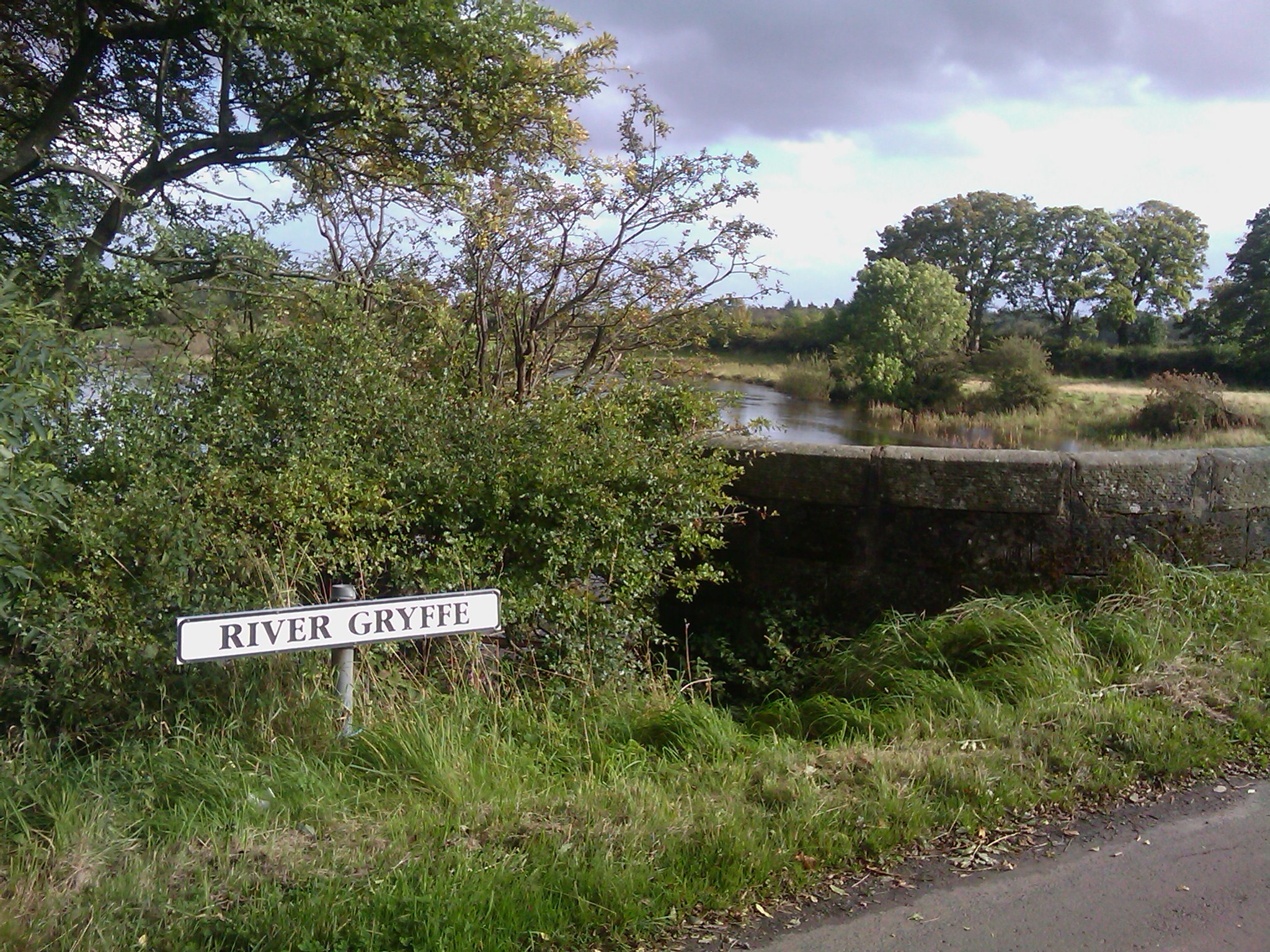
The River Gryffe signposted at Moss Road by Houston.

The name Gryfe comes from the Gaelic garbh meaning 'rough stream'. The name is variously spelt with one 'f' or two; both spellings appear in official usage.

The churches of Stragrif (Strathgryffe) are mentioned in the 1169 charter of Paisley Abbey. In 1968, Independent Labour Party politician Thomas Taylor was made a life peer as Lord Taylor of Gryfe, of Bridge of Weir in the County of Renfrew.

There are a number of places named after the river including Gryffe Road in Kilmacolm, Gryffe Avenue in Bridge of Weir and Gryffe Crescent in Paisley, Gryffe High School – a state secondary school in Houston. There are organisations which refer to the river and its environs, such as the Gryffe Valley Rotary Club. The BBC also favours the Gryffe spelling.
