= Lisle =

Lisle may refer to:

== Music ==
- Lisle (band)

== People ==
- Baron Lisle
- Viscount Lisle

Given name

- Lisle Atkinson (1940–2019), American musician
- Lisle Blackbourn (1899–1983), American football coach
- Lisle C. Carter (1925–2009), American administrator
- Lisle Ellis (born 1951), Canadian musician and composer
- Lisle Wilson (1943–2010), American actor

Surname

- Lady Alice Lisle (1617–1685), member of the English nobility
- Claude Joseph Rouget de Lisle (1760–1836), French army officer
- David Lisle, American politician
- Edward Lisle (1692–1753), English landowner and politician
- Harriet Lisle (1717–1794), English painter
- Jim Lisle, Australian rugby footballer
- Sir John Lisle (1610–1664), English lawyer and politician
- John Lisle (died 1408), English Member of Parliament
- John Lisle (died 1429), English Member of Parliament
- Sir John VI Lisle (1406–1471), English landowner, soldier, administrator, and politician
- John de Lisle (disambiguation)
- Jordan Lisle (born 1990), Australian rules football player
- Noah Lisle (born 2007), Australian racing driver
- Raymond Lisle (1910–1994), American attorney, officer in the US Foreign Service, and Dean of Brooklyn Law School
- Samuel Lisle (1683–1749), English academic and bishop
- Sel Lisle, Australian rugby league footballer
- Vanessa de Lisle, British fashion journalist

Also: surname Leconte de Lisle:

- Charles Marie René Leconte de Lisle (1818–1894), French poet

== Places ==
=== Australia ===
- Lisle, Tasmania

=== France ===
- Lisle, Dordogne
- Lisle, Loir-et-Cher
- Lisle-en-Barrois, in the Meuse département
- Lisle-en-Rigault, in the Meuse département
- Lisle-sur-Tarn, in the Tarn département
- Obsolete spelling of Lille

=== United States ===
- Lisle, Illinois
  - Lisle station
- Lisle, Missouri
- Lisle (town), New York
  - Lisle (village), New York
- Lisle Township, DuPage County, Illinois

== Other uses ==
- Lisle (textiles), a strong, durable, finely-spun, long-staple cotton that is singed
- Lisle Corporation, American manufacturer

== See also ==
- Delisle (disambiguation)
- Lyall (disambiguation)
- Lyell (disambiguation)
- Lyle (disambiguation)
