= Delisle (surname) =

Delisle or De Lisle may refer to:

- Alexandre-Maurice Delisle (1810–1880), Canadian businessman, political figure
- Arthur Delisle (1859–1936), Canadian political figure, author
- Charles-Marie-René Leconte de Lisle (1818–1894), French poet of the Parnassian movement
- Claude Delisle (1644–1720), French cartographer and royal censor, father of Guillaume (q.v.)
- Claude Joseph Rouget de Lisle (1760–1836), author of La Marseillaise, the French national anthem
- Dan Delisle (b. 1976), Canadian athlete in ice hockey
- Esther Delisle (born 1954), Canadian historian
- Georges-Isidore Delisle (1856–1920), Canadian political figure
- François Delisle (b. 1967), Canadian film producer, actor, musician
- Gilles Delisle and Helga Delisle were killed in the Delisle triple murder in 2010
- Grey DeLisle (born 1973), U.S. singer & voice actress
- Guillaume Delisle (1675–1726), French cartographer
- Guy Delisle (born 1966), Canadian comic book author
- Heather De Lisle (born 1976), American television presenter, radio correspondent
- Jacques Delisle (1935–2024), Canadian lawyer, judge
- Jean-Baptiste-Claude Delisle de Sales (1741–1816), French natural philosopher
- Jeanne-Mance Delisle (b. 1941), Canadian writer (some sources list YOB as 1939)
- Jeffrey Delisle (b. 1971), Canadian naval officer, implicated in Russian intelligence leaks
- John Delisle (1871–1940), Canadian political figure
- Jonathan Delisle (1977–2006) Canadian hockey player
- Joseph-Nicolas Delisle (1688–1768), French astronomer for whom the lunar features as well as the temperature scale below are named
- Leanda de Lisle, British writer and journalist
- Léopold Victor Delisle (1826–1910), French historian
- Louis Nelson Delisle (1885–1949), U.S. musician in jazz
- Margaret Delisle (b. 1946), Canadian political figure
- Michael Delisle (b. 1959), Canadian author
- Peter Delisle (1934–2014), English athlete in cricket
- Raymond Delisle (1943–2013), French athlete in bicycle racing
- Roseline Delisle (1952–2003), Canadian ceramic artist
- Steven Delisle (b. 1990), Canadian athlete in ice hockey
- Vanessa de Lisle, British fashion journalist
- Xavier Delisle (b. 1977), Canadian athlete in ice hockey

Several titles "de Lisle" has been held by various Englishmen, see:

- Lord Lisle (disambiguation)
- Viscount Lisle
- Viscount De L'Isle
- Baron Lisle

Latin and other iterations of the "Lisle" part of the family name, see:

- Insula
- insularem
- Isla
- Insulis
- Lille
