= Lyell =

Lyell is a surname of Scotland traced to Radulphus de Insula, 11th-century Lord of Duchal Castle. "De insula" was subsequently translated into the Old French "de l'isle" and developed into a number of variants ([de] Lyell; [de] Lisle; [de] Lyle; see below). John Lyell in 1706 emigrated to Virginia and is the progenitor of the American Lyells.

Lyell may refer to:

== People (ordered chronologically) ==
- Thomas Lyell or Lyel (1300s–1400s), Scottish clergyman
- Henry Lyell (1665–1731), Swedish-born English businessman
- Charles Lyell (botanist) (1767–1849), Scottish botanist

- Charles Lyell (1797–1875), British geologist; son of the botanist; 1st Baronet Lyell of Kinnordy
- Mary Horner Lyell (1808–1873), conchologist; wife of the geologist
- Katharine Murray Lyell (1817–1915), British botanist and author; sister-in-law of the geologist

- Leonard Lyell, 1st Baron Lyell (1850–1926), Scottish Liberal politician; son of Katharine Murray Lyell

- James Patrick Ronaldson Lyell (1871–1948), British solicitor, author, book collector, and bibliographer
- Charles Henry Lyell (1875–1918), Liberal MP; son of Leonard Lyell

- Charles Anthony Lyell, 2nd Baron Lyell (1913–1943), Victoria Cross recipient; son of Charles Henry Lyell

- Charles Lyell, 3rd Baron Lyell (1939–2017), Conservative member of the House of Lords; son of Charles Anthony Lyell

- George Lyell (1866–1951) Australian naturalist
- Maurice Lyell (1901–1975), lawyer

- Nicholas Lyell, Baron Lyell of Markyate (1938–2010), British Conservative politician at the centre of the Matrix Churchill affair, son of Maurice

== Companies ==
- Lyell Immunopharma, American biopharmaceutical company developing CAR T cell therapies

== Places ==
- Lyell Island, in Canada
- Mount Lyell (disambiguation)
- Lyell, New Zealand, a historic gold mining settlement
- Lyells, Virginia, a crossroads in Richmond County, Virginia
- A panorama of Victoria Crater, Mars, taken by the Opportunity Rover
- Lyell (lunar crater)
- Lyell (Martian crater)

== See also ==
- Delisle (disambiguation)
- Lisle (disambiguation)
- Lyall (disambiguation)
- Lyle (disambiguation)
