= Lyle =

Lyle may refer to:

== People ==
=== Surname ===
- Lyle (surname)

=== Given name ===
- Lyle (given name)

=== Titles ===
- Lord Lyle, an extinct Lordship of Parliament in the Peerage of Scotland
- Lyle baronets, three baronetcies in the Lyle family, all created in the Baronetage of the UK

== Places ==
=== United Kingdom ===
- Lyle Hill, viewpoint in Greenock, Inverclyde, Scotland

=== United States ===
- Lyle, Kansas
- Lyle, Minnesota, city in Mower County
- Lyle Township, Mower County, Minnesota
- Lyle, Washington, census-designated place in Klickitat County

== Media ==
- Lyle (film), a 2014 American drama film
- Lyle, Lyle, Crocodile, a children's book written by Bernard Waber
  - Lyle, Lyle, Crocodile (film), a 2022 film based on the book
- Lyle, a character in the 2003 film The Italian Job
- Lyle, a character in the 2004 film Napoleon Dynamite
- "Lyle the Kindly Viking", an episode of VeggieTales
- Lyle Lanley, the villain in The Simpsons episode "Marge vs. the Monorail"
- Lyle Norg, the first Invisible Kid in DC Comics

== Other uses ==
- Lyle guitars, made in Japan in the Matsumoku guitar factory
- Lyle gun, a line-throwing gun for rescue
- Lyle & Scott, a Scottish clothing brand, mainly known for their high quality knitwear
- Lyle's flying fox, a species of bat in the family Pteropodidae
- Tate & Lyle, a UK-based multinational agri-processor

== See also ==
- Lyall (disambiguation)
- Lyell (disambiguation)
- Lile (disambiguation)
- Lisle (disambiguation)
- Delisle (disambiguation)
