= Las Cruces bowling alley massacre =

1990 robbery-massacre in New Mexico, United States

- Location: 32.3102°N 106.7669°W; Las Cruces, New Mexico, US
- Date: February 10, 1990
- Attack type: Mass shooting, mass murder, robbery, arson
- Weapon: .22 caliber pistol
- Deaths: 5 (including a victim who died in 1999)
- Injuries: 2
- Perpetrator: Unknown
- No. of participants: 2
- Motive: Robbery/Unknown

The Las Cruces bowling alley massacre occurred in Las Cruces, New Mexico, United States, on February 10, 1990. Seven people were shot, five fatally, (Note: Four of the victims died on the day of the shooting and the 5th victim initially survived the shooting but died from complications due to injuries in 1999.) by two unidentified robbers at the Las Cruces Bowling Alley at 1201 East Amador Avenue. The gunmen shot the victims in an office, then set fire to a desk in the room and left the scene. The case is unsolved.

== Shooting ==
On the morning of February 10, 1990, the bowling alley's manager, 34-year-old Stephanie C. Senac, was in her office preparing to open the business with her 12-year-old daughter Melissia Repass and Melissia's 13-year-old friend Amy Houser, who were planning to supervise the alley's day care. The alley's cook, Ida Holguin, was in the kitchen when two men entered through an unlocked door. One pulled a .22 caliber pistol on Holguin and ordered her into Senac's office, where Senac, Repass, and Houser were already being held by the other gunman.

The gunmen ordered the women and children to lie down while taking approximately $4,000 to $5,000 from the bowling alley's safe. Soon after, Steve Teran, the alley's 26-year-old pin mechanic, entered. As Teran had been unable to find a babysitter for his two daughters—two-year-old Valerie Teran and six-year-old Paula Holguin (no relation to Ida)—he intended to drop them off at the alley's day care. Not seeing anyone in the alley, Teran entered Senac's office and stumbled onto the crime scene. The gunmen then shot all seven victims multiple times at point-blank range. They then set the office on fire by igniting some papers before leaving the alley.

The bowling alley fire was reported at 8:33 am. Officers responding to the call discovered that Amy Houser, Paula Holguin, and Steven Teran had died at the scene. Valerie Teran was rushed to a hospital, but declared dead on arrival. Repass, despite being shot five times, called 9-1-1 on the office phone, allowing emergency services to respond immediately and saving her life along with her mother's and Ida Holguin's. However, Senac died in August 1999 due to complications from her injuries.

Police set up ten roadblocks surrounding Las Cruces within an hour of the shooting, and carefully screened anyone leaving the city. The U.S. Customs Service, Army and Border Patrol searched the area with planes and helicopters, but no arrests were made.

== Investigation ==
The case remains unsolved, but is still under active investigation by the Las Cruces Police Department as of 2015.

In 2016, 26 years after the shooting, a brother of victim Steven Teran (who died in the shooting), Anthony Teran, was included in an issue of the Las Cruces Sun-News newspaper. One of his remarks was noted, "In this day and age, things like this don’t go unsolved. How did we not get these guys? That’s the question I ask myself every day. Numerous people saw these gunmen, so someone out there knows something, and they need to come forward."

Authorities are now trying to build a DNA profile from evidence found at the scene.

== In popular culture ==
=== Movies ===
A full-length documentary film called A Nightmare in Las Cruces was released on the 20th anniversary of the massacre. It uses actual crime scene video, pictures and interviews with family members. Filmmaker Charlie Minn hopes it will "move someone to come forward with fresh information and break the case." Since its release, more tips have been reported to the local police.

=== TV crime informational series ===
This case was featured on Unsolved Mysteries on April 25, 1990, two and a half months after the murders.

America's Most Wanted profiled the case three times: First in March 1995, second in November 2004, and third in March 2010.

== See also ==
- Lane Bryant shooting - Unsolved 2008 mass shooting at a Lane Bryant store in the Chicago area
- List of massacres in the United States
- List of unsolved murders (1980–1999)
- 1991 Austin yogurt shop murders – a similar crime
- Delisle triple murder – a solved triple murder near Las Cruces
