= Lyall (name) =

Lyall is an English given name. People with the name include:

- Lyall Brooks (born 1978), Australian actor
- Lyall Hall (1861–1935), Australian politician
- Lyall Hanson (1929–2018), Canadian politician
- Lyall Howard (1896–1955), World War I veteran, business owner, father of Australian Prime Minister John Howard
- Lyall Meyer (born 1982), South African cricket player
- Lyall Munro Jnr (born 1951), Australian Aboriginal rights activist and elder
- Lyall Munro Snr (1931–2020), Australian Aboriginal rights activist and elder
- Lyall Smith (1914–1991), American sports writer
- Lyall Watson (1939–2008), South African biologist and anthropologist

== See also ==
- Lyall (disambiguation)
- Lyall (surname)
