= Charles Lyell (disambiguation) =

Sir Charles Lyell (1797–1875) was a geologist and populariser of uniformitarianism.

Charles Lyell may also refer to:

- Charles Lyell (Liberal politician) (1875–1918), Liberal MP
- Charles Lyell, 2nd Baron Lyell (1913–1943), Victoria Cross recipient, son of the Liberal MP
- Charles Lyell, 3rd Baron Lyell (1939–2017), Conservative member of the House of Lords, son of the 2nd Baron
- Charles Lyell (botanist) (1767–1849), English botanist and translator of Dante

== See also ==
- Charles Lyall (disambiguation)
- Charles Lyle (disambiguation)
