= Lyall (surname) =

The surname "Lyall" is found early in Scotland and was derived from the Old Norse given name "Liulfr", where "ulfr" means "wolf". After the Viking settlement in Scotland, the Norse name was subject to sound changes and adapted to the local languages, ultimately resulting in the form "Lyall". The Lyall clan is a sept (a subdivision of a Scottish or Irish clan) of Clan Sinclair.

Notable people with the surname Lyall include:

- Alfred Comyn Lyall (1835–1911), British civil servant and poet
- Bill Lyall (1941–2021), Canadian politician
- Billy Lyall (1953–1989), Scottish musician with the band Pilot
- Charles James Lyall (1845–1920), English civil servant working in India
- Charles Ross Lyall (1880–1950), British career soldier and cricketer
- David Lyall (1817–1895), Scottish botanist
- Gavin Lyall (1932–2003), English author of espionage novels
- Geoffrey Lyall (born 1949), bass player for the Dead Kennedys
- George Lyall Sr. (1779–1853), Chairman of the Honourable East India Company
- Graeme Lyall (born 1942), Australian musician, composer and arranger
- James Lyall (minister) (1827–1905), Presbyterian minister in South Australia.
- James Broadwood Lyall (1838–1916), administrator in the Indian Civil Service, brother of Sir Alfred
- John Edwardes Lyall (1811–1845), British lawyer, Advocate-General of Bengal, son of George Lyall
- Laura Muntz Lyall (1860–1930), Canadian impressionist painter
- Paul Lyall (1944–2021), British para table tennis player
- Sarah Lyall (born c. 1963), American journalist in England
- William Lyall (disambiguation)

== See also ==
- Lyall (disambiguation)
- Lyall (name)
- Charles Lyell (1797–1875), British lawyer and geologist
