= Bob Howard (political scientist) =

Australian academic

- Born: 27 September 1936 (age 90); Sydney, Australia
- Education: University of New England; Australian National University
- Occupations: Associate; Department of Government and International Relations; University of Sydney; Visiting Professorial Fellow; Australian National Centre for Ocean Resources and Security; University of Wollongong
- Children: Nicholas Howard and Kim Howard
- Parent(s): Mona (née Kell) and Lyall Howard

Robert Falconer Howard (born 27 September 1936) is an Australian academic specialising in international relations, international security and Australian politics. He is a former editor of the Current Affairs Bulletin. He is a member of the executive council of the Australian Institute of International Affairs, Australia's oldest think tank, and a Fellow of the Australian National Centre for Ocean Resources and Security (ANCORS) at the University of Wollongong.

== Early life and education ==
Born Robert Falconer Howard, he is the third son of Mona, née Kell, and Lyall Howard. His parents were married in 1925 and his eldest brother, Stanley, was born in 1926 (died 2014), followed by Walter in 1929 and John (former Prime Minister of Australia) in 1939. He was raised in the Sydney suburb of Earlwood, in a Methodist family. Howard's father was a sympathiser with the New Guard. and his mother had been an office worker until her marriage. His father and his paternal grandfather, Walter Howard, were both veterans of the First AIF in World War I and in peacetime ran two Dulwich Hill petrol stations. Howard is the only member of his family to vote for the Australian Labor Party.

He was awarded a BA from the University of New England and a PhD from the Australian National University.

== Career ==
Howard is currently an associate in the Department of Government and International Relations at the University of Sydney and a Visiting Professorial Fellow at the Australian National Centre for Ocean Resources and Security at the University of Wollongong.
