= Landstuhl Regional Medical Center =

U.S. Army post and hospital in southwest Germany

- Part of U.S. Army Medical Command
- Landstuhl in Germany
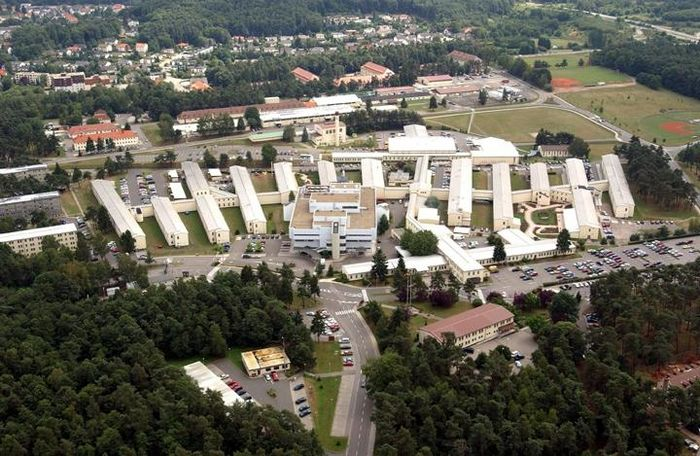
- LRMC 2008 Aerial Photo

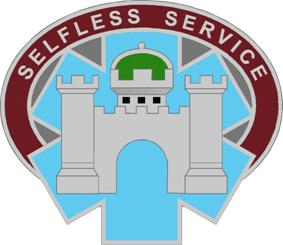
- Distinctive Unit Insignia

Site information
- Operator: U.S. Army Medical Command
- Controlled by: United States Army
- Open to the public: No
- Website: landstuhl.tricare.mil

Location
- Location in Germany
- Coordinates: 49°24′15″N 7°33′37″E

Site history
- Built: 1951–1953
- Built by: U.S. Army Corps of Engineers
- In use: 1951–present
- Events: Cold War, Global War on Terrorism

Garrison information
- Current commander: Col. Theodore R. Brown

The Landstuhl Regional Medical Center (LRMC), also known as Landstuhl Hospital, is a U.S. Army post in Landstuhl, Germany, near Ramstein Air Base. The installation is an amalgamation of Marceau Kaserne (German: Infanterie-Kaserne) and Wilson Barracks (Kirchberg-Kaserne), which were merged on October 15, 1951. As a Level II trauma center, it has 65 beds, and is the largest American hospital outside the United States. Construction is ongoing for a new hospital facility (the Rhine Ordnance Barracks Medical Center Replacement) that will replace the existing hospital. Construction is planned to be completed end 2027.

== History ==
U.S. Army Medical Command Shoulder Sleeve Insignia

Landstuhl Regional Medical Center (originally known as the Landstuhl Army Medical Center) was established on October 15, 1951. Completion of the 1,000-bed Army General Hospital building occurred on April 7, 1953. In 1980, soldiers who were injured in Operation Eagle Claw were brought to the hospital. During the 1990s, U.S. Army Europe underwent a major reorganization, and U.S. hospitals in Frankfurt, Berlin, Nuremberg, and other bases were gradually closed down, or were downsized to clinics. In 1993, a group of 288 U.S. Air Force Medical Service personnel augmented the hospital. As of June 2024, the 86th Medical Squadron continues to support U.S. Army operations at LRMC. By 2013, it was the only American military hospital left in Europe.

During the Russian Invasion of Ukraine from 2022, the hospital treated tens of wounded American volunteer veterans who participated in the fighting against Russia.

== Organ donation ==
LRMC is one of the top hospitals for organ donations in its region in Europe. Roughly half of the American military personnel who died at the hospital from combat injuries from 2005 through 2010 were organ donors. That was the first year the hospital allowed organs to be donated by military personnel who died there from wounds suffered in Iraq or Afghanistan. From 2005 to 2010, 34 donated a total of 142 organs, according to the organization German Organ Transplantation Foundation (Deutsche Stiftung Organtransplantation).

== Decorations ==
The Landstuhl Regional Medical Center has been awarded the following unit decorations:

Streamer	Award	Period of service	Reason
	Army Superior Unit Award	August 18, 1990 to April 11, 1991	For exceptionally meritorious service. (AGO 1992-06 as 2nd General Hospital)
	Meritorious Unit Commendation (Army)	September 12, 2003 to December 1, 2004	For exceptionally meritorious service. (AGO 2009-08/ AGO 2014-61)
	Army Superior Unit Award	September 11, 2001 to September 11, 2003	For exceptionally meritorious service. (AGO 2019-24)
	Army Superior Unit Award	May 1, 2014 to April 30, 2015	For exceptionally meritorious service. (AGO 2019-40)

== Honors ==
- VFW Armed Forces Award, July 23, 2012

== Notable people born at LRMC ==
- LeVar Burton (born 1957), actor, director and television host
- Jeffery Taubenberger (born 1961), virologist
- Shawn Bradley (born 1972), German-American former professional basketball player
- David Rouzer (born 1972), American Republican politician
- Rob Thomas (born 1972), American singer, songwriter and multi-instrumentalist
- Richard McElreath (born 1973), American professor of anthropology
- Heather De Lisle (born 1976), American television presenter
- Josh Wicks (born 1983), American soccer player
- John Anthony Castro (born 1986), American Republican politician

== See also ==
- Kaiserslautern Military Community
- List of United States Army installations in Germany
