= Charles Lyall =

Charles Lyall is the name of two people, both connected to British rule over India:

- Charles James Lyall (1845-1920), civil servant and Arabic scholar
- Charles Ross Lyall (1880-1950), soldier and first-class cricketer

== See also ==
- Charles Lyell (disambiguation)
- Charles Lyle (disambiguation)
