= Liles =

Liles is a surname. Notable people with the surname include:

- Alva Liles (1956–1998), American football player
- Brent Liles (1963–2007), bassist for Social Distortion from 1981 to 1984
- Andrew Liles (born 1962), UK sound artist and multi-instrumentalist.
- Buddy Liles, bass singer for the Florida Boys
- Donald H. Liles (born 1947), American professor of industrial engineering
- Frankie Liles (born 1965), American boxer
- John-Michael Liles (born 1980), American ice hockey player
- Kevin Liles (born 1968), American record executive
- Mike Liles (1945–2022), American businessman and politician
- Sonny Liles (1919–2005), American football player
- Suzie Liles (born 1956), American fiber artist
- Justin Liles (1979- ), Chief Meteorologist WDIO-TV Duluth, MN

== See also ==
- Lile (disambiguation)
