= Lile =

Lile may refer to:

- Lile (fish), a genus of fish
- Adam Lile (fl. 1907–1909), New Zealand rugby player
- Daylen Lile (born 2002), American baseball player
- Jimmy Lile (1933–1991), American knifemaker
- Robert Lile, defendant of the United States Supreme Court case McKune v. Lile
- Lile Gibbons, 21st century American politician and businesswoman
- Lile, West Virginia, United States, an unincorporated community
- LILE, ICAO airport code for Biella-Cerrione Airport, Cerrione, Italy
- LILE, large-ion lithophile elements

== See also ==
- Lyle (disambiguation)
- Liles, a surname
