= Lyle (surname) =

Lyle is a surname of Scottish origin. The name is Anglo-French, rooted in the words de isle, meaning ‘from the island’ (from Latin de insula). It is unknown which island the name refers to, but is likely either Ireland or a specific smaller island off the coast of Great Britain. The similar name "de Insula" can be traced back to at least Radulphus de Insula, 11th-century Lord of Duchal Castle.

Notable people with the surname include:

- Aaron Lyle (1759–1825), member of the US House of Representatives from Pennsylvania
- Abram Lyle (1820–1891), sugar refiner
- Adrienne Lyle (born 1985), US Olympic equestrian
- Alexander Gordon Lyle (1889–1955), US Navy dentist and Medal of Honor awardee
- Amalya Lyle Kearse (born 1937), US judge
- Amos Lyle (1866–1943), politician of Manitoba, Canada
- Bobby Lyle (born 1944), jazz pianist
- Brayden Lyle (born 1973), Australian rules footballer
- Dan Lyle (born 1970), American rugby union footballer
- Derek Lyle (born 1981), footballer with Hamilton Accies in the Scottish Premier League
- Emma Rayne Lyle (born 2003), American actress
- Ethel Hedgeman Lyle (1887–1950), founder of Alpha Kappa Alpha Sorority at Howard University
- Freddrenna Lyle, alderman of the 6th ward, in Chicago
- Graham Lyle (born 1944), Scottish singer-songwriter and guitarist of Gallagher and Lyle
- George B. Lyle, briefly mayor of Atlanta
- George Lyle (ice hockey) (born 1953), professional hockey player
- Jarrod Lyle (1981–2018), Australian professional golfer
- John E. Lyle Jr. (1910–2003), US representative from Texas
- John O. Lyle (1918–1985), British sugar industry executive
- John M. Lyle (1872–1945), Canadian architect
- Keith Lyle (born 1972), safety in the National Football League
- Lauren Lyle (born 1993), Scottish actress
- Maria Lyle (born 2000), Scottish sprinter
- Nancy Lyle (1910–1986), UM tennis player
- Pablo Lyle (born 1986), Mexican telenovela actor
- Rick Lyle (born 1971), American football defensive end
- Robert Lyle (Minnesota politician), American politician
- Ron Lyle (1941–2011), professional boxer
- Rudy Lyle (1930–1985), American bluegrass banjo player
- Sandy Lyle (born 1958), Scottish professional golfer
- Sparky Lyle (born 1944), American left-handed relief pitcher in Major League Baseball
- Stevie Lyle (born 1979), British professional ice hockey goaltender
- Thomas Ranken Lyle (1860–1944), physicist, radiologist, educator and rugby player in Australia
- Tom Lyle (1953–2019), comic book artist and penciller
- William Lyle (1871–1949), medical doctor and politician from Northern Ireland
- Willie Lyle (born 1984), Scottish professional footballer

== See also ==
- Lyle (disambiguation)
- Lyell (disambiguation)
