= Burne-Jones baronets =

Extinct baronetcy in the Baronetage of the United Kingdom

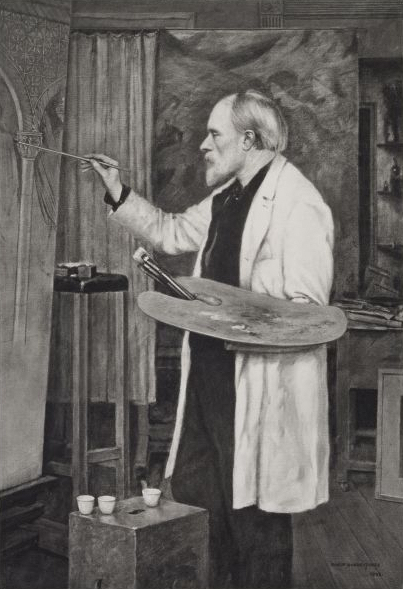
Sir Edward Burne-Jones, 1st Baronet

The Burne-Jones Baronetcy, of Rottingdean in the County of Sussex, and of The Grange in the Parish of Fulham in the County of London, was a title in the Baronetage of the United Kingdom. It was created on 4 May 1894 for the artist and designer Edward Burne-Jones. He was closely associated with the later phase of the Pre-Raphaelite movement. He was succeeded by his eldest son, the 2nd Baronet, also a painter. The title became extinct on his death in 1926.

== Burne-Jones baronets, of Rottingdean and of The Grange (1894) ==
- Sir Edward Coley Burne-Jones, 1st Baronet (1833–1898)
- Sir Philip Burne-Jones, 2nd Baronet (1861–1926)

Coat of arms of Burne-Jones of Rottingdean and of The Grange
Crest In front of fire Proper, two wings elevated and addorsed Purpure, charged with a mullet Or. Escutcheon Azure, on a bend sinister Argent between seven mullets, four in chief and three in base Or, three pairs of wings addorsed Purpure Motto Sequar et attingam

Baronetage of the United Kingdom
Preceded by Fry baronets	Burne-Jones baronets of Rottingdean and The Grange; 4 May 1894	Succeeded by Cowan baronets
