= Ronnie Kartman =

- Born: Ronald E. Kartman; Oklahoma, United States
- Genres: Country music
- Occupation: Singer
- Years active: 1970s - ?
- Labels: Celebration, Kansas City Record Company, Broadland, Phonorama, Super Productions

Ronnie Kartman is an American country singer active in the 1970s and 1980s who recorded for the Celebration, Broadland, Phonorama and Super Productions record labels. He had hits with "Strawberry Wine", "Honest Love", "You and Me Were Meant to Be" and "She's Back in Manhattan".

== Background ==
Ronnie Kartman was born in New York City. He attended the University of Oklahoma and gained a degree.

He started out in music in a group called The Fenders. For two years he did the rounds of the United States South night club circuit.

Kartman wrote the song "Strawberry Wine" which Roger Sovine of Cedarwood Publishing heard in demo form and signed into his catalogue. Radio KLPR organized a Battle of the Bands competition, held in Oklahoma. This served to convince Kartman to release that and "One Who Knows" as his first single.

== Career ==
=== 1970s ===
Kartman recorded the song "Strawberry Wine" which was released in Canada on Celebration 2052X/M. The single debuted at No. 65 on the RPM Weekly Country Playlist chart for the week of 30 December 1972.

It was reported in the 24 February 1973 issue of RPM The Programmers Weekly that Kartman's initial promotional tour to promote "One Who Knows", the flip side of "Strawberry Wine" was bringing him success. It was added to the lists of CKLB in Oshawa, CKTB in St. Catharines and CHWO in Oakville. The A side was being played at CHML in Hamilton and CHOO in Ajax, while CHSC in St. Catharines was playing both sides. Kartman was booked to appear as a solo act at the Riverside Inn at Oakville from the 19th to 28 February.

"Strawberry Wine" peaked at No. 41 on the Country Playlist chart for the week of 24 March 1973.

Kartman composed the song "Canadian Lady". It was recorded by Chambers and Mathias who were from the group Lisle. It was released on Bronco Records BR 2727 in 1974. It had massive MOR airplay in Canada.

Kartman's released the single "Honest Love" bw "Dreams of Yesterday" on Kansas City Record Company KCR-1 in 1976. It peaked at No. 19 on the RPM Country Playlist for the week of 10 April.

It was reported in the 3 February 1979 issue of RPM Weekly that Kartman's new single "She's Back in Manhattan" which was released on the Kansas City Records label was seeing action. It was receiving heavy rotation at CKFH in Toronto. CKFH was the first station to pick up on the single. The single was also placed on Big Country, a syndicated program headed by Bill Anderson. Kartman had also recently appeared on the Lively Country TV show and also the Bob McLean Show which aired on CBC. It also debuted at No. 69 in the RPM Country 75 Singles chart that week.

Kartman's single, "You and Me Were Meant to Be" debuted in the RPM Country 75 Singles chart at No. 75 for the week of 14 July 1979. By 8 September the single was at No. 31. Between that date and 29 September, it had dropped down to No. 54.

=== 1980s ===
"You and Me Were Meant to Be" which had charted in Canada in 1979, debuted in the United States at No. 95 in the Cash Box Top 100 Country chart for the week of 11 April 1981.

Kartman's song "She's Back in Manhattan", which was released on Super Productions S.P. 652 peaked at No. 91 on the Cash Box Top 100 Country chart for the week of 29 August 1981.

Kartman wrote the song "California" which he recorded and released on single, Phonorama 561. It received a positive review by Robert K. Oermann in the June 1984 issue of Music Row.
