= Charles Lyle =

Charles Lyle may refer to:

- (Charles Ernest) Leonard Lyle, 1st Baron Lyle of Westbourne (1882–1954), British Conservative Party politician
- Charles Lyle, 2nd Baron Lyle of Westbourne (1905–1976), see Baron Lyle of Westbourne

== See also ==
- Charles Lyell (disambiguation)
- Charles Lyall (disambiguation)
