= Baron Lyell =

Extinct barony in the Peerage of the United Kingdom

- Coat of arms of the Barons Lyell
- Creation date: 1914
- Status: extinct
- Extinction date: 2017
- Motto: Forti non Ignavo, To the brave, not to the dastardly
- Arms: Or a cross parted and fretty azure between four crosses patée gules, all within a bordure of the last
- Crest: Upon a rock a dexter cubit arm erect in armour proper, charged with a cross parted and fretty gules, the hand grasping a sword in bend sinister also proper

Baron Lyell, of Kinnordy in the County of Forfar, was a title in the Peerage of the United Kingdom. It was created in 1914 for the Scottish Liberal politician Sir Leonard Lyell, 1st Baronet. He had already been created a baronet, of Kinnordy in the County of Forfar, on 24 January 1894. As his son Charles, a Liberal Member of Parliament, died on 18 October 1918 of pneumonia while serving as Assistant Military Attaché to the USA, he was succeeded by his grandson, Captain Charles Lyell, the second Baron. Captain Lyell was posthumously awarded the Victoria Cross for his actions in the Tunisian Campaign during the Second World War.

He was succeeded in the titles by his son, the third Baron, in 1943. He was one of the ninety elected hereditary peers that remain in the House of Lords after the passing of the House of Lords Act 1999, and sat on the Conservative benches. The titles became extinct on his death in 2017.

== Barons Lyell (1914) ==
- Leonard Lyell, 1st Baron Lyell (1850–1926)
- Charles Anthony Lyell, 2nd Baron Lyell (1913–1943)
- Charles Lyell, 3rd Baron Lyell (1939–2017)

== Extended family ==
The 1st Baron Lyell was the nephew of the geologist Sir Charles Lyell, 1st and last Baronet, of Kinnordy of the first creation.

Baronetage of the United Kingdom
| Preceded by Gilbey baronets | Lyell baronets of Kinordy; 24 January 1894 | Succeeded by Fry baronets |
