= Lyle guitars =

Lyle guitars were made in Japan between 1960 and the late 1970s in the Matsumoku guitar factory, which also produced Univox, Arai, Aria and other guitar brands. Some Lyle guitars were made in Korea, including the C-600 classical model.

== History ==
Lyle guitars were distributed in the US solely by the L. D. Heater Music Company of Beaverton, Oregon, USA. It has been suggested that "the Matsumoku Company manufactured many Lyle branded guitars in Japan from (approximately) 1965 to 1972 until they were bought and shut down by Norlin Corporation, Gibson's parent company at the time". In fact, Norlin never purchased Matsumoku, nor did they shut them down. This rumor stems from a Gibson (Norlin) lawsuit against manufacturers (specifically Elger the parent company of Ibanez) copying their copyrighted "Open Book" headstock design. The guitars distributed by the L. D. Heater Music Company were not part of the lawsuit. Matsumoku continued to manufacture instruments beyond 1972. L. D. Heater Music Company was owned by Norlin. Matsumoku, as a sub-contractor of Aria (Arai and Company) manufactured instruments including Gibson Epiphone, Skylark, Cutler, Aria, Aria Pro, Aria Diamond and Washburn from 1964 into the mid '80s.

=== About the "Lawsuit" ===
It is a common misconception that the famous Gibson/Norlin lawsuit was filed against a number of Japanese companies. It is also commonly said it was over the exact copying of American designs. Neither is true. The lawsuit was filed In 1977 by Norlin (Gibson's parent company) against Elger/Hoshino (Ibanez's American division) over the use of the "open book" headstock design which Norlin claimed as a Gibson Trademark. It was not over the exact copying of body dimensions or construction. These guitars were metric and not an "exact" copy. The lawsuit was not "won" by Norlin, but settled out of court. Most of the Japanese companies, as a precautionary move, turned away from close copies but many still offered their "version" of the classic American designs with at least minor departures in design and appearance. Often the term "lawsuit guitar" is used to raise the price of the copy, increase interest, or they have misunderstood what the "lawsuit" was all about. Too often it really isn't a lawsuit model at all. There appears to be a lot of this in on-line auctions and on-line guitar advertisements. Guitars can have an inflated price and sell for more than they are actually worth. Caveat emptor: because the ad states it is a "lawsuit" model, does not mean that it is.

== L. D. Heater Music Company ==
The history of Alembic instruments of Santa Rosa, California, shines some light on the history and business model of the L. D. Heater Music Company.

1973 A small music distribution company in Beaverton, Oregon, L. D. Heater Music Company, read the article (about Pro Audio Gear) in Rolling Stone and it interested them enough to take a little trip to San Francisco. They wanted to discuss the possibility of Alembic making a more standardized form of instrument that they could distribute to their dealers. L. D. Heater Music was owned by Norlin Inc.. Norlin was based in Illinois and owned Gibson, Maestro, Epiphone and other music related companies. We negotiated an exclusive distribution agreement for a limited time. They gave me the purchase order I required, and this was the beginning of the manufacturing of a standard high end instrument for Alembic and the entire music industry.
