= Fry baronets of Woodburn (1894) =

Escutcheon of the Fry baronets of Woodburn

The Fry baronetcy, of Woodburn in the parish of Blackwell in the County of Durham, was created in the Baronetage of the United Kingdom on 6 February 1894 for the businessman and politician Theodore Fry. He was a member of the Fry family of Bristol.

The 3rd baronet married writer Sheila Kaye-Smith. The title became extinct on the death of the 5th Baronet in 1987.

== Fry baronets, of Woodburn (1894) ==
- Sir Theodore Fry, 1st Baronet (1836–1912)
- Sir John Pease Fry, 2nd Baronet (1864–1957)
- Sir Theodore Penrose Fry, 3rd Baronet (1892–1971)
- Sir John Nicholas Pease Fry, 4th Baronet (1897–1985)
- Sir Francis Wilfrid Fry, 5th Baronet (1904–1987)

== Notes ==
Baronetage of the United Kingdom
Preceded by Lyell baronets	Fry baronets of Woodburn; 6 February 1894	Succeeded by Burne-Jones baronets
