= Delisle triple murder =

2010 gun slaying in New Mexico, United States

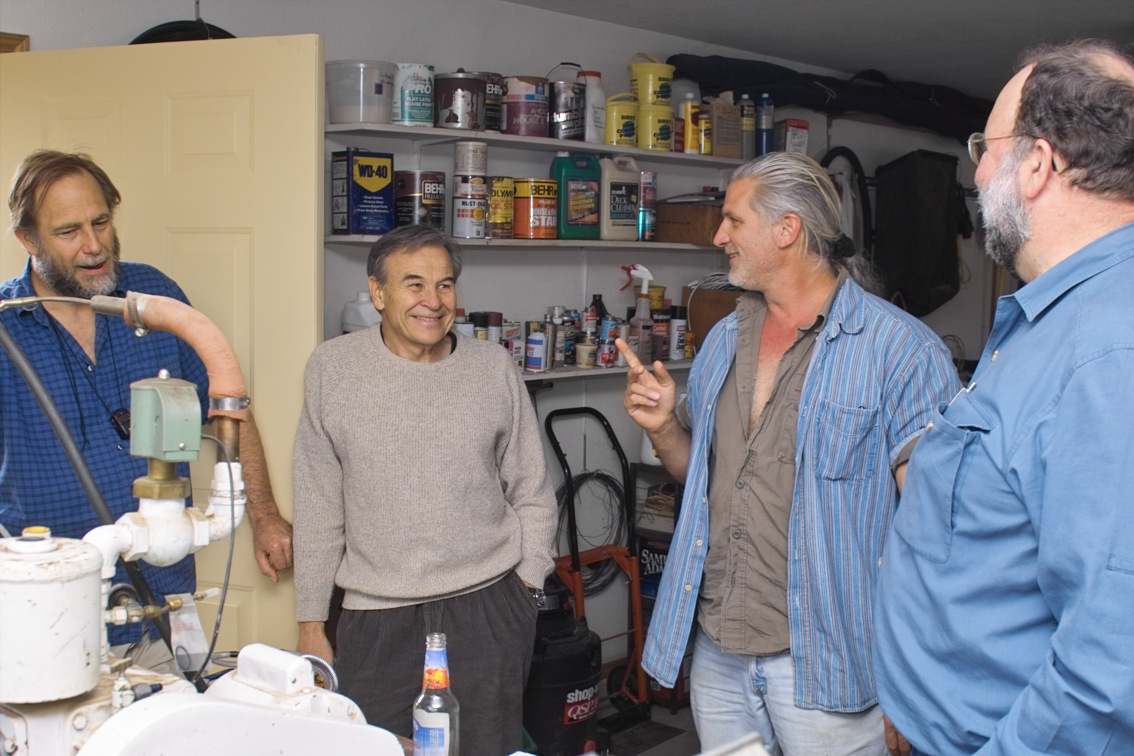
Gilles (Gil) Delisle (second from left), in 2005 with friends in the garage of Larned Asprey, including his business partner Bob Asprey (far right) who died the following January

The Delisle triple murder was the April 2010 fatal shooting of Gilles L. Delisle (69), his wife Helga Harries Delisle (72), and their business partner Peter J. Weith (68), at the Delisle home on Mesilla Hills Drive outside of Mesilla, near Las Cruces, New Mexico. A $10,000 reward was offered for information leading to the shooter.

Eugene Michael "Gino" Ferri (48 in 2011) was arrested a year later, shortly after police recovered the murder weapon from a bathroom at a park along the Rio Grande in Las Cruces, following information from Ricky Huckabay, an acquaintance of Ferri who had driven him to the Delisle's home on the day of the murders and to whom he had allegedly admitted the crime. Immediately after the murders, Ferri had allegedly met up with Huckabay, arriving in the Delisles' vehicle, and told Huckabay he had "fucked up", later adding that "it felt good." Police had initially identified Huckabay using telephone records and surveillance camera footage from a convenience store. Ferri was found guilty of the murders in May 2013 and was sentenced to three consecutive life sentences. He is currently imprisoned in the Northeast New Mexico Detention Facility.

Ferri had built the Delisle's home in 2003. He and the three he murdered had been involved in a civil dispute before the triple murder, and police had discovered the murder scene after their attorney requested a wellness check when they failed to appear at a court proceeding in the case. Ferri and his mother Carol Ferri owed the victims about $1.3 million. Weith's widow took over trying to recoup the debt from them after her husband was killed in what the Associated Press and the Las Cruces Sun-News called "the worst murder in Las Cruces in 20 years".

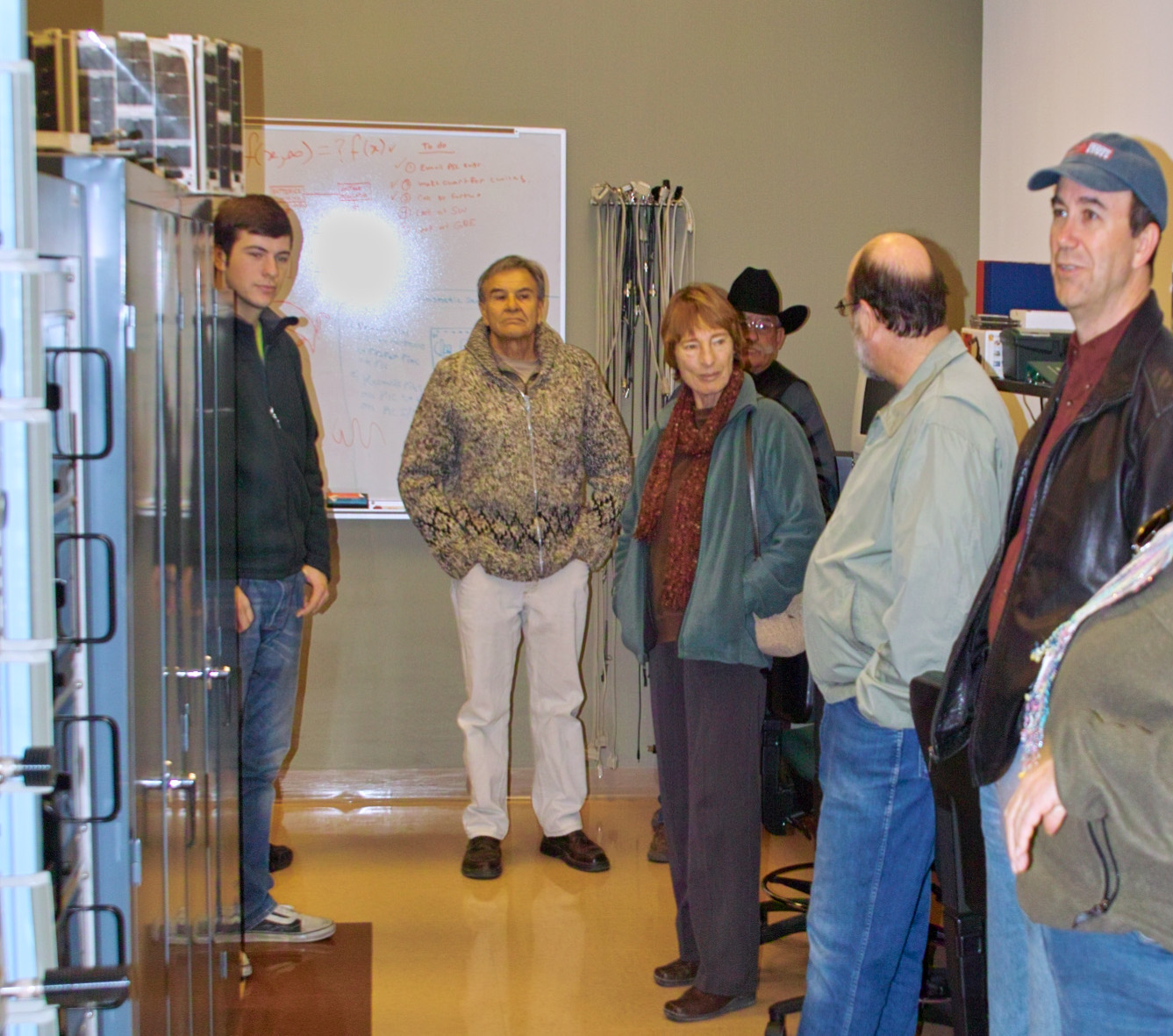
Gil and Helga Delisle (center) on a tour of the Robert "Bob" Asprey Wireless Communications Laboratory at NMSU in 2008, with Asprey's friends and relatives

Gilles Delisle was an inventor and businessman; he had received a heart transplant in 1996, from an 18-year-old girl of Artesia, New Mexico. He was well liked by many, but told friends he was in fear for his life; several of his business partners had died mysteriously.

Helga Delisle was a professor of linguistics, former head of the Department of Linguistics at New Mexico State University.

Peter Weith was the founder of the U.S. operation of the Hegla Glass Company in 1995.
