= Lisle (textiles) =

Type of finish for textiles

Lisle was originally a type of finish that was applied to obtain smooth and even yarns, largely employed for goods intended for underwear and hosiery. Yarns made with long-staple fibers such as Egyptian cotton were passed repeatedly and swiftly through gas flames. The action removed the fuzzy and protruding fibers. The finish adds smoothness, gloss, and evenness to the yarn. Most often, yarn done with a lisle finish was referred to as "Lisle yarn." or "Lisle thread." These were plied, high-twisted, gassed combed yarns of long-staple cotton.

Another method of lisle was on finishing fabrics, where hosiery fabric was treated with a dilute acid solution such as hydrochloric acid or sulfuric acid. The fabric was then tumble dried without washing at a temperature of 40° C/100° F. The acid and tumble exposure remove the loose ends and fuzziness from the fabric, which was subsequently neutralised with an alkaline solution to prevent further acid damage.

== Etymology ==
Lisle is derived from the French city Lille. It was formerly known as Lisle and served as a textile hub.

== Use ==
Lisle was originally used to manufacture underwear, hosiery, stockings, and sportswear. Today, lisle is mainly used for garments or quilting.

== See also ==
- Aesthetics (textile)
