= Leonard Lyell, 1st Baron Lyell =

Scottish Liberal politician

The Right Honourable The Lord Lyell DL
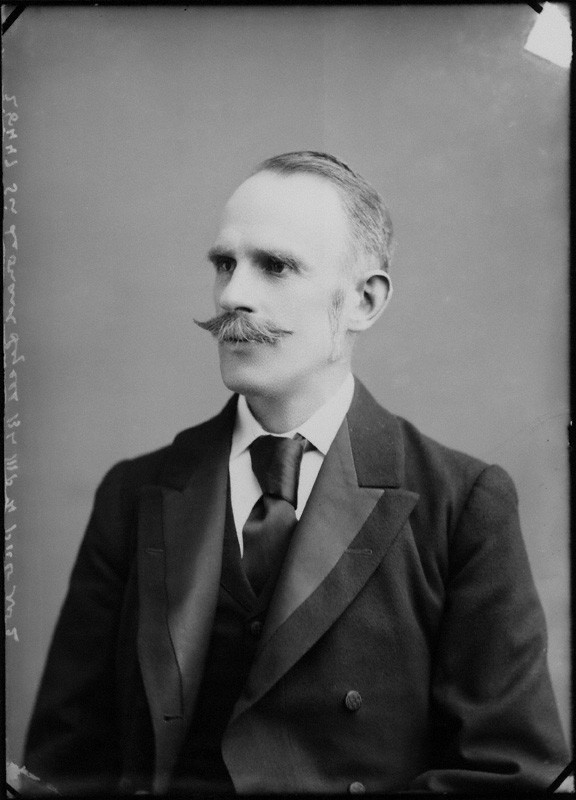
- Lyell in 1898

Member of the House of Lords Lord Temporal
- In office 8 July 1914 – 18 September 1926; Hereditary peerage
- Preceded by: Peerage created
- Succeeded by: The 2nd Baron Lyell

Member of Parliament for Orkney and Shetland
- In office 18 December 1885 – 24 October 1900
- Preceded by: Samuel Laing
- Succeeded by: Cathcart Wason

Personal details
- Born: 21 October 1850
- Died: 18 September 1926 (aged 75)
- Party: Liberal

Leonard Lyell, 1st Baron Lyell DL (21 October 1850 – 18 September 1926), was a Scottish Liberal politician.

The eldest son of Colonel Henry Lyell and Katharine Murray Lyell, he was a nephew of Sir Charles Lyell, 1st Baronet, the geologist.

He served as Liberal Member of Parliament for Orkney and Shetland from 1885 to 1900, and was commissioned a deputy lieutenant for Forfarshire in December 1901.

He was created a baronet in 1894 and raised to the peerage as Baron Lyell of Kinnordy in the County of Forfar, on 8 July 1914.

He married Mary Stirling in 1874, and had one son, Charles Henry (1875–1918) and two daughters, Mary Leonora (Nora), born 1877, and Helen (Nelly), born 1878.

His only son Charles Henry Lyell was also a Liberal MP but as he died in 1918 his son Charles Anthony Lyell succeeded to both the baronetcy and barony.

== Arms ==
Coat of arms of Baron Lyell
Crest Upon a rock a dexter cubit arm erect in armour proper, charged with a cross parted and fretty gules, the hand grasping a sword in bend sinister also proper. Escutcheon Or a cross parted and fretty azure between four crosses patée gules, all within a bordure of the last. Supporters No supporters recorded at the College of Arms Motto Forti non Ignavo (To the brave, not to the dastardly).

Parliament of the United Kingdom
Preceded by Samuel Laing	Member of Parliament for Orkney and Shetland; 1885–1900	Succeeded by Cathcart Wason
Peerage of the United Kingdom
New creation	Baron Lyell; 1914–1926	Succeeded by Charles Anthony Lyell
Baronetage of the United Kingdom
New creation	Baronet (of Kinnordy); 1894–1926	Succeeded by Charles Anthony Lyell
