= Delisle =

Delisle or De Lisle or de Lisle may refer to:

== People ==
- Delisle (surname)
- DeLisle Worrell, a former governor of the Central Bank of Barbados

== Places ==
Canada

- Delisle, Quebec, a former municipality that is now part of Alma, in RCM of Lac-Saint-Jean-Est, in administrative region of Saguenay-Lac-Saint-Jean, in Quebec
- Richmond Gulf (French: Lac Guillaume-Delisle), a waterbody in Nunavik, in administrative region of Nord-du-Québec, in Quebec, Canada
- Sector Delisle, a sector of Alma, Quebec, in Lac-Saint-Jean-Est Regional County Municipality, in administrative region of Saguenay-Lac-Saint-Jean, in Quebec
- Delisle, Saskatchewan, a town in Saskatchewan

United States

- DeLisle, Mississippi, a census-designated place
- Delisle, Ohio, an unincorporated community

The Moon

- Mons Delisle, a mountain on the moon
- Delisle (crater), a lunar crater

== Other uses ==
- Delisle scale, a temperature scale
- De Lisle carbine, a World War II silent rifle
- De Lisle College, a Roman Catholic school in Leicestershire, England
- De Lisle (novel), an 1828 novel by Elizabeth Caroline Grey

== See also ==
- Lisle (disambiguation)
