= Lord Lisle =

Lord Lisle may refer to any man who held the title:

- Baron Lisle
- Viscount Lisle
- Philip Sidney, 3rd Earl of Leicester, played a major role in the Wars of the Three Kingdoms including time as Lord Lieutenant and Commander-in-Chief of Ireland from 1646 to 1647 under the courtesy title Lord Lisle

See also

- Viscount De L'Isle
