= Lyall Howard =

Australian WWI veteran (1896–1955)

- Born: 2 May 1896; Near Maclean, New South Wales, Australia
- Died: 30 November 1955 (aged 59); Earlwood, New South Wales, Australia
- Occupations: Engineer; proprietor; military officer
- Spouse: Mona Kell (m. 1925)
- Children: 4, including Bob and John

Lyall Falconer Howard (2 May 1896 – 30 November 1955) was an Australian engineer, proprietor, and World War I veteran who was the father of the former Australian prime minister John Howard and academic Bob Howard.

== Early life ==
Lyall Falconer Howard was born near Maclean in the Clarence River region of northern New South Wales on 2 May 1896. He was the eldest of nine children born to Jane Falconer (née Jackson; 1874–1953) and Walter Herbert James Howard (1872–1948), a fitter and turner.

His hand-written war diary penned on the battlefields of the Western Front in 1916 is used by historians to retrace the experiences of Australian soldiers in World War I.

== World War I ==
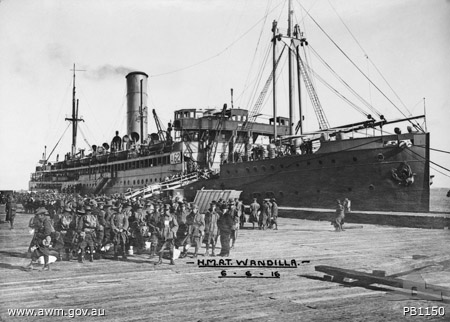
The diggers of the 3rd Pioneer Battalion prepare to board HMAT Wandilla at Port Melbourne, bound for the Western Front. 6 June 1916

During World War I, Howard was known as a proud patriot. On 16 January 1916, at age 19, he signed up to the Australian Imperial Force. As regimental number 802, he was assigned to the 3rd Pioneer Battalion, earning a wage of eight shillings per day. Records show he had attempted to sign up on a previous occasion, but was rejected because his height of 157 cm was deemed too short. Private Lyall Howard left Port Melbourne aboard the HMAT Wandilla on 6 June 1916, and was shipped to the Western Front. He was assigned to work on the roads and bridges leading into the village of Cléry, France.

In the book, The Great War, author Les Carlyon details the experiences of Howard on the front line, captured by the handwritten notes in Lyall's war diary. The entries were always brief: "Shoved in old barn", "Inoculated again", "First day in trenches". One laconic entry underscored the horrors the soldiers faced: "Will wounded and dies". Will was Howard's best friend.

Meanwhile, Howard's father, Walter, enlisted as a private in the 55th Battalion of the 5th Division and was also transferred to the battlefields of Europe. Walter's battalion was moving in for an attack on Péronne. In an extraordinary situation of chance during the mass movement of troops near Cléry, the father and son's paths crossed. Against the odds, the two met on the eve of the Battle of Mont St. Quentin in what has been described as a one-in-a-million handshake in the battle zone.

An entry in Howard's diary, dated 30 August 1918, simply reads: "Met dad at Cléry."

Lyall's son, the 25th Prime Minister of Australia, John Howard recounts: "There's just this pithy or laconic entry in the diary. It's just so Australian - 'Met dad at Clery'. They didn't verbalise their experience in the way men do now. It's one of the big changes in Aussie blokes. I think it's a good thing. They don't bottle it all up, but they did in those days."

In battle, Howard was wounded by a mustard gas attack in Passchendaele and spent 10 weeks in hospital. The gassing caused chronic bronchitis and skin rashes which would continue to plague him after the war.

When World War I ended, Howard returned to the Clarence River region in Northern New South Wales and worked as a fitter and turner for the Colonial Sugar Refining Company (CSR). The onset of the Great Depression brought hard economic times, and Lyall was retrenched.

In 1925, he married an office worker, Mona Kell. The two moved into a comfortable Californian-style bungalow at 25 William Street, Earlwood, a working class suburb of Sydney. Their first son, Walter (junior), was born in 1926, followed by Stanley (1929), Robert (Bob) (1936), and the youngest, John Howard in 1939.

== The copra trade ==
In 1926, Australian Prime Minister Billy Hughes declared that he would make "New Guinea for the returned serviceman". He offered Australian ex-servicemen land parcels in New Guinea at very generous prices. Like many other ex-servicemen, Howard took up the offer and acquired two copra plantations on Karkar Island in New Guinea valued at the time at more than £100,000 (over A$4 million in today's currency) where 200 native labourers worked.

Two Australian companies, Burns Philp and the trading house W. R. Carpenter and Co Ltd managed many of the plantations on behalf of the ex-servicemen. The companies found that it was cheaper to pay the ex-servicemen a yearly rent to lease the land rather than purchase it themselves. The controversial but legal scheme became known as "dummying", and was common at the time.

The Howard land holdings raised the attention of the Australian Administrator of New Guinea. In 1929, the Administrator sent a cable to the Investigation Branch (now known as ASIO) in Canberra:

"Walter and Lyall Falconer Howard apply consent purchase property valued at £25,000 and £100,000 respectively. Strongly suspect dummies for Carpenter and Coy. Could Investigation Branch enquire into status and financial circumstances these men and report the result urgently?"

In 1928, Commonwealth Auditor General, Sir John Latham, commissioned a report into the 'dummying' affair. Sir John concluded that, in the Howards' case, there is "no doubt whatever that dummying exists", but said "the offence is not so open and the pretence is better maintained" compared to other cases. With the assistance of Treasurer Ted Theodore, the Administrator pursued the Howard case for many more months, but eventually declared he was "satisfied with the bona fides of the Howards".

Sir John Middleton, a former PNG MP and son of returned Australian serviceman planter Max Middleton said:

"It's nothing against Howard's father because everyone was doing it", "There was no disgrace in it. Dozens of people did it".

== Later life ==
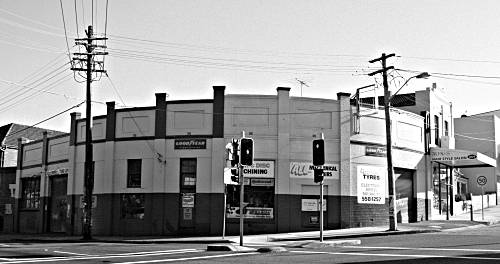
Lyall Howard's garage at Dulwich Hill, where Prime Minister John Howard worked as a boy

Howard with his father Walter owned two petrol stations where in later years John Howard worked as a boy. The first was located on the corner of Ewart Street and Wardell Road in Dulwich Hill. In 1938 they purchased a second, which they named Prince Edward Service Station, across the Cooks River on the corner of Permanent Avenue and Wardell Road in Earlwood.

By the outbreak of World War II, Howard was strongly against appeasement, and an admirer of Winston Churchill. The turmoil of the 1949 Australian coal strike and subsequent petrol rationing caused difficulties for the two Howard family petrol businesses, a dispute which ended when the army was sent in to defeat the unions. Both Lyall and Mona Howard became enthusiastic supporters of the newly created Liberal Party of Australia, and celebrated the election night of 1949 which brought Prime Minister Robert Menzies to power, defeating the Labor government of Ben Chifley. When the election results were declared, Lyall built a bonfire in the backyard to burn his petrol rationing card. He later became a paid-up member of the Liberal Party.

According to a Sydney Morning Herald report published on 7 January 1989, there were some suspicions in the Howard family that Howard was a member of the New Guard, a fascist paramilitary organisation active in the 1930s which stood for "unswerving loyalty to the Throne; all for the British Empire; sane and honourable government throughout Australia; suppression of any disloyal and immoral elements in government, industrial and social circles; abolition of machine politics, and maintenance of the full liberty of the individual." Howard's son Walter Howard disputes the claim. However, when interviewed by author Peter van Onselen about his father's involvement in the New Guard, another son, Bob, an academic and a member of the Australian Labor Party recalls Howard defending New Guard activities, and said his father probably was a member of the New Guard.

Howard never recovered from the gassing on the battlefields of World War I. He died of chronic bronchitis in 1955, at the age of 59. John Howard, who was age 16 at the time, remembers: "You never think at that age that your father was going to die. I'd always hoped that my father would be proud of me ... My mother lived to see me become treasurer and go into politics, came to my first Budget, had dinner at The Lodge. My dad, my dad didn't, unfortunately."
