= Mount Lyall =

Mount Lyall may refer to:

- Mount Lyall (Canadian Rockies), at the border of British Columbia and Alberta, in Canada
- Mount Lyall (Quebec), mountain in Gaspésie, Quebec, Canada
- Mount Lyall (Kerguelen), mountain in the French Southern and Antarctic Lands
