= Harriet Lisle =

British artist (1717–1794)

Harriet Lisle (c. 1717–1794) was an English painter.

== Biography ==
Lisle was born in Crux Easton, the youngest of nine daughters of barrister and agricultural writer Edward Lisle (c.1665–1722) and his wife, Mary Lisle (née Phillipps, 1676–c.1750), daughter of Sir Ambrose Phillipps of Garendon, Leicestershire. She also had eleven brothers including Edward Lisle MP in addition to her sisters.

A number of her pastels were recorded by writers during her lifetime, mostly copies after ancestral portraits. Of these, at least three are still known to exist, one at Walton House and a pendant pair at Highclere Castle. She is also said to have painted portraits on some of the trees on her property, in such a fashion that the people depicted appeared to be part of the trees themselves.

Lisle and her sisters also created a shell grotto at their house that was celebrated in verse by Alexander Pope and Nicholas Herbert, as well as by their brother Thomas Lisle. William Hoare has been suggested as an influence on her style.

She died in 1794.
