= Roseline Delisle =

Canadian ceramic artist

- Born: 1952; Rimouski, Quebec, Canada
- Died: November 12, 2003 (aged 50–51); Santa Monica, California
- Known for: ceramics
- Spouse: Bruce Cohen

Roseline Delisle (1952 – November 12, 2003) was a Canadian ceramic artist.

== Personal history ==
Delisle was born in 1952 in Rimouski, Quebec. She was married to painter Bruce Cohen and they had one daughter. Delisle died of ovarian cancer in 2003 in Santa Monica, California.

== Artistic career ==
She attended the Institute of Applied Arts in Montreal, Quebec, in 1969. After graduating in 1973, Delisle worked as an apprentice under Enid Legros-Wise until 1977. In 1978, she moved to the United States where started her first solo studio in Venice, California. Delisle resided and maintained a studio practice in Santa Monica, California, Delisle was known in the ceramics community for her large-scale vessel forms, wheel thrown in sections and banded with colored slips. Her older works were constructed from porcelain thrown sections fused together in the kiln, however her more contemporary works are created from earthenware, and threaded on a metal rod, secured to a weighted base for stability.

Her work is included in the collection of the Musée national des beaux-arts du Québec, the Los Angeles County Museum of Art, and the Metropolitan Museum of Art.

== Exhibitions ==
- Contemporary Ceramics: Nine Artists, Frank Lloyd Gallery, Santa Monica, California, June 2000
- Color and Fire: Defining Moments in Studio Ceramics 1950-2000, Los Angeles County Museum of Art, 2000

== Bibliography ==
Smith, Penny, Rosaline Delisle, Like A Dancer in Ceramics: Art and Perception, no. 22, 2001, pp 26–32
