= L. D. Heater Music Company =

The L.D. Heater Music Company was a US musical instrument company in Portland, Oregon. The family-owned firm operated from 1918 to 1984 and focused on importing a range of instruments, specializing in guitars, violins, and brass instruments. The company was closed in 1986.
