= Donald H. Liles =

- Born: 14 February 1947
- Died: 7 January 2022
- Education: University of Texas at Arlington
- Known for: Enterprise Engineering
- Scientific career
- Fields: Industrial Engineering
- Doctoral advisor: G. T. Stevens

Donald H. (Don) Liles (born February 14, 1947) was an American engineer, Professor of Industrial Engineering at the University of Texas at Arlington, known for his seminal work on enterprise engineering.

== Biography ==
Liles studied engineering at the University of Texas at Arlington, where he received his BS in 1970, his MS in 1974 and his PhD in 1978 all in industrial engineering.

Liles has spent his academic career at the University of Texas at Arlington, starting in 1979 as assistant professor and later associate professor. From 1989 to 1998 he was also associate director at the Automation and Robotics Research Institute. From 1998 to 2012 he was professor of industrial engineering, and chair of the IMSE Department at the University of Texas at Arlington.

Liles has been executive council member of the Texas Manufacturing Assistance Center, and member of the National Honor Society for Industrial Engineering.

== Publications ==
Liles authored and co-authored several books and articles. Books:

- With Somerville, Rob; Hulsey, Gary (1990). "Machine vision-based control of the abrasive waterjet process". Dearborn, Mich.: Society of Manufacturing Engineers.
- With Kamrani, Ali K.; Parsaei, H. R. (1995). "Planning, design, and analysis of cellular manufacturing systems". Amsterdam; New York: Elsevier.

Articles, a selection:

- With Ayoub, M. M.; Selan, Joseph L. (1983). "An ergonomics approach for the design of manual materials-handling tasks". Human Factors: The Journal of the Human Factors and Ergonomics Society. 25 (5): 507–515. doi:10.1177/001872088302500505. PMID 6667940. S2CID 31662533.
- With Johnson, Mary E.; Meade, Laura (1995). "Enterprise engineering: a discipline?". Society for Enterprise Engineering Conference Proceedings. 6. CiteSeerX 10.1.1.196.4337.
- With Presley, Adrien R. (1996). Enterprise modeling within an enterprise engineering framework (PDF). Proceedings of the 28th conference on Winter simulation. IEEE Computer Society. Archived from the original (PDF) on 2006-09-12.
