= Lisle (band) =

- Origin: Barrie, Ontario, Canada
- Genres: Rock, Country, R&B
- Years active: 1967–1974
- Labels: Bronco Records (Canada); Bell Records (USA)
- Members: Bill Chambers; Brian Mathias; Danny Stephens
- Website: www.SmileWithLisle.com

Lisle was a Canadian rock band formed in 1967 in Barrie, Ontario.

== Biography ==
Originally named 'Quantity Unknown' and 'Robin and the Hoods', the band produced one hit single in Canada in 1974: "Shelly Made Me Smile" which came from their album, Smile With Lisle (1973), on Bronco Records.

== Spin off ==
Two Lisle members, Chambers and Mathias recorded the Ronnie Kartman composition, "Canadian Lady" which was released on Bronco Records BR 2727 in 1974. It had massive MOR airplay.

== Later years ==
Chambers is currently a member of The Martels.

== Members ==
- Bill Chambers - Vocals, Guitar
- Brian Mathias - Electric Bass, Vocals
- Danny Stephens - Drummer, Vocals

== Discography ==
=== Albums ===
Year	Album
1973	Smile with Lisle

=== Singles ===
Year	Single	Chart Positions			Album
Year	Single	CAN	CAN AC	CAN Country	Album
1972	"You're Why Baby"/"Going Away"	—	31	40	Smile with Lisle
1973	"Sweetheart"	—	—	28	Smile with Lisle
1973	"Shelly Made Me Smile"	37	28	—	Smile with Lisle
