= Insula =

Insula is the Latin word for "island" and may refer to:

- Insula (Roman city), a block in a Roman city plan surrounded by four streets
- Insula (building), a kind of apartment building in ancient Rome that provided housing for all but the elite
- Ínsula Barataria, the governorship assigned to Sancho Panza as a prank in the novel Don Quixote
- Insular cortex, a brain structure
- "Insula", a 2020 song by Moses Sumney from Græ
