= Lile, West Virginia =

- Unincorporated community
- Location within West Virginia Location within the United States
- Coordinates: 38°07′37″N 80°37′11″W
- Country: United States
- State: West Virginia
- County: Greenbrier
- Elevation: 3,094 ft (943 m)
- Time zone: UTC-5 (Eastern (EST))
  - Summer (DST): UTC-4 (EDT)
- Area codes: 304 & 681
- GNIS feature ID: 1551804

Lile is an unincorporated community in Greenbrier County, West Virginia, United States. Lile is 7 miles (11 km) northeast of Quinwood.
