= David Lisle =

American politician

Member of the New Hampshire House of Representatives
- In office 2016–2018
- Succeeded by: Laura Telerski
- Constituency: Hillsborough 35

Personal details
- Party: Democratic

David Lisle is an American politician from New Hampshire. He served in the New Hampshire House of Representatives.
