= Mount Lyell =

Mount Lyell may refer to:

- Mount Lyell (California), U.S., in Yosemite National Park
- Mount Lyell (Tasmania), Australia
- Mount Lyell (Western Australia), in the Kimberley region
- Mount Lyell (Canada), on the Alberta–British Columbia boundary

== See also ==
- 1912 North Mount Lyell disaster
- Mount Lyell Mining and Railway Company, Tasmania (1897-1994)
