= Lyall =

Lyall may refer to:

- Lyall (name)
- Lyall (surname)
- Lyall Bay, a bay and a suburb in Wellington, New Zealand

== See also ==
- Mount Lyall (disambiguation)
- Lyell (disambiguation)
