= Lyle (given name) =

The given name Lyle is shared by:

== Academia ==
- Lyle Campbell (born 1942), linguist and leading expert on American Indian languages
- Lyle Craker, professor in the department of Plant, Soil and Insect Sciences at the University of Massachusetts
- Lyle H. Lanier (1903–1988), American experimental psychologist, university professor and administrator
- Lyle F. Schoenfeldt (born 1939), American business management professor
- Lyle Tuttle (1931–2019), American tattoo artist and historian

== Arts and media ==
=== Film, television, and theatre ===
- Lyle Bettger (1915–2003), character actor known most for his Hollywood roles from the 1950s
- Lyle Kessler, American playwright and screenwriter
- Lyle Owerko, filmmaker and photographer
- Lyle Reifsnider (1901–1980), set decorator who worked in Hollywood films from 1946 to 1962
- Lyle Talbot (1902–1996), American actor best known for playing Joe Randolph on The Adventures of Ozzie and Harriet
- Lyle Tayo (1889–1971), American film actress
- Lyle Waggoner (1935–2020), American actor and former model
- Lyle R. Wheeler (1905–1990), American Academy Award-winning motion picture art director

=== Music ===
- Lyle Lovett (born 1957), American singer-songwriter and actor
- Lyle Mays (1953–2020), American jazz pianist and composer
- Lyle Preslar, American musician: guitar player and songwriter for the hardcore punk band Minor Threat
- Lyle Workman, American guitarist, composer and music producer

=== Writing ===
- Lyle Kessler, American playwright and screenwriter
- Lyle Lovett (born 1957), American singer-songwriter and actor
- Lyle Munson (1918–1973), American intelligence agent and book publisher
- Lyle Neff (born 1969), poet and journalist in Vancouver, British Columbia
- Lyle Saxon (1891–1946), New Orleans journalist who reported for The Times-Picayune
- Lyle Stuart (1922–2006), American author and independent publisher of controversial books

=== Other arts ===
- Lyle Tuttle (1931–2019), American tattoo artist and historian
- Lyle Waggoner (1935–2020), American actor and former model

== Military and politics ==
=== Canada ===
- Lyle Oberg (born 1960), Albertan politician and former member of the Legislative Assembly
- Lyle Stewart (born 1951), Canadian provincial politician
- Lyle Vanclief (born 1943), PC, Canada's Minister of Agriculture from 1997 to 2003
- Lyle Wicks (1912–2004), British Columbia politician

=== United States ===
- Lyle Bien (born 1945), American vice admiral in the United States Navy
- Lyle Boren (1909–1992), Democratic member of the U.S. House of Representatives from Oklahoma
- Lyle Bouck (1923–2016), lieutenant of the I&R Platoon of the 394th Infantry Regiment of the 99th Infantry Division in World War II
- Lyle Hanson (1935–2020), American politician from North Dakota
- Lyle W. Hillyard (born 1940), American politician and attorney from Utah
- Lyle Franklin Lane (1926–2013), United States diplomat
- Lyle Larson (born 1959), American politician
- Lyle Williams (1942–2008), U.S. representative from Ohio

== Sports ==
=== American football ===
- Lyle Alzado (1949–1992), American NFL All-Pro football player
- Lyle Bennett (1903–2005), head coach of the Central Michigan college football program from 1947 to 1949
- Lyle Blackwood (born 1951), played in the National Football League with the Miami Dolphins
- Lyle Hemphill (born 1980), American football coach and former player
- Lyle Sendlein (born 1984), American football center for the Arizona Cardinals
- Lyle Smith (1916–2017), assistant coach and head coach of the Boise State college football program

=== Association football (soccer) ===
- Lyle Martin (born 1985), American soccer player for the Vancouver Whitecaps
- Lyle Taylor (born 1991), footballer
- Lyle Yorks (born 1982), retired American soccer midfielder

=== Baseball ===
- Lyle Bigbee (1893–1942), outfielder and pitcher
- Lyle Mouton (born 1969), former professional baseball player
- Lyle Overbay (born 1977), American baseball player

=== Ice hockey ===
- Lyle Bradley (1943–2022), former ice hockey center
- Lyle Odelein (1968–2026), hockey player in the National Hockey League
- Lyle Wright, (1898–1963), United States Hockey Hall of fame inductee

=== Other sports ===
- Lyle Bauer (1958–2024), Canadian football player and executive
- Lyle Beerbohm (born 1979), professional mixed martial arts fighter
- Lyle Green (born 1976), fullback for the BC Lions of the Canadian Football League

== Other fields ==
- Lyle Berman (born 1941), professional poker player and business executive
- Lyle Menendez (born 1968), convicted for the shotgun murders in 1989 of his parents in Beverly Hills, California
- Lyle Munson (1918–1973), American intelligence agent and book publisher
- Lyle Rains, senior executive at the arcade game company Atari
- Lyle M. Spencer (1911–1968), founder of Science Research Associates (SRA) and The Spencer Foundation
