= Current Affairs Bulletin =

The Current Affairs Bulletin (C.A.B.) was a fortnightly subscription magazine in Australia published by the Commonwealth Office of Education, an instrumentality of the Australian federal government. Each issue dealt with a particular issue of general interest, in a factual manner, eschewing political slant or opinions. The purpose behind the program was to encourage educated debate. The material was supplied by experts in the respective field, in plain English, printed on standard newsprint, around the size of a small paperback book but around eight pages.

== History ==
The first C.A.B.s were issued to Australian troops in the years 1942–1946, then from 1947 were supplied, post free, for 10 shillings per annum.
