= Jean-Baptiste-Claude Delisle de Sales =

French philosopher (1741–1816)

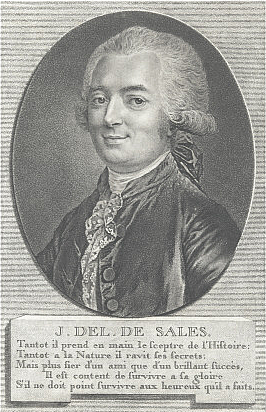
Jean-Baptiste-Claude Delisle de Sales (1741-1816)

Jean-Baptiste-Claude Delisle de Sales or Jean-Baptiste Isoard de Lisle (29 April 1741 – 22 September 1816) was a French philosopher noted for his multi-edition, multi-volume opus The Philosophy of Nature: Treatise on Human Moral Nature.

De Sales taught for the Oratorians in Riom and Nantes until 1768, when he resigned to become an independent philosopher in Paris. His book The Philosophy of Nature was first published in 1770 and expanded over the years, supposedly going through seven editions and increasing in size to up to a dozen volumes. It has been described as "long-winded and conventional", a "hodgepodge of ideas".

De Sales challenged the young Earth biblical 6,000-year-old date of creation which was popular in his day, instead believing based on astronomical data that the Earth was around 140,000 years old and that it took 40,062 years to cool down following its formation. He however rejected the three-million-year-old date of the Earth which was taught in India at the time.

Beginning in 1776, a faction in the French court began a campaign against de Sales, as a way of attacking the French philosophical movement more generally. Voltaire championed his defense, but de Sales was imprisoned in March 1777 for publishing a book deemed to be anti-royalist, an event that brought his works out of obscurity. De Sales became a supporter of the early philosophically-based stages of the French Revolution, in 1789–1792. However, by 1794, feeling the Revolution had discarded its underlying principles, he returned to royalist sympathies, and was arrested for publishing anti-Jacobin works. Unlike many, he survived his arrest and the revolution.
