= John Howard =

Prime Minister of Australia from 1996 to 2007

The Honourable John Howard OM AC SSI
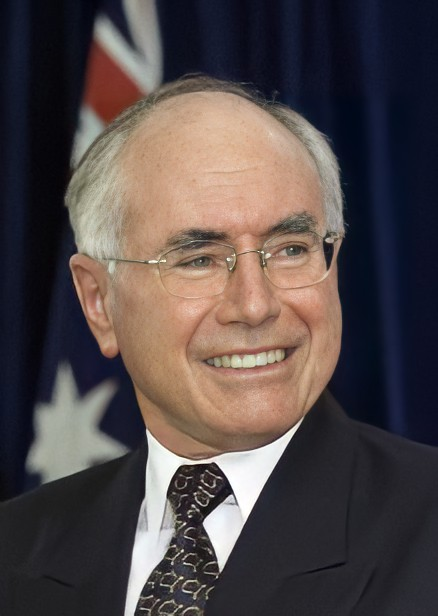
- Howard in 2001

25th Prime Minister of Australia
- In office 11 March 1996 – 3 December 2007
- Monarch: Elizabeth II
- Governors-General: William Deane; Peter Hollingworth; Michael Jeffery
- Deputy: Tim Fischer; John Anderson; Mark Vaile
- Preceded by: Paul Keating
- Succeeded by: Kevin Rudd

Leader of the Opposition
- In office 30 January 1995 – 11 March 1996
- Deputy: Peter Costello
- Preceded by: Alexander Downer
- Succeeded by: Kim Beazley
- In office 5 September 1985 – 9 May 1989
- Deputy: Neil Brown; Andrew Peacock
- Preceded by: Andrew Peacock
- Succeeded by: Andrew Peacock
Party leadership
8th Leader of the Liberal Party
In office 30 January 1995 – 29 November 2007
Deputy	Peter Costello
Preceded by	Alexander Downer
Succeeded by	Brendan Nelson
In office 5 September 1985 – 9 May 1989
Deputy	Neil Brown; Andrew Peacock
Preceded by	Andrew Peacock
Succeeded by	Andrew Peacock
Deputy Leader of the Liberal Party
In office 8 April 1982 – 5 September 1985
Leader	Malcolm Fraser; Andrew Peacock
Preceded by	Phillip Lynch
Succeeded by	Neil Brown
Ministerial offices
Manager of Opposition Business
In office 7 April 1993 – 31 January 1995
Leader	John Hewson
Preceded by	Warwick Smith
Succeeded by	Peter Reith
Treasurer of Australia
In office 19 November 1977 – 11 March 1983
Prime Minister	Malcolm Fraser
Preceded by	Phillip Lynch
Succeeded by	Paul Keating
Minister for Special Trade Negotiations
In office 17 July 1977 – 20 December 1977
Prime Minister	Malcolm Fraser
Preceded by	Position established
Succeeded by	Victor Garland
Minister for Business and Consumer Affairs
In office 22 December 1975 – 17 July 1977
Prime Minister	Malcolm Fraser
Preceded by	Sir Bob Cotton
Succeeded by	Wal Fife

Member of the Australian Parliament for Bennelong
- In office 18 May 1974 – 24 November 2007
- Preceded by: John Cramer
- Succeeded by: Maxine McKew

Chairman of the International Democrat Union
- In office 10 June 2002 – 21 November 2014
- Preceded by: William Hague
- Succeeded by: John Key

Personal details
- Born: John Winston Howard; 26 July 1939 (age 87) Earlwood, New South Wales, Australia
- Party: Liberal
- Other political affiliations: Coalition
- Spouse: Janette Howard (m. 1971)
- Children: 3
- Parents: Lyall Howard (father); Mona McKell (mother)
- Relatives: Bob Howard (brother)
- Education: Canterbury Boys' High School; University of Sydney (LLB)
- Occupation: Lawyer; Politician; Author
- John Howard's voice Howard speaking after his meeting with U.S. President Bill Clinton; Recorded 20 November 1996

John Winston Howard (born 26 July 1939) is an Australian former politician who served as the 25th prime minister of Australia from 1996 to 2007, holding office as leader of the Liberal Party of Australia. His eleven-year tenure as prime minister is the second-longest in Australian history, after that of Robert Menzies.

Howard was born in Sydney and studied law at the University of Sydney. He was a commercial lawyer before entering parliament. A former federal president of the Young Liberals, he first stood for office at the 1968 New South Wales state election, but lost narrowly. At the 1974 federal election, Howard was elected as a member of parliament (MP) for the division of Bennelong. He was promoted to cabinet in 1977, and later in the year replaced Phillip Lynch as treasurer of Australia, remaining in that position until the defeat of Malcolm Fraser's government at the 1983 election. In 1985, Howard was elected leader of the Liberal Party for the first time, thus replacing Andrew Peacock as Leader of the Opposition. He led the Liberal–National coalition to the 1987 federal election, but lost to Bob Hawke's Labor government, and was removed from the leadership in 1989. Remaining a key figure in the party, Howard was re-elected leader in 1995, replacing Alexander Downer, and subsequently led the Coalition to a landslide victory at the 1996 federal election.

In his first term, Howard introduced reformed gun laws in response to the Port Arthur massacre, and controversially implemented a nationwide value-added tax, breaking a pre-election promise. The Howard government called a snap election for October 1998, which they won, albeit with a greatly reduced majority. Going into the 2001 election, the Coalition trailed behind Labor in opinion polling. However, in a campaign dominated by national security, Howard introduced changes to Australia's immigration system to deter asylum seekers from entering the country, and pledged military assistance to the United States following the September 11 attacks. Due to this, Howard won widespread support, and his government was narrowly re-elected.

In Howard's third term in office, Australia contributed troops to the War in Afghanistan and the Iraq War, and led the International Force for East Timor. The Coalition was re-elected once more at the 2004 federal election. In his final term in office, his government introduced industrial relations reforms known as WorkChoices, which proved controversial and unpopular with the public. The Howard government was defeated at the 2007 federal election, with the Labor Party's Kevin Rudd succeeding him as prime minister. Howard also lost his own seat of Bennelong at the election to Maxine McKew, becoming only the second prime minister to do so, after Stanley Bruce at the 1929 election. Following this loss, Howard retired from politics, but has remained active in political discourse.

Howard's government presided over a sustained period of economic growth and a large "mining boom", and significantly reduced government debt by the time he left office. He was known for his broad appeal to voters across the political spectrum, and commanded a diverse base of supporters, colloquially referred to as his "battlers". Retrospectively, ratings of Howard's premiership have been polarised. His critics have admonished him for involving Australia in the Iraq War, his policies regarding asylum seekers, and his economic agenda. Nonetheless, he has been frequently ranked within the upper-tier of Australian prime ministers by political experts and the general public.

== Early life and education ==
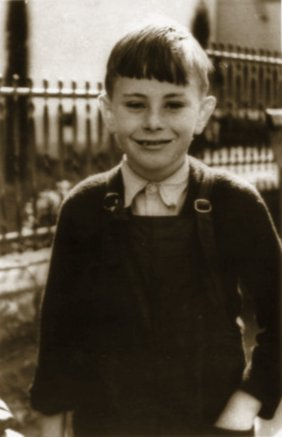
Young Howard, 1940s

John Winston Howard is the fourth son of Mona (née Kell; 1899–1983) and Lyall Howard (1896–1955), an engineer, proprietor, and World War I veteran. His older brothers were Walter (1926–2019), Stanley (1930–2014) and Bob (b. 1936). Howard's middle name "Winston" was given by his parents in honor of Prime Minister Winston Churchill. Howard's ancestors were English, Scottish, and Irish. He is descended from convict William Tooley, who was transported to New South Wales in 1816 for stealing a watch.

Howard was born and raised in the Sydney suburb of Earlwood, in a Methodist family, and was also known as "Jack" in his youth. His mother had been an office worker until her marriage, while his father and his paternal grandfather, Walter Howard, were both veterans of the First Australian Imperial Force in the First World War. They also ran two Dulwich Hill petrol stations where Howard worked as a boy. In 1955, when he 16 years old, his father died, leaving his mother to take care of him.

Howard suffered a hearing impairment in his youth, leaving him with a slight speech impediment, and he continues to wear a hearing aid. It also influenced him in subtle ways, limiting his early academic performance; encouraging a reliance on an excellent memory; and in his mind ruling out becoming a barrister as a likely career.

Howard attended Earlwood Primary School and Canterbury Boys' High School. He won a citizenship prize in his final year at Earlwood (presented by local politician Eric Willis), and subsequently represented his secondary school at debating as well as cricket and rugby union. Cricket remained a lifelong hobby. In his final year at school he took part in a radio show hosted by Jack Davey, Give It a Go, broadcast on the commercial radio station, 2GB. After gaining his Leaving Certificate, he studied law at the University of Sydney, graduating with a Bachelor of Laws degree in 1962. Howard began working for the firm of Stephen Jaques and Stephen (now Mallesons) as a junior solicitor. In 1964, he took a trip around the world, visiting Britain, Europe, Israel, India, and Singapore. After returning to Sydney in 1965, he began working for Clayton Utz, but "lacked the university grades and the social connections to be on track for a partnership". He subsequently moved to a smaller firm, which became Truman, Nelson and Howard after he was made a partner.

== Early political career ==
Howard joined the Liberal Party in 1957. He was a member of the party's New South Wales state executive and was federal president of the Young Liberals (the party youth organisation) from 1962 to 1964. Howard supported Australia's involvement in the Vietnam War, although has since said there were "aspects of it that could have been handled and explained differently".

At the 1963 federal election, Howard acted as campaign manager for Tom Hughes in his local seat of Parkes. Hughes went on to defeat the 20-year Labor incumbent, Les Haylen. In mid-1964, Howard travelled to London to work and travel for a period. He volunteered for the Conservative Party in the electorate of Holborn and St Pancras South at the 1964 UK general election. In 1967, with the support of party power brokers John Carrick and Eric Willis, Howard was endorsed as candidate for the marginal suburban state seat of Drummoyne, held by Labor's Reg Coady. Howard's mother sold the family home in Earlwood and rented a house with him at Five Dock, a suburb within the electorate. At the election in February 1968, in which the incumbent state Liberal government was returned to office, Howard narrowly lost to Coady, despite campaigning vigorously.

At the 1974 federal election, Howard successfully contested the Division of Bennelong, located in suburban Sydney. The election saw the return of the Gough Whitlam-led Labor government. Howard supported Malcolm Fraser for the leadership of the Liberal Party against Billy Snedden following the 1974 election. When Fraser won office at the 1975 federal election, Howard was appointed Minister for Business and Consumer Affairs, a position in which he served until 1977. At this stage, he followed the protectionist and pro-regulation stance of Fraser and the Liberal Party.

== Treasurer ==
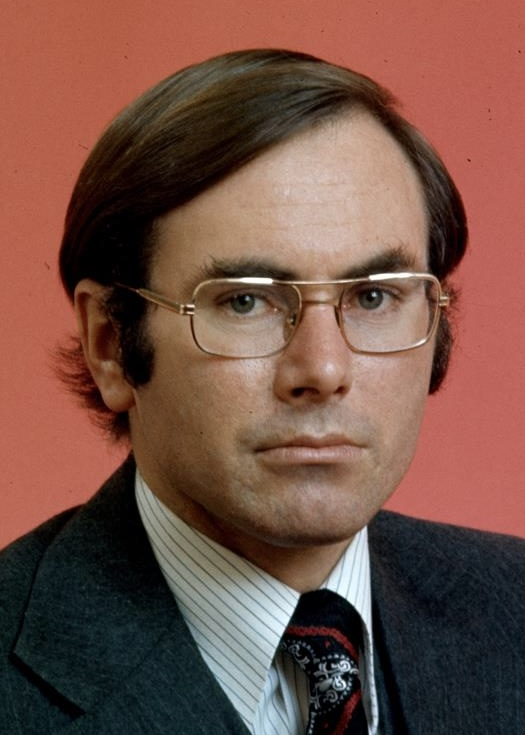
Howard in 1974, the year of his first election to parliament

In December 1977, aged 38, Howard was appointed Treasurer, in place of Phillip Lynch. He was the youngest Treasurer since Chris Watson in 1904. Fraser said in his memoirs that he appointed him despite his limited experience because "he was bright and he got across a brief well, and he was a good manager". During his five years in the position, Howard became an adherent of free-market economics, which was challenging economic orthodoxies in place for most of the century. He came to favour tax reform including broad-based taxation (later the GST), a freer industrial system including the dismantling of the centralised wage-fixing system, the abolition of compulsory trade unionism, privatisation and deregulation.

In 1978, the Fraser government instigated the Campbell Committee to investigate financial system reforms. Howard supported the Campbell report, but adopted an incremental approach with Cabinet, as there was wide opposition to deregulation within the government and the treasury. The process of reform began before the committee reported 2 1/2 years later, with the introduction of the tender system for the sale of Treasury notes in 1979, and Treasury bonds in 1982. Ian Macfarlane described these reforms as "second only in importance to the float of the Australian dollar in 1983." In 1981, Howard proposed a broad-based indirect tax with compensatory cuts in personal rates; however, cabinet rejected it citing both inflationary and political reasons. After the free-marketeers or "drys" of the Liberals challenged the protectionist policies of Minister for Industry and Commerce Phillip Lynch, they shifted their loyalties to Howard. Following an unsuccessful leadership challenge by Andrew Peacock to unseat Fraser as prime minister, Howard was elected deputy leader of the Liberal Party in April 1982. His election depended largely on the support of the "drys", and he became the party's champion of the growing free-market lobby.

The economic crises of the early 1980s brought Howard into conflict with the Keynesian Fraser. As the economy headed towards the worst recession since the 1930s, Fraser pushed an expansionary fiscal position much to Howard's and Treasury's horror. With his authority as treasurer being flouted, Howard considered resigning in July 1982, but, after discussions with his wife and senior advisor John Hewson, he decided to "tough it out". The 1982 wages explosion—wages rose 16 per cent across the country—resulted in stagflation; unemployment touched double-digits and inflation peaked at 12.5% (official interest rates peaked at 21%).

The Fraser government with Howard as Treasurer lost the 1983 election to the Labor Party led by Bob Hawke. Over the course of the 1980s, the Liberal Party came to accept the free-market policies that Fraser had resisted and Howard had espoused. Policies included low protection, decentralisation of wage fixation, financial deregulation, a broadly based indirect tax, and the rejection of counter-cyclical fiscal policy.

== Opposition ==
Following the defeat of the Fraser government and Fraser's subsequent resignation from parliament, Howard contested the Liberal leadership against Andrew Peacock, losing 36–20. However, he was re-elected as deputy leader. The Liberal Party were again defeated by Labor at the early 1984 election. In 1985, as Labor's position in opinion polls improved, Peacock's popularity sank and Howard's profile rose. Leadership speculation persisted, and Peacock said he would no longer accept Howard as deputy unless he offered assurances that he would not challenge for the leadership. Following Howard's refusal to offer such an assurance, Peacock sought, in September 1985, to replace him with John Moore as deputy leader. The party room re-elected Howard as deputy on 5 September 38 votes to 31, which Peacock treated as a vote of no confidence in his leadership. He subsequently called a leadership ballot, which he chose not to contest. Howard defeated Jim Carlton by 57 votes to six, thus becoming Leader of the Opposition.

=== Leader of the Opposition (1985–1989) ===
==== New economic policy ====
Howard was in effect the Liberal party's first pro-market leader in the conservative Coalition and spent the next two years working to revise Liberal policy away from that of Fraser's. In his own words he was an "economic radical" and a social conservative. Referring to the pro-market liberalism of the 1980s, Howard said in July 1986 that "The times will suit me". That year the economy was seen to be in crisis with a 40% devaluation of the Australian dollar, a marked increase in the current account deficit and the loss of the Federal Government's triple A rating. In response to the economic circumstances, Howard persistently attacked the Labor government and offered his free-market reform agenda. Support for the Labor Party and Hawke strengthened in 1985 and 1986 and Howard's approval ratings dropped in the face of infighting between Howard and Peacock supporters, a "public manifestation of disunity" over policy positions, and questions over Howard's leadership.

Hawke called the 1987 federal election six months early. In addition to the Howard–Peacock rivalry, Queensland National Party criticism of the federal Liberal and National leadership culminated in longtime Queensland Premier Joh Bjelke-Petersen making a bid to become prime minister himself—the "Joh for Canberra" campaign. Keating campaigned against Howard's proposed tax changes forcing Howard to admit a double-counting in the proposal, and emphasising to the electorate that the package would mean at that stage undisclosed cuts to government services.

Howard was not helped when the federal Nationals broke off the Coalition agreement in support of the "Joh for Canberra" push, which led to a large number of three-cornered contests. Bjelke-Petersen abandoned his bid for prime minister a month before the election, however, the damage had already been done. Additionally, a number of swing voters outside Queensland were alarmed at the prospect of Bjelke-Petersen holding the balance of power, and voted for Labor to ensure that the Liberals and Nationals would be defeated. As a result, the Hawke government was handily reelected, winning the most seats that Labor had ever won in an election.

==== Social agenda ====
In his social agenda, Howard promoted the traditional family and was antipathetic to the promotion of multiculturalism at the expense of a shared Australian identity. The controversial immigration policy, One Australia, outlined a vision of "one nation and one future" and opposed multiculturalism. Howard publicly suggested that to support "social cohesion" the rate of Asian immigration be "slowed down a little". The comments divided opinion within the Coalition, and undermined Howard's standing amongst Liberal party figures including federal and state Ministers, intellectual opinion makers, business leaders, and within the Asia Pacific. Three Liberal MPs crossed the floor and two abstained in response to a motion put forward by Prime Minister Hawke to affirm that race or ethnicity would not be used as immigrant selection criteria. Multiple Liberals later nominated the issue as instrumental in Howard subsequently losing the leadership in 1989. In a 1995 newspaper article (and in 2002 as prime minister), Howard recanted his 1988 remarks on curbing Asian immigration.

In line with "One Australia's" rejection of Aboriginal land rights, Howard said the idea of an Aboriginal treaty was "repugnant to the ideals of One Australia" and commented "I don't think it is wrong, racist, immoral or anything, for a country to say 'we will decide what the cultural identity and the cultural destiny of this country will be and nobody else." Howard is opposed to abortion and voted against the RU-486 abortion drug being legalised.

=== Loss of the leadership ===
As the country's economic position worsened in 1989, public opinion moved away from Labor, however there was no firm opinion poll lead for Howard or the Coalition. In February, Liberal Party president and prominent businessman, John Elliott, said confidentially to Andrew Peacock that he would support him in a leadership challenge against Howard, and in May a surprise leadership coup was launched, ousting Howard as Liberal leader. When asked that day whether he could become Liberal leader again, Howard likened it to "Lazarus with a triple bypass". The loss of the Liberal Party leadership to Peacock deeply affected Howard, who admitted he would occasionally drink too much. Declining Peacock's offer of Shadow Education, Howard went to the backbench and a new period of party disunity ensued which was highlighted by a Four Corners episode detailing the coup against Howard.

Following the Coalition's 1990 election loss, Howard considered challenging Peacock for the leadership, but didn't have enough support for a bid. Ultimately, Peacock resigned and was replaced with Howard's former staffer John Hewson who defeated Peter Reith; Peacock supported Hewson as a symbol of generational change. Howard was a supporter of Hewson's economic program, with a Goods and Services Tax (GST) as its centrepiece. Howard was Shadow Minister for Industrial relations and oversaw Jobsback section of Fightback. After Hewson lost the "unloseable" 1993 election to Paul Keating, Howard unsuccessfully challenged Hewson for the leadership. In 1994, he was again passed over for the leadership, which went to Alexander Downer. Hewson had pledged to resign if defeated in 1993 but did not resign to block Howard from succeeding him.

=== Leader of the Opposition (1995–1996) ===
In January 1995, leaked internal Liberal Party polling showed that with gaffe-prone Downer as leader, the Coalition had slim chance of holding its marginal seats in the next election, let alone of winning government. Media speculation of a leadership spill ended when, on 26 January 1995, Downer resigned as Liberal Leader and Howard was elected unopposed to replace him. The Coalition subsequently opened a large lead over Labor in most opinion polls, and Howard overtook Paul Keating as preferred prime minister. Hoping to avoid a repeat of mistakes made at the 1993 election, Howard revised his earlier statements against Medicare and Asian immigration, describing Australia as "a unique intersection between Europe, North America and Asia". This allowed Howard to campaign on a "small-target" strategy. He focused on the economy and memory of the early 1990s recession, and on the longevity of the Labor government, which in 1996 had been in power for 13 years. In May 1995, Howard promised that a GST would "never ever" be part of the Liberal Party's policy. Howard, when making the promise, referred to the GST as being a losing policy for Hewson's election campaign in 1993.

== Prime minister ==
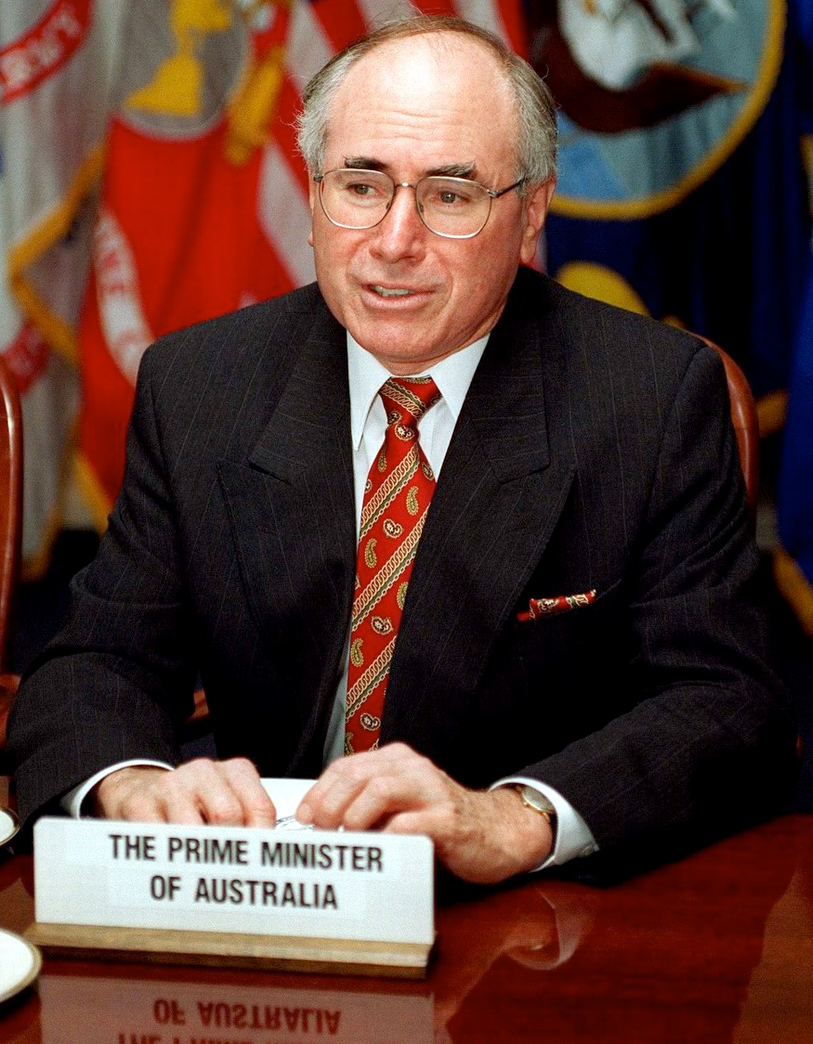
Howard in June 1997, just over a year after becoming prime minister

=== First term ===
By the time the writs were issued for the 1996 election, the Coalition had been well ahead of Labor in opinion polls for over a year. The consensus of most opinion polls was that Howard would be the next prime minister.

With the support of some traditionally Labor voters—dubbed "Howard battlers"—Howard and the Liberal-National Coalition swept to power on the back of a 29-seat swing. This was the second-worst defeat of an incumbent government since Federation. The Coalition picked up a five per cent swing, taking 13 seats away from Labor in New South Wales, and winning all but two seats in Queensland. The Liberals actually won a majority in their own right with 75 seats, the most that the party had ever won. It was only the third time (the others being 1975 and 1977) that the main non-Labor party has been even theoretically able to govern alone since the Coalition's formation. Nevertheless, Howard kept the Nationals in his government.

Howard entered office with a 45-seat majority—the second-biggest majority in Australian history, only behind Fraser's 55-seat majority in 1975. At the age of 56, he was sworn in as prime minister on 11 March 1996, ending a record 13 years of Coalition opposition. Howard departed from tradition and made his primary residence Kirribilli House in Sydney rather than The Lodge in Canberra. Early in the term Howard had championed significant new restrictions on gun ownership following the Port Arthur massacre in which 35 people had been shot dead. Achieving agreement in the face of immense opposition from within the Coalition and some State governments, was credited with significantly elevating Howard's stature as prime minister despite a backlash from core Coalition rural constituents.

Howard's initial silence on the views of Pauline Hanson—a disendorsed Liberal Party candidate and later independent MP from the Brisbane area—was criticised in the press as an endorsement of her views. When Hanson had made derogatory statements about minorities, Howard not only cancelled her Liberal endorsement, but declared she would not be allowed to sit as a Liberal if elected. Howard repudiated Hanson's views seven months after her maiden speech.

Following the Wik Decision of the High Court in 1996, the Howard government moved swiftly to legislate limitations on its possible implications through the so-called Ten-Point Plan.

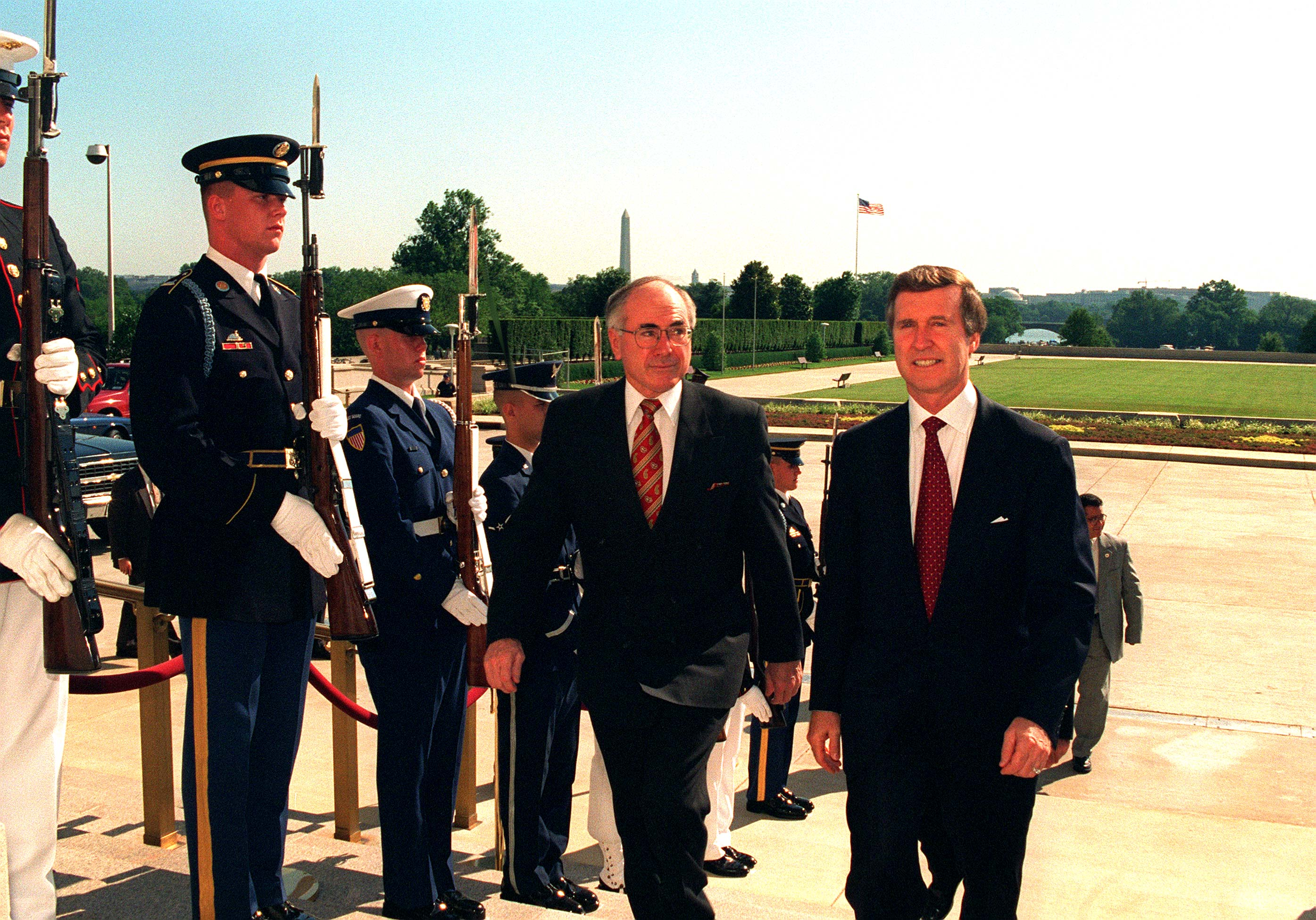
Howard and US Secretary of Defense William Cohen in 1997

From 1997, Howard spearheaded the Coalition push to introduce a Goods and Services Tax (GST) at the subsequent election; this was despite saying, before winning the prime ministership, that it would "never ever" be part of Coalition policy. A long-held conviction of Howard's, his tax reform package was credited with "breaking the circuit" of party morale—boosting his confidence and direction, which had appeared to wane early in the Government's second term. The 1998 election was dubbed a "referendum on the GST", and the tax changes—including the GST—were implemented in the government's second term after amendments to the legislation were negotiated with the Australian Democrats to ensure its passage through the Senate.

Through much of its first term, opinion polling was disappointing for the government. The popularity of Pauline Hanson, and the new restrictions on gun ownership drew multiple traditionally Coalition voters away from the Howard government. Also unpopular with voters were large spending cuts aimed at eliminating the budget deficit (and Howard's distinction between "core" and "non-core" election promises when cutting spending commitments), industrial changes and the 1998 waterfront dispute, the partial sale of government telecommunications company Telstra, and the Government's commitment to a GST.

Howard called a snap election for October 1998, three months sooner than required. The Coalition actually lost the national two-party preferred vote to Labor, suffering a 14-seat swing. However, the uneven nature of the swing allowed Howard to win a second term in government, with a considerably reduced majority (from 45 seats to 12). Howard himself finished just short of a majority on the first count in his own seat, and was only assured of reelection on the ninth count. He ultimately finished with a fairly comfortable 56 per cent of the two-party preferred vote.

=== Second term ===
In 1998, Howard convened a constitutional convention which decided in principle that Australia should become a republic. At the convention Howard confirmed himself as a monarchist, and said that of the republican options, he preferred the minimalist model. Howard outlined his support for retaining the Australian constitutional monarchy. Despite opinion polls suggesting Australians favoured a republic, a 1999 referendum rejected the model chosen by the convention. The new President of Indonesia, B.J. Habibie, had some months earlier agreed to grant special autonomy to Indonesian-occupied East Timor. However, following the receipt of a letter sent by Howard to Habibie suggesting that a referendum be held, Habibie made a snap decision to hold a vote on independence. This referendum on the territory's independence triggered a Howard and Downer orchestrated shift in Australian policy. In September 1999, Howard organised an Australian-led international peace-keeping force to East Timor (INTERFET), after pro-Indonesia militia launched a violent "scorched-earth" campaign in retaliation to the referendum's overwhelming vote in favour of independence. The successful mission was widely supported by Australian voters, but the government was criticised for "foreign policy failure" following the violence and collapse of diplomatic relations with Indonesia. By Howard's fourth term, relations with Indonesia had recovered to include counter-terrorism cooperation and Australia's $1bn Boxing Day Tsunami relief efforts, and were assisted by good relations between Howard and Indonesian president Susilo Bambang Yudhoyono.

Throughout his prime-ministership, Howard was resolute in his refusal to provide a parliamentary "apology" to Indigenous Australians as recommended by the 1997 "Bringing Them Home" Report. Howard made a personal apology before the release of the report.

In 1999, Howard negotiated a "Motion of Reconciliation" with Aboriginal Senator Aden Ridgeway. Eschewing use of the word "sorry", the motion recognised mistreatment of Aborigines as the "most blemished chapter" in Australia's history; offered "deep and sincere regret" for past injustices. Following his 2007 loss of the prime ministership, Howard was the only living former prime minister who declined to attend the February 2008 apology made by Kevin Rudd with bi-partisan support.

Howard did not commit to serving a full term if he won the next election; on his 61st birthday in July 2000 he said he would consider the question of retirement when he turned 64. This was interpreted as boosting Costello's leadership aspirations, and the enmity over leadership and succession resurfaced publicly when Howard did not retire at the age of 64. In the first half of 2001, rising petrol prices, voter enmity over the implementation of the GST, a spike in inflation and economic slowdown led to bad opinion polls and predictions the Government would lose office in the election later that year. The government announced a series of policy reversals and softenings which boosted the government's fortunes, as did news that the economy had avoided recession. The government's position on "border protection", in particular the Tampa affair where Howard refused the landing of asylum seekers rescued by a Norwegian freighter, and the Children Overboard affair where Howard misguided the public by falsy claiming children were being thrown from boats in a presumed ploy to secure rescue, consolidated the improving polls for the government, as did the 11 September 2001 attacks. Howard led the government to victory in the 2001 federal election with an increased majority.

=== Third term ===
Howard had first met US President George W. Bush in the days before the 11 September terrorist attacks and was in Washington the morning of the attacks. In response to the attacks, Howard invoked the ANZUS Treaty. In October 2001, he committed Australian military personnel to the War in Afghanistan despite widespread opposition. Howard developed a strong personal relationship with the president, and they shared often similar ideological positions – including on the role of the United States in world affairs and their approach to the "war on terror". In May 2003, Howard made an overnight stay at Bush's Prairie Chapel Ranch in Texas, after which Bush said that Howard "...is not only a man of steel, he's showed the world he's a man of heart."

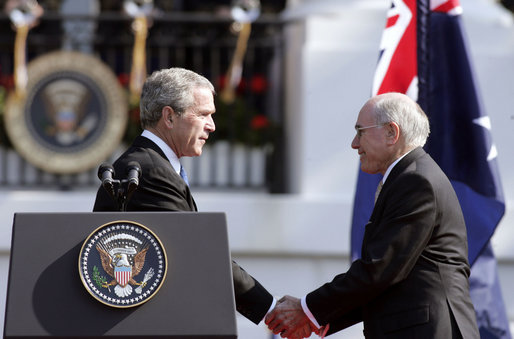
Howard maintained a strong friendship with US President George W. Bush

In April 2002, Howard was the first Australian prime minister to attend a royal funeral, that of Queen Elizabeth The Queen Mother. In October, Howard responded to the 2002 Bali bombing with calls for solidarity. Howard re-dedicated his government to the "war on terror".

In March 2003, Australia joined the US-led "Multinational force in Iraq" in sending 2,000 troops and naval units to support in the invasion of Iraq. In response to the Australian participation in the invasion, there were large protests in Australian cities during March 2003, and Prime Minister Howard was heckled from the public gallery of Parliament House. While opinion polls showed that opposition to the war without UN backing was between 48 and 92 per cent, Howard remained preferred prime-minister over the Leader of the Opposition, Simon Crean, although his approval ratings were lower compared to before the war.

Throughout 2002 and 2003, Howard had increased his opinion poll lead over Labor Party leader, Simon Crean. In December 2003, Crean resigned after losing party support and Mark Latham was elected leader. Howard called an election for 9 October 2004. While the government was behind Labor in the opinion polls, Howard himself had a large lead over Latham as preferred prime minister. In the lead up to the election, Howard again did not commit to serving a full term. Howard attacked Latham's economic record as Mayor of Liverpool City Council and attacked Labor's economic history. The election resulted in a five-seat swing to the Coalition, netting it a majority almost as large as in 1996. It also resulted the first, albeit slim, government majority in the Senate since 1981. For the second time since becoming prime minister, Howard came up short of a majority in the first count for his own seat. He was assured of reelection on the third count, ultimately winning 53.3 per cent of the two-party preferred vote. On 21 December 2004, Howard overtook Bob Hawke to become the second longest-serving Australian prime minister after Sir Robert Menzies.

=== Fourth term ===
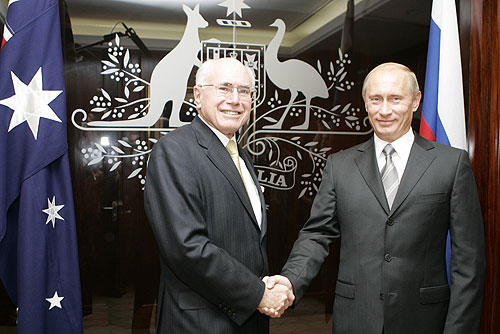
Howard with Russian president Vladimir Putin at the 2007 APEC Summit

In 2006, with the government now controlling both houses of parliament for the first time since the Fraser era, industrial relations changes were enacted. Named "WorkChoices" and championed by Howard, they were intended to fundamentally change the employer-employee relationship. Opposed by a broad trade union campaign and antipathy within the electorate, WorkChoices was subsequently seen as a major factor in the government's 2007 election loss.

In April 2006, the government announced it had completely paid off the last of $96 billion of Commonwealth net debt inherited when it came to power in 1996. By 2007, Howard had been in office for 11 of the 15 years of consecutive annual growth for the Australian economy. Unemployment had fallen from 8.1% at the start of his term to 4.1% in 2007, and average weekly earnings grew 24.4% in real terms. During his prime ministership, opinion polling consistently showed that a majority of the electorate thought his government were better to handle the economy than the Opposition.

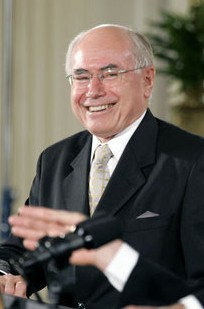
Howard in 2006

In 2006, Ian McLachlan and Peter Costello said that under a 1994 deal between Howard and Costello, Howard would serve one and a half terms as prime minister if the Coalition won the next election before stepping aside to allow Costello to take over. Howard denied that this constituted a deal; Citing strong party room support for him as leader, Howard stated later that month that he would remain to contest the 2007 election. Six weeks before the election, Howard indicated he would stand down during the next term, and anointed Costello as his successor. The Coalition trailed Labor in opinion polls from mid-2006 onward, but Howard still consistently led Labor leader Kim Beazley on the question of preferred prime minister. In December 2006, after Kevin Rudd became Labor leader, the two-party preferred deficit widened even further and Rudd swiftly overtook Howard as preferred prime minister. Howard chaired APEC Australia 2007, culminating in the APEC Economic Leaders Meeting in Sydney during September. The meeting was at times overshadowed by further leadership speculation following continued poor poll results.

In May 2006, the degradation of Aboriginal communities, and the frequent child sexual abuses that occurred within these, was brought to the forefront of the public's mind. In response to this, a report into child sexual abuse in the Northern Territory was commissioned. Following this, there was an intervention into these Northern Territory communities. This received widespread criticism, with some holding that it was no more than another attempt to control these communities. Howard was not exempt from this criticism on the grounds of racism.

Howard supported the Bush administration's 2007 surge strategy in Iraq, and criticised Democrat US presidential candidate Barack Obama for calling for a complete withdrawal of Coalition troops by March 2008.

==== 2007 election ====
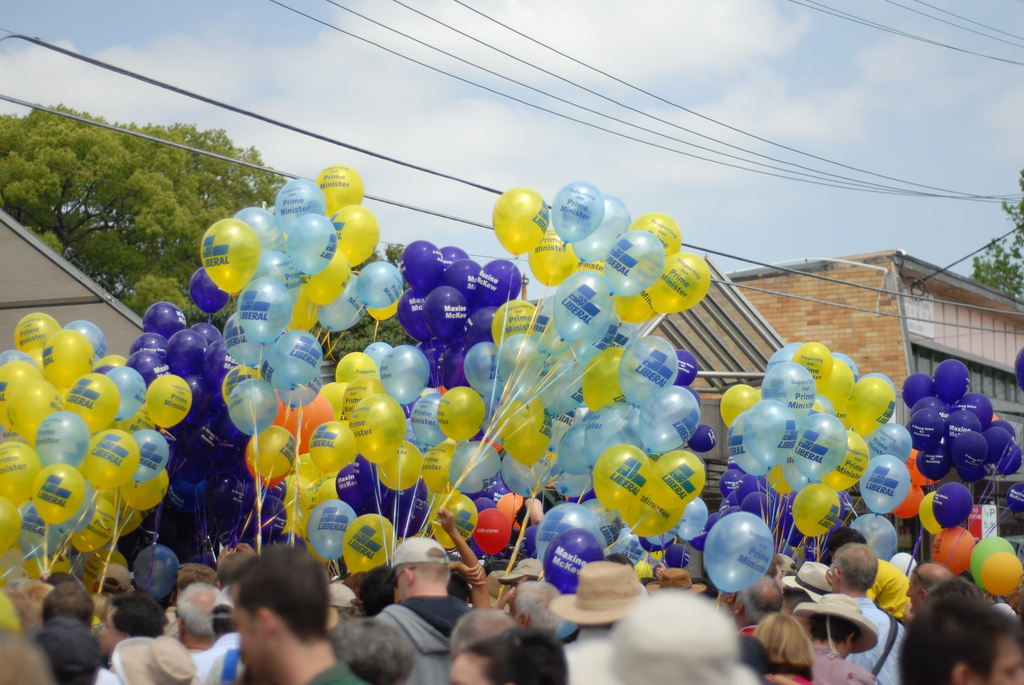
Electioneering balloons from the Liberal and Labor parties in Bennelong during the 2007 federal election

Leading up to the 24 November election, the Coalition had been behind Labor in the polls for almost two years, a margin that grew even larger after Rudd became opposition leader. In the election, Howard and his government were defeated, suffering a 23-seat swing to Labor, which was almost as large as the 29-seat swing that propelled him to power in 1996. During the election campaign he was targeted by protesters including the John Howard Ladies Auxiliary Fanclub. Howard lost his seat of Bennelong to former journalist Maxine McKew with 44,685 votes (51.4 per cent) to Howard's 42,251 (48.6 per cent). The latest redistribution placed Bennelong right on the edge of seats Labor needed to win to make Rudd prime minister. The ABC actually listed Bennelong as a Labor gain on election night. However, the result remained in doubt for a few days after the election. The final tally indicated that McKew defeated Howard on the 14th count due to a large flow of Green preferences to her; 3,793 (78.84 per cent) of Green voters listed McKew as their second preference. Howard was only the second Australian prime minister to lose his seat in an election since Stanley Bruce in 1929. He remained in office as caretaker prime minister until the formal swearing in of Rudd's government on 3 December.

Media analysis of The Australian Election Study, a postal survey of 1,873 voters during the 2007 poll, found that although respondents respected Howard and thought he had won the 6-week election campaign, Howard was considered "at odds with public opinion on cut-through issues", his opponent had achieved the highest "likeability" rating in the survey's 20-year history, and a majority had decided their voting intention before the election campaign.

== Retirement ==
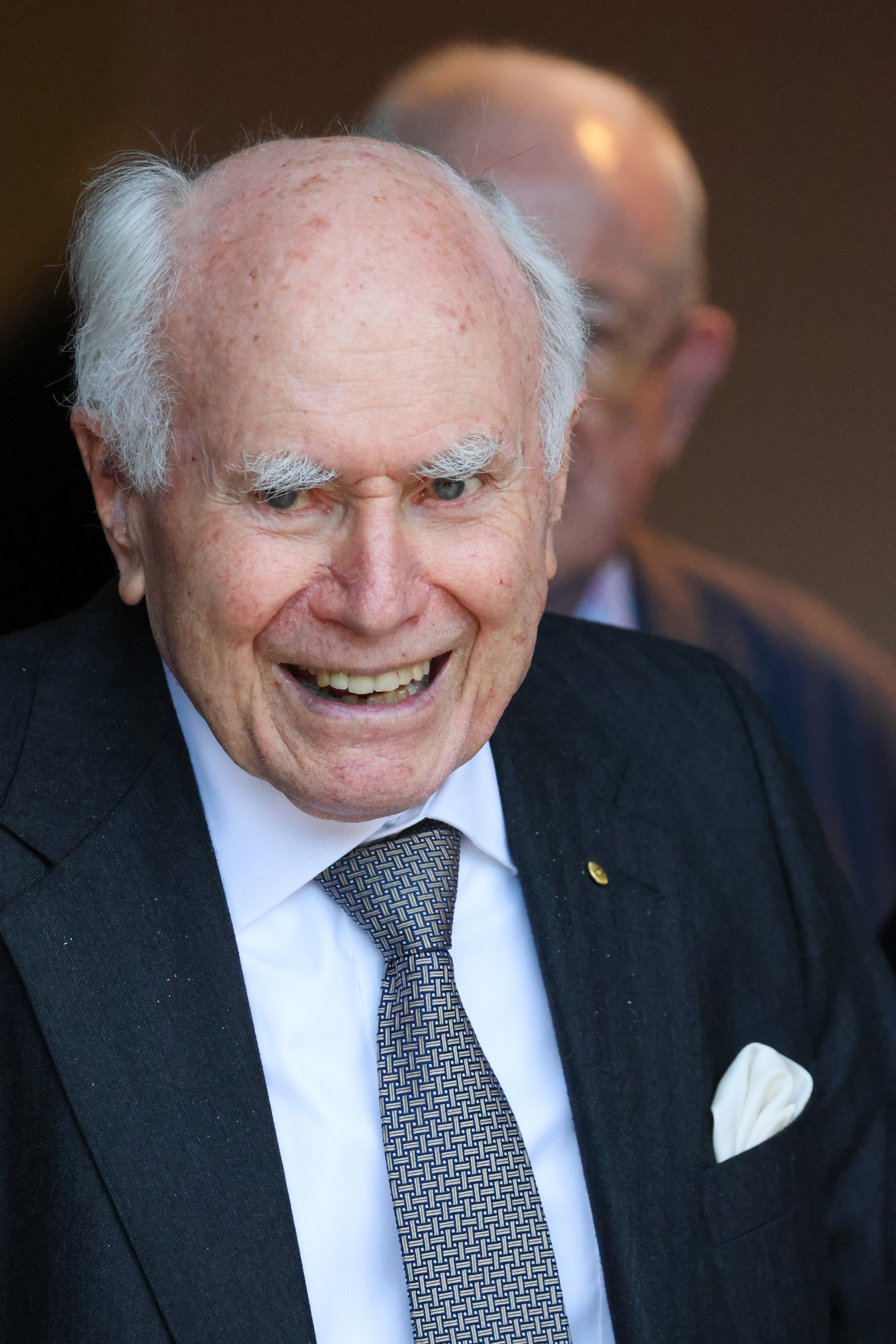
Howard at the funeral of Legh Davis in May 2026

In January 2008, Howard signed with the speaking agency called the Washington Speakers Bureau, joining Tony Blair, Colin Powell, Madeleine Albright, and others. He was available for two speeches, Leadership in the New Century and The Global Economic Future.

The Australian and New Zealand cricket boards unsuccessfully nominated Howard as their candidate for president of the International Cricket Council (ICC). Howard was the chairman of the International Democrat Union (IDU), a body of international conservative political parties, between 2002 and 2014, when he was succeeded by John Key of New Zealand. In 2008, he was appointed a director of the foundation established to preserve the legacy of Donald Bradman.

Howard was the subject of a lengthy interview series by The Australian columnist Janet Albrechtsen in 2014, which aired as a featured story on Seven Network's Sunday Night, and again in January 2015 as its own five-part series on Sky News Australia entitled Howard Defined. In November 2017, Howard launched the Ramsay Centre for Western Civilisation, headed by Simon Haines, formerly professor of English at the Chinese University of Hong Kong. In 2017, Howard endorsed a "No" vote in the Australian Marriage Law Postal Survey and joined the campaign against same-sex marriage.

In February 2019, Howard provided a character reference for Cardinal George Pell, a senior leader of the Catholic Church in Australia and former Vatican Treasurer, whose conviction on five counts of child sexual abuse while Archbishop of Melbourne was later overturned by the High Court. Howard's character reference followed Pell's convictions, and was provided along with nine others to support Pell's barrister's submissions in the pre-sentencing hearing.

In October 2021, Howard endorsed Dominic Perrottet to succeed Gladys Berejiklian as Premier of New South Wales following Berejiklian's resignation as Premier.

In July 2023, ahead of the Australian Indigenous Voice referendum, Howard said that "the luckiest thing that happened to this country was being colonised by the British. Not that they were perfect by any means, but they were infinitely more successful and beneficent colonisers than other European countries".

== Personal life ==
Howard married fellow Liberal Party member Janette Parker in 1971, with whom he had three children: Melanie (1974), Tim (1977) and Richard (1980). John and Janette are Christians.

Howard established a habit of walking to start each morning as prime minister.

== Honours ==
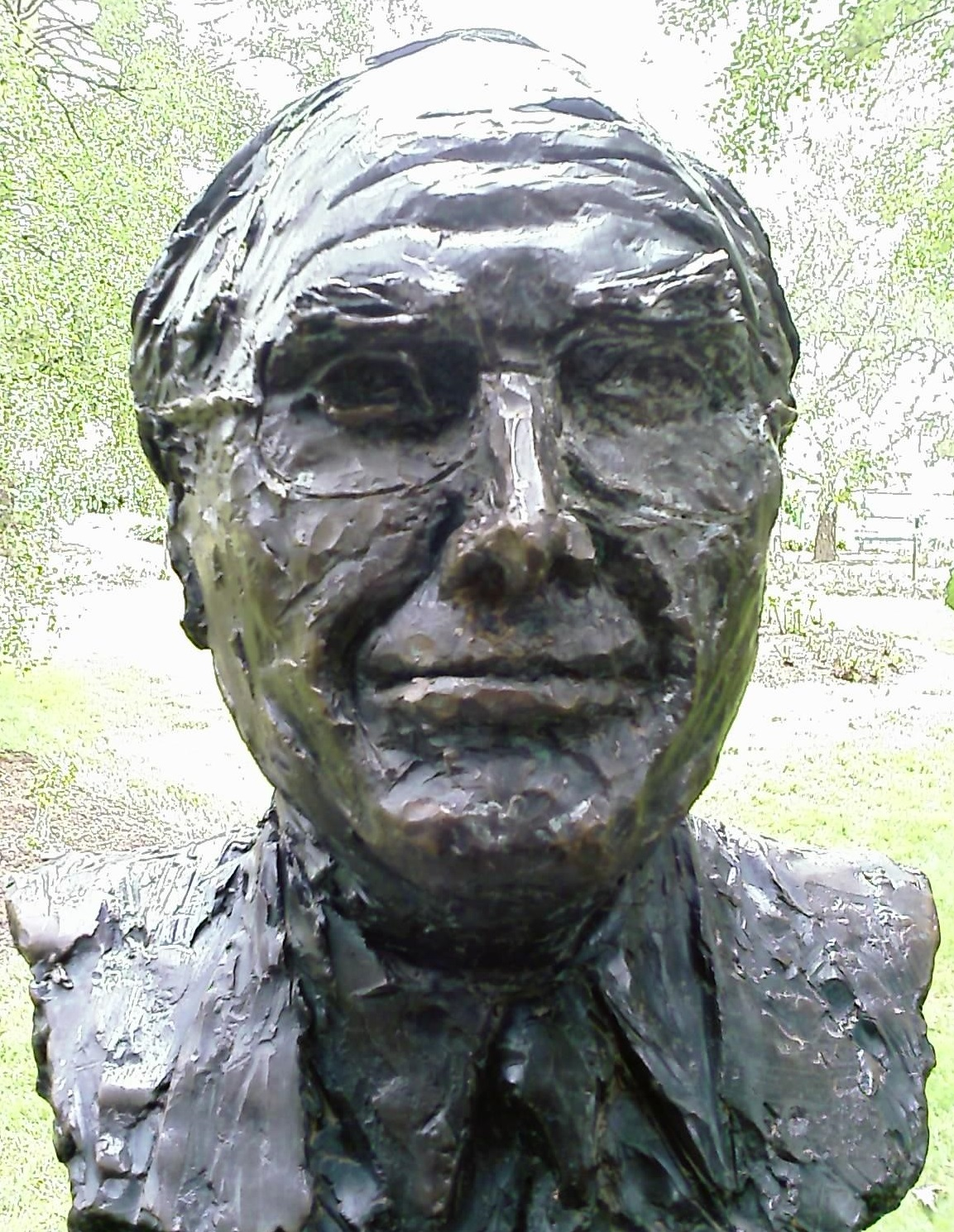
Bust of John Howard by political cartoonist, caricaturist and sculptor Peter Nicholson located in the Prime Minister's Avenue in the Ballarat Botanical Gardens

=== Orders ===
- 26 January 2008: Companion of the Order of Australia (AC) "for distinguished service to the Parliament of Australia, particularly as prime minister and through contributions to economic and social policy reform, fostering and promoting Australia's interests internationally, and the development of significant philanthropic links between the business sector, arts and charitable organisations".
- 1 January 2012: Member of the Order of Merit (OM) by Queen Elizabeth II

=== Medals ===
- (Australia) 1 January 2001: Centenary Medal

=== Foreign honours ===
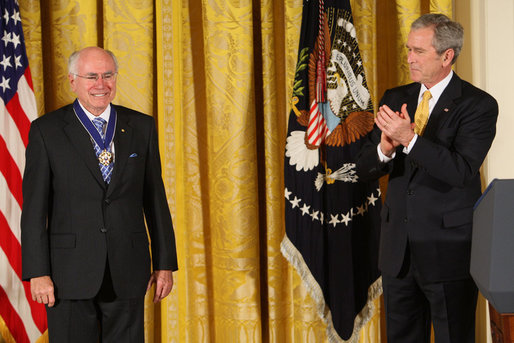
Howard being awarded the Presidential Medal of Freedom by U.S. President George W. Bush

- Solomon Islands 15 June 2005: Star of the Solomon Islands (SSI)
- United States 13 January 2009: Presidential Medal of Freedom by the president of the United States, George W. Bush.
- Japan 10 December 2013: Grand Cordon of the Order of the Rising Sun by the Japanese Government, represented by Ambassador Yoshitaka Akimoto.

=== Organisations ===
- (Australia) 26 January 1997: Australian Father of the Year
- United States 22 August 2005: Woodrow Wilson Award from the Woodrow Wilson Center of the U.S. Smithsonian Institution
- United States May 2006: Presidential Gold Medal from the B'nai B'rith International
- United States 5 March 2008: Irving Kristol Award from the American Enterprise Institute
- United States 6 April 2008: Common Wealth Award of Distinguished Service for services to Government
- 20 November 2003: IOC Gold Olympic Order

=== Appointments ===
- Israel 30 November 2008 – present: Hebrew University of Jerusalem, Honorary Doctorate for "outstanding statesmanship and leading role on the world stage in promoting democracy and combating international terrorism" and his "remarkable understanding of, and exceptional support for, the State of Israel and his deep friendship with the Australian Jewish community".
- 14 February 2009 – present: Bond University, Honorary doctorate
- 10 April 2012 – present: Macquarie University, Honorary Doctor of Letters
- 30 September 2016 – present: University of Sydney, Honorary Doctor of Letters
- 14 April 2021 – present: University of Newcastle, Honorary Doctor of Letters

== See also ==
- First Howard Ministry
- Second Howard Ministry
- Third Howard Ministry
- Fourth Howard Ministry
- SIEV X

== Bibliography ==
- Betts, Katharine (1996). "People and Place". People and Place. 4 (4): 38–45.
- Blaxland, John (2013). The Australian Army from Whitlam to Howard: Chapter 3 East Timor, 1999–2000. Cambridge University Press.
- Fraser, Malcolm; Simons, Margaret (2011). Malcolm Fraser: The Political Memoirs. The Miegunyah Press.
- Howard, John (2010). Lazarus Rising. Harper Collins. pp. 35–36. ISBN 9780732289959.
- Ward, Ian (December 1995). "Australian Political Chronicle: January–June 1995". Australian Journal of Politics and History. 41 (3).

Year	Review article	Work(s) reviewed
2016	Howard, John (January–February 2016). "Seized with outcomes". Quadrant. 60 (1–2): 73–75.	Moore, Charles (2015). Margaret Thatcher : the authorized biography, volume two : everything she wants. Allen Lane.

Parliament of Australia
Preceded by John Cramer	Member for Bennelong; 1974–2007	Succeeded by Maxine McKew
Political offices
Preceded by Bob Ellicott	Opposition Spokesperson for Consumer Affairs and Commerce; 1975	Succeeded by Mick Young as Opposition Spokesperson on Industry and Commerce
Preceded by Bob Cotton as Minister for Science and Consumer Affairs	Minister for Business and Consumer Affairs; 1975–1977	Succeeded by Wal Fife
Preceded by Lionel Bowen	Minister Assisting the Prime Minister; 1977	Succeeded by Ian Viner
Preceded by Ian Sinclair	Minister for Special Trade Negotiations; 1977	Succeeded by Victor Garland as Minister for Special Trade Representations
Preceded by Phillip Lynch	Treasurer of Australia; 1977–1983	Succeeded by Paul Keating
Preceded by Eric Robinson	Minister for Finance; 1979	Succeeded by Eric Robinson
Preceded by Lionel Bowen	Deputy Leader of the Opposition; 1983–1985	Succeeded by Neil Brown
Preceded by Paul Keating	Shadow Treasurer of Australia; 1983–1985	Succeeded by Jim Carlton
Preceded by Andrew Peacock	Leader of the Opposition; 1985–1989	Succeeded by Andrew Peacock
Preceded by Austin Lewis	Shadow Minister for Industry, Technology and Commerce; 1989–1990	Succeeded by Ian McLachlan as Shadow Minister for Industry and Commerce
Preceded by Fred Chaney as Shadow Minister for Industrial Relations	Shadow Minister for Industrial Relations, Employment and Training; 1990–1993	Succeeded by Himself as Shadow Minister for Industrial Relations
Preceded by Julian Beale as Shadow Minister for Employment, Training and Youth Affairs	Shadow Minister for Industrial Relations, Employment and Training; 1990–1993	Succeeded by Michael Wooldridge as Shadow Minister for Education, Employment and Training
New office	Shadow Minister Assisting the Leader of the Opposition on the Public Service; 1990–1993	Succeeded by Bob McMullan as Assistant to the Opposition Leader on Public Service Matters
Preceded by Warwick Smith	Manager of Opposition Business in the House; 1993–1995	Succeeded by Peter Reith
Preceded by Himself as Shadow Minister for Industrial Relations, Employment and Training	Shadow Minister for Industrial Relations; 1993–1995	Succeeded by Peter Reith
Preceded by Alexander Downer	Leader of the Opposition; 1995–1996	Succeeded by Kim Beazley
Preceded by Paul Keating	Prime Minister of Australia; 1996–2007	Succeeded by Kevin Rudd
Party political offices
Preceded by Phillip Lynch	Deputy Leader of the Liberal Party of Australia; 1982–1985	Succeeded by Neil Brown
Preceded by Andrew Peacock	Leader of the Liberal Party of Australia; 1985–1989	Succeeded by Andrew Peacock
Preceded by Alexander Downer	Leader of the Liberal Party of Australia; 1995–2007	Succeeded by Brendan Nelson
Diplomatic posts
Preceded by Thabo Mbeki	Chairperson of the Commonwealth of Nations; 2002–2003	Succeeded by Olusegun Obasanjo
Preceded by Nguyễn Minh Triết	Chairperson of APEC; 2007	Succeeded by Alan García
