= William Lyall =

William Lyall may refer to:

- William Lyall (politician) (1821-1888), Australian politician, member of the Victorian Legislative Assembly
- William Lyall (priest), English churchman
- William Lyall (businessman) Scottish–American merchant and businessman
- William John Campbell Lyall, Scottish rugby union player
- Bill Lyall, Canadian politician, member of the Northwest Territories Legislative Assembly
- Billy Lyall, Scottish musician
