= Singeing (textiles) =

Method of textile preparation

Singeing is a preparation method of textiles; it is applied more commonly to woven textiles and cotton yarns where a clean surface is essential. Singeing in textiles is a mechanical treatment or finish to obtain a neat surface of the fabric or less hairy yarn. In a singeing machine, the yarns or fabrics are exposed to direct flames or to the heated plates to burn the protruding fibers. It is also called "gassing."

== Objective ==
Singeing is a surface finishing procedure that is followed by mercerising, dyeing, printing, and other textile manufacturing steps. When Greige goods leave the loom, they may have a downy appearance with protruding fibers, which is undesirable for printed goods. The application takes place on loom goods or the yarn stage itself. Singeing is an application of direct flame onto the surface of yarn or fabric. Cotton yarn is produced with discrete length fibers. Shot fibers inevitably tend to show less spinnability and result in a hairy surface in yarn and subsequently in fabric. Hairy fabrics are less desirable than the clean ones. Singeing burns those protruding fibers that are lying out and produce a clean surface.

=== Advantage ===
Singeing improves the surface appearance by removing fuzzy fibers and improves luster, and the pilling. The smoother and cleaner yarns break less frequently, which increases the fabric's productivity in weaving (or on the loom or knitting machine) and quality as well.

=== Disadvantages ===
Using improper methods when singeing the fabric may result in reduced strength. Yellowing of the material due to over exposure may also occur.

Singeing may affect the properties and quality of synthetic and blended fabrics since they are thermoplastic and can melt.

== Biopolishing ==
Biopolishing is an alternative method that is an enzymetic treatment to clean the surface of cellulosic fabrics or yarns. It is also named ''Biosingeing.'' Cellulosic degradation of protruding fibers makes the surface clean.

== Gassing ==
The term "gassing" is commonly used in relation to yarn. This process involves burning protruding fibers on the yarn (rather than the woven fabric) using direct flame. Gassing can be more efficient (though more costly, as more material is lost) than singeing, as in the latter, only the hairs protruding from the fabric are burned off.

== See also ==
- Scouring (textiles)
- Heatsetting
- Lisle (textiles)
