= Charles Lyell, 2nd Baron Lyell =

British recipient of the Victoria Cross

The Right Honourable The Baron Lyell VC
- Born: 14 June 1913; Chelsea, London
- Died: 27 April 1943 (aged 29); Dj Bou Arada, Tunisia
- Burial place: Massicault War Cemetery
- Relatives: Charles Henry Lyell (father)
- Military career
- Allegiance: United Kingdom
- Branch: British Army
- Service years: 1933–1943
- Rank: Captain
- Service number: 57781
- Units: Scots Guards
- Conflicts: World War II: North African campaign; Tunisian campaign †
- Awards: Victoria Cross
- Other work: County Councillor for Angus

Captain Charles Antony Lyell, 2nd Baron Lyell, VC (14 June 1913 – 27 April 1943) was a British recipient of the Victoria Cross, the highest and most prestigious award for gallantry in the face of the enemy that can be awarded to British and Commonwealth forces.

== Background ==
He was the son of Charles Henry Lyell and his wife Rosalind Margaret Watney. His father died in 1918 and he succeeded his grandfather as Baron Lyell in 1926. He was educated at Eton College and matriculated at Christ Church, Oxford in 1932, graduating in 1936. Both his father and his grandfather, Leonard Lyell were Liberal MPs. Between 1936 and his death, Lord Lyell was a member of Boodle's club in St James's, London. He moved to his family's estate in Kirriemuir in Angus, where he was a county councillor before the Second World War .

He married Sophie Mary Trafford on 4 July 1938. They had one son, who became Charles Lyell, 3rd Baron Lyell.

His portrait was painted by James McIntosh Patrick in 1940.

== Victoria Cross action ==
Lyell was 29 years old, and a temporary captain in the 1st Battalion, Scots Guards, British Army during the Second World War when the following deed took place for which he was awarded the VC.

During the period 22–27 April 1943 near Dj Bou Arada, Tunisia, Captain Lord Lyell's outstanding leadership and gallantry enabled his company to take its objective. On 27 April accompanied by a sergeant, a lance-corporal and two guardsmen, he led an attack on an enemy post consisting of an 88mm gun and a heavy machine-gun in two separate pits. He destroyed the crew of the machine-gun with a hand grenade and then, three of the party having become casualties, and with the lance-corporal to give covering fire he leapt into the second pit, killing several of the crew before being overwhelmed and killed. Both the guns had been silenced. The others involved in the action were: Lance-Sergeant 2698583 James Robertson (killed), Lance-Corporal 2699878 James Ramage Kinghorn Lawrie, Guardsman 2698039 John Chisholm, and Guardsman 2697572 William Porter (died the next day from a head wound). Lance-Corporal Lawrie and Guardsman Chisholm received the Military Medal, whilst Lance-Sergeant Robertson and Guardsman William Porter were mentioned in dispatches by the king.

He is buried in the Massicault War Cemetery, southwest of Tunis.

== Arms ==
Coat of arms of Baron Lyell
Crest Upon a rock a dexter cubit arm erect in armour proper, charged with a cross parted and fretty gules, the hand grasping a sword in bend sinister also proper. Escutcheon Or a cross parted and fretty azure between four crosses patée gules, all within a bordure of the last. Supporters No supporters recorded at the College of Arms Motto Forti non Ignavo (To the brave, not to the dastardly).

== Citations ==
Peerage of the United Kingdom
Preceded by Leonard Lyell	Baron Lyell; 1926 – 1943	Succeeded by Charles Lyell
