= Charles Lyell, 3rd Baron Lyell =

British politician

The Right Honourable The Lord Lyell DL

Parliamentary Under-Secretary of State for Northern Ireland
- In office 12 April 1984 – 25 July 1989
- Monarch: Elizabeth II
- Prime Minister: Margaret Thatcher
- Preceded by: The Earl of Mansfield (Minister of State)
- Succeeded by: The Lord Skelmersdale

Lord-in-waiting Government Whip
- In office 9 May 1979 – 12 April 1984
- Monarch: Elizabeth II
- Prime Minister: Margaret Thatcher
- Preceded by: The Lord Leonard
- Succeeded by: The Earl of Caithness

Member of the House of Lords
- Lord Temporal
- Hereditary peerage 16 December 1960 – 11 November 1999
- Preceded by: The 2nd Baron Lyell
- Succeeded by: Seat abolished
- Elected Hereditary Peer; 11 November 1999 – 11 January 2017
- Election: 1999
- Preceded by: Seat established
- Succeeded by: The 4th Baron Colgrain

Personal details
- Born: 27 March 1939
- Died: 11 January 2017 (aged 77)
- Party: Conservative
- Education: Eton College; Christ Church, Oxford
- Occupation: Politician

Charles Lyell, 3rd Baron Lyell, DL (27 March 1939 – 11 January 2017) was a British politician and Conservative member of the House of Lords.

Lord Lyell was the son of Charles Lyell, 2nd Baron Lyell and Sophie Mary Trafford (1916–2012).

He succeeded to the peerage in 1943 at the age of 4 when his father was killed in action during the Second World War and was posthumously awarded the Victoria Cross. He was educated at Eton College and Christ Church, Oxford. On the formation of a Conservative government after the 1979 general election, Lord Lyell was made a House of Lords whip, serving until 1984. He was then moved to the Northern Ireland Office as a Parliamentary Under Secretary of State where he remained until he left the government in 1989.

Lyell was appointed a Deputy Lieutenant for Angus in 1988.

With the passage of the House of Lords Act 1999, Lord Lyell along with almost all other hereditary peers lost his automatic right to sit in the House of Lords. He was however elected as one of the 92 elected hereditary peers to remain in the House of Lords pending completion of House of Lords reform.

Lyell was Honorary Patron of Forfar Athletic F.C. and had been a supporter since a young age. He was a regular visitor to Station Park, always sponsoring the last home game of the season.

He died on 11 January 2017. At that time, he was the third longest serving member of the House of Lords, after Lord Carrington and Lord Denham. The barony became extinct on his death.

== Arms ==
Coat of arms of Baron Lyell
| Crest Upon a rock a dexter cubit arm erect in armour proper, charged with a cross parted and fretty gules, the hand grasping a sword in bend sinister also proper. Escutcheon Or a cross parted and fretty azure between four crosses patée gules, all within a bordure of the last. Supporters No supporters recorded at the College of Arms Motto Forti non Ignavo (To the brave, not to the dastardly). |

Peerage of the United Kingdom
| Preceded by Charles Lyell | Baron Lyell; 1943–2017; Member of the House of Lords (1960–1999) | Extinct |
Parliament of the United Kingdom
| New office created by the House of Lords Act 1999 | Elected hereditary peer to the House of Lords under the House of Lords Act 1999; 1999–2017 | Succeeded by The Lord Colgrain |
