= Charles Ross Lyall =

English cricketer and British Army officer (1880–1950)

Charles Ross Lyall (3 October 1880 – 4 June 1950) was a career soldier who played first-class cricket for Somerset in two matches in the 1911 season. He was born in Calcutta, India and died at Basingstoke, Hampshire.

== Military career ==
Lyall was an officer in the British Indian Army from 1900 to 1933. He graduated from the Royal Military College in 1900 as a "Queen's India cadet" and was placed on the unattached list as a second lieutenant on 20 January 1900. Posted to the Punjab Command three months later, he was formally transferred to the Indian Staff Corps in april 1901, and in 1902 he was promoted to full lieutenant. The only cricket played by Lyall that is recorded from this period is a single non-first-class three-day match for the North-West Frontier Province against the Punjab cricket team in late 1903, in which Lyall played as a lower order batsman.

In 1909, Lyall was promoted to captain attached to the 36th Sikhs regiment of the Indian army. In 1911, he appears to have been in England for some time during the cricket season: he played in one County Championship match against Yorkshire in May, scoring an unbeaten 21 in the first innings and 8 in the second. Two months later, he followed that with a second first-class match, this time against the touring Indian cricket team, in which he scored 15 and 11 not out. That was the extent of his first-class cricket and left him with the odd statistic of a batting average higher (at 27.50 runs per innings) than his highest score.

Lyall returned to the Indian army. In 1916, he was promoted temporarily from captain to major in the 36th Sikhs. From 18 May 1915 to 30 September 1917 he was a Recruiting Officer. He served in Mesopotamia from 14 Oct 1917 to 24 June 1918. He was appointed an instructor at the Central School of Musketry 1 April 1919 to 30 April 1921. He went on to serve in Waziristan between 1921–23 and was wounded.

In 1919, there is a report in the London Gazette of a temporary promotion from major to lieutenant-colonel for a period of six days in 1918, while he commanded a battalion of 151st Indian Infantry. In 1922, he is reported to have relinquished the rank of lieutenant-colonel at the end of a period of commanding a battalion within the 36th Sikhs.

Promoted lieutenant-colonel 5 July 1924. By 1928, he temporarily moves on to the unemployed list before being reappointed to the Indian Army in July. There was another similar temporary move into and then out of unemployed status in 1929. He was appointed the Recruiting Officer, Jullundur 28 May 1929. Finally he retired from the Indian Army in 1933.
