= Heather De Lisle =

American journalist (born 1976)

Heather Anne De Lisle (born August 17, 1976, in Landstuhl, West Germany) is an American television former presenter at the international broadcaster Deutsche Welle and a radio correspondent for ABC News.

== Life ==
De Lisle is the daughter of radio disc jockey Rik De Lisle. At the age of 15, she hosted her first radio broadcast on American Forces Network (Berlin). She studied at the University of Maryland, and attended the SRT – School for Broadcast Technology (now known as the ARD-ZDF Media Academy) in Nuremberg.

Since 1995 she has worked freelance for Deutsche Welle, first presenting the weather, then sports, and as a newsreader since 2001. Since the age of seven she has also worked as a voice actor for film, television, and computer games. She has also worked as a foreign correspondent since 2000 for ABC News Radio in New York in charge of reporting from the German capital. In film dubbing, she was a casting director at the Speaker-Search voice talent agency in Berlin from 2007 to 2008.

De Lisle is a regular guest on the German current-events show Studio Press Club and the news channel N24. A vocal conservative, she describes herself as " apparently the only American journalist in Germany who is committed to the Republican Party".

In September 2010 De Lisle published her first book, the German-language Amiland, named for a slang term for the U.S., in which she took issue with the uncritical reception given Barack Obama in Germany and defended the U.S. against various stereotypes. She lives in Berlin, is married to a German and is mother to a son.

In December 2011 De Lisle suffered a stroke, which resulted in a serious Aphasia. Since then, she has regained functional - and to a certain extent conversational - use of both English and German. De Lisle took part in a 2014 Study by Charité on regaining brain function using externally provided electrical stimulation.

== Programs ==
- DW-TV Journal – half-hour news format (in English)
- DW-TV Tomorrow Today – science magazine (in English)
- DW-TV Made in Germany – business magazine (in English)

== Edition ==
- Amiland: Eine Streitschrift für die Weltmacht USA. Tredition, Hamburg 2010; ISBN 978-3-86850-780-5
