= Las Cruces Sun-News =

Newspaper in Las Cruces, New Mexico

- Front page of Las Cruces Sun-News on July 25, 2008
- Type: Daily newspaper
- Format: Broadsheet
- Owner: USA Today Co.
- Founder: James A. Spradling
- Editor: Jessica Onsurez (2023-present)
- Founded: 1881 (as the Rio Grande Republican)
- Language: English
- Headquarters: Las Cruces, New Mexico
- Circulation: 22,646 Daily; 23,917 Sunday (as of 2011)
- ISSN: 1081-2172
- Website: lcsun-news.com

Las Cruces Sun-News, founded in 1881, is a daily newspaper published in Las Cruces, New Mexico.

== History ==
On May 21, 1881, the Rio Grande Republican was first published. It was founded by James A. Spradling. The Republican at different times was owned by H.D. Bowman and J.F Bonham. In 1911, Allen J. Papen sold the paper to Orrin A. Foster. The paper's name was soon shortened to the Rio Grande Republic.

In 1917, Mrs. Josephine Foster sold the Republic to Seymour E. Bronson and his two sons Daniel and David. The three owned The Mining Journal in Clifton, Arizona. In 1923, the Bronson family merged the Republic with Organized Farming, published by the Dona Ana County Farm Bureau, to form the Rio Grande Farmer. In 1934, the Bronsons expanded the Farmer into a daily and renamed it to the Las Cruces Daily News.

In 1937, Morris J. Boretz and Edwin D. Minteer founded a rival paper called the Las Cruces Sun. In March 1939, the Sun owners acquired the Daily News from David Bronson. The two papers were merged to form the Las Cruces Sun-News. A month later, Wallace Perry bought the paper from Boretz and Minteer. After a few days, on the day ownership was to officially be transferred, Minteer re-acquired the paper from Perry. Perry later announced he had gotten sick and reached an agreement to re-purchase the paper on a later date.

Perry owned the Sun-News for seven years. In 1946, he sold it to Orville E. Priestley and James H. Skewes, owners of the Artesia Advocate. In 1956, the two sold off the Advocate to a rival publisher. In 1958, Skewes died, and a year later his widow sold their company stock to Priestley. In 1967, Priestley died. In 1970, his widow Opal Lee Priestley sold the Sun-News to Worrell Enterprises Inc.

In 1989, Garden State Newspapers, a subsidiary of MediaNews Group, acquired the paper. At that time circulation was 20,000. The Sun-News later became part of the Texas-New Mexico Newspapers Partnership, a joint venture formed in 2003 between MediaNews Group and Gannett, with MediaNews Group the managing partner. In 2015, Gannett acquired full ownership of the Texas-New Mexico Newspapers Partnership. Since 2023, Jessica Onsurez has served as news director for Sun-News and the other Gannett-owned papers in New Mexico.
