= Quarrier =

Quarrier may refer to:

- A worker in a quarry
- Quarrier, West Virginia
- Quarriers
- William Quarrier

== See also ==
- Quarrier's Village
