= Arthur Francis Stoddard =

American-born Scottish entrepreneur (1810–1882)

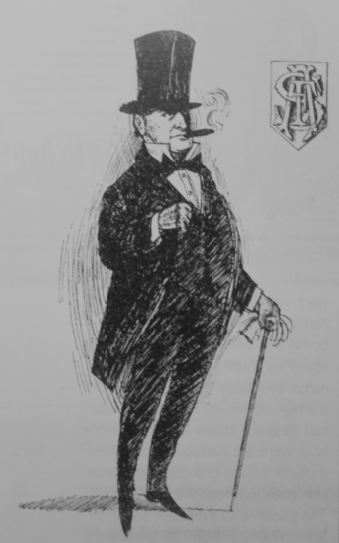
Arthur Francis Stoddard in 1876

Arthur Francis Stoddard (1810–1882) was an American-born entrepreneur and philanthropist who founded Stoddard Carpets, Scotland's largest carpet company in the 19th century and a specialist in "tapestry carpets". The company later became Stoddard International.

== Life ==
Stoddard was born on November 30, 1810, in Northampton, Massachusetts. He was the son of Solomon Stoddard Jr. and his wife, Sarah Tappan. His ancestors were of British descent and had settled in America in 1639.

He moved to New York State in 1833 to work alongside his maternal uncle, Arthur Tappan, a silk merchant. He then became a partner in the New York firm of Peter Denny Importers, and began a series of trade visits to Britain.

Following a slump in US trade in 1844, he went to Britain permanently. Although originally intending to settle in London, the voyage arrived in Greenock and he decided to stay in Paisley, Renfrewshire and worked in Glasgow as a commission agent at Princes Square. He worked for A & S Hendry.

In 1853, he moved to Elderslie, Renfrewshire where he was first introduced to carpet-making at the nearby Patrickbank Mill, owned by brothers John and Robert Roland. Their factory had previously made Paisley shawls, but they had switched to the printing of tapestry carpets in the 1850s when the fashion for shawls collapsed. In 1862 Stoddard bought the failing company and, through his business contacts, revived its profitability, with 75 percent of his trade being exported to USA contacts by 1867.

The business expanded, and in 1870 Stoddard patented an anti-moth lining. However, high import duties in the US in 1870 caused him to seek new markets in Europe.

He died in Kilmacolm on June 3, 1882, and is buried in Port Glasgow Cemetery.

In 1870 his son Frederick Stoddard and his son-in-law Charles Bine Renshaw had taken over operational control of the carpet business and Arthur stood back. The company started making carpet squares in 1895 and was one of the first to use electric power.

Stoddard's collection of carpet designs was purchased by Glasgow University.

The company latterly changed to be known as Stoddard International.

== Philanthropy ==
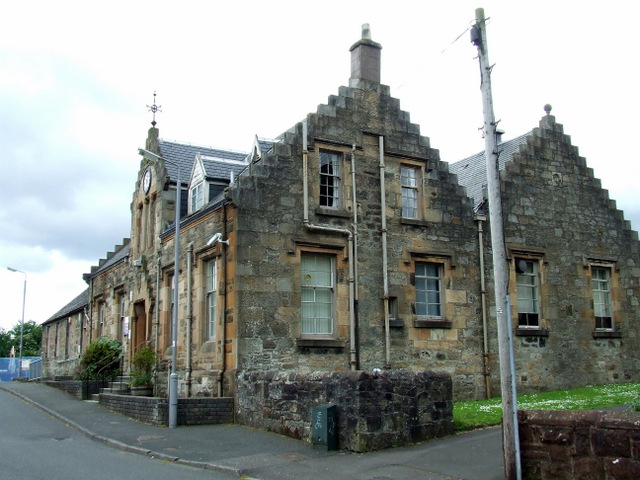
Elderslie Village Hall

Stoddard commissioned Broadfield House, a huge sprawling mansion, to be built in Port Glasgow in 1870. In 1925 this was converted into Broadfield Hospital which from 1929 was used as a mental health hospital. In 1877, Stoddard paid for Broadfield, the first building in Quarrier's Village, just west of his home. This building now stands just east of the main building.

He was a close friend of the much younger William Quarrier and was his main patron in providing facilities for the poor. Stoddard also paid for Elderslie Village Hall and Elderslie Public School.

== Family ==
On 9 September 1840 in Boston, Massachusetts he married Frances Eliza Noble (1821-1885). They had at least three sons and five daughters.
