= Robert Lyle =

Robert Lyle may refer to:

- Robert Lyle (Minnesota politician) (1808–1896), American politician
- Robert Lyle (rugby union) (1884–1968), Irish international rugby union player
- Robert Lyle, 1st Lord Lyle (died 1470)
- Robert Lyle, 2nd Lord Lyle (died 1497)
- Bobby Lyle (born 1944), American jazz musician
- Robert Lyle of the Lyle baronets

== See also ==
- Robert Lyles (born 1961), American football player
