= List of acts of the Parliament of Scotland from 1489 =

This is a list of acts of the Parliament of Scotland for the year 1489.

It lists acts of Parliament of the old Parliament of Scotland, that was merged with the old Parliament of England to form the Parliament of Great Britain, by the Union with England Act 1707 (c. 7).

For other years, see list of acts of the Parliament of Scotland. For the period after 1707, see list of acts of the Parliament of Great Britain.

== 1489 ==
=== January ===
A parliament of James IV, held on 4 July 1489.

Short title, or popular name	Citation	Royal assent
Long title
Church Act 1489 (repealed)	January 1489 c. 1 (Note: This is the citation in the Record Edition.) — (Note: This act is not listed in the Duodecimal Edition.)	4 July 1489
Of halykirk. Of the holy church. (Repealed by Statute Law Revision (Scotland) Act 1906 (6 Edw. 7. c. 38))
England Act 1489 (repealed)	January 1489 c. 2 —	4 July 1489
Of the ansuer to the king of Ingland (Note: Henry VII of England.) apon the letteris brocht fra him. Of the answer to the king of England to the letters brought from him, (Repealed by Statute Law Revision (Scotland) Act 1906 (6 Edw. 7. c. 38))
France Act 1489 (repealed)	January 1489 c. 3 —	4 July 1489
Anent the sending to the king of France (Note: Charles VIII of France.) for the renewing of the confideracioun. About the sending to the king of France for the renewing of the confederation (Repealed by Statute Law Revision (Scotland) Act 1906 (6 Edw. 7. c. 38))
Denmark Act 1489 (repealed)	January 1489 c. 4 —	4 July 1489
Anent the sending to the king of Denmark (Note: John, King of Denmark.) for the renewing of the aliancez. About the sending to the king of Denmark for the renewing of the alliance. (Repealed by Statute Law Revision (Scotland) Act 1906 (6 Edw. 7. c. 38))
Galloway Cawps Act 1489 (repealed)	January 1489 c. 5 —	4 July 1489
Tuiching the takin of cawpis usit be heddis of kyn in Galloway. Touching the taking of cawps (Note: A cawp is a gift made by a tenant.) as is the custom of the heads of kin in Galloway. (Repealed by Statute Law Revision (Scotland) Act 1906 (6 Edw. 7. c. 38))
Warden of the Marches Act 1489 (repealed)	January 1489 c. 6 —	4 July 1489
Anent the wardane of the west and middill merchis. Regarding the warden of the West and Middle Marches. (Repealed by Statute Law Revision (Scotland) Act 1906 (6 Edw. 7. c. 38))
Siege of Castles held by Rebels Act 1489 (repealed)	January 1489 c. 7 —	4 July 1489
Tuiching the assegeing of the castellis that ar haldin contrare our soverane lord. Touching the siege of castles, fortifications and houses that are held against our sovereign lord. (Repealed by Statute Law Revision (Scotland) Act 1906 (6 Edw. 7. c. 38))
King's Council Act 1489 (repealed)	January 1489 c. 8 —	4 July 1489
Of the lordis to be chosin and be of consale to oure soverane lord. Of the lords to be chosen and be of counsel to our sovereign lord. (Repealed by Statute Law Revision (Scotland) Act 1906 (6 Edw. 7. c. 38))
Money Act 1489 (repealed)	January 1489 c. 9 —	4 July 1489
Of the money. Of the money. (Repealed by Statute Law Revision (Scotland) Act 1906 (6 Edw. 7. c. 38))
Gold and Silver Coin Act 1489 (repealed)	January 1489 c. 10 —	4 July 1489
Anent the byaris and sellaris of gold and silver cunyeit. About the buying and selling of gold and silver coin. (Repealed by Statute Law Revision (Scotland) Act 1906 (6 Edw. 7. c. 38))
Rebels Act 1489 (repealed)	January 1489 c. 11 —	4 July 1489
Of a proclamacioun to be maid that anherd with rebellis. Of a proclamation to be made regarding consorting with rebels. (Repealed by Statute Law Revision (Scotland) Act 1906 (6 Edw. 7. c. 38))

=== February ===
The 2nd parliament of James IV, held in Edinburgh.

Short title, or popular name	Citation	Royal assent
Long title
Church (No. 2) Act 1489 (repealed)	February 1489 c. 1 (Note: This is the citation in the Record Edition.); 1489 c. 7 (Note: This is the citation in the Duodecimal Edition.)	3 February 1490
Of haly kirk. Of the holy church. (Repealed by Statute Law Revision (Scotland) Act 1906 (6 Edw. 7. c. 38))
Circuit Courts Act 1489 (repealed)	February 1489 c. 2 — (Note: This act is not listed in the Duodecimal Edition.)	3 February 1490
Of the Justice airis. Of the Justice ayres. (Repealed by Statute Law Revision (Scotland) Act 1906 (6 Edw. 7. c. 38))
Public Peace Act 1489 (repealed)	February 1489 c. 3; 1489 c. 8	3 February 1490
Of frendschip and concord to be maid amangis all our soverane lordis liegis. Of friendship and agreement to be made amongst all our sovereign lord's lieges. (Repealed by Statute Law Revision (Scotland) Act 1906 (6 Edw. 7. c. 38))
Supply Act 1489 (repealed)	February 1489 c. 4; 1489 c. 9	3 February 1490
Anent the inbrynging of the taxt grantit in parliament. About the introduction of the tax granted in parliament. (Repealed by Statute Law Revision (Scotland) Act 1906 (6 Edw. 7. c. 38))
Foreign Treaties Act 1489 (repealed)	February 1489 c. 5 —	3 February 1490
Tuiching the renewing of the confideracioun and aliancez of France and elekwise with Denmark and Espanye. Touching the renewal and confirmation to be made of the confederation and alliances with France and similarly with Denmark and Spain. (Repealed by Statute Law Revision (Scotland) Act 1906 (6 Edw. 7. c. 38))
Embassy to Denmark Act 1489 (repealed)	February 1489 c. 6 —	3 February 1490
Of an ambaxiat to the king of Denmark. (Note: John, King of Denmark.); Of an embassy to the king of Denmark. (Repealed by Statute Law Revision (Scotland) Act 1906 (6 Edw. 7. c. 38))
King's Revocation Act 1489 (repealed)	February 1489 c. 7; 1489 c. 10	3 February 1490
Of the kingis properte and the annullacioun of all giftis donacions &c. sen the day of his Coronacioun. Of the king's property and the annulment of all gifts, donations, etc. since the day of his Coronation. (Repealed by Statute Law Revision (Scotland) Act 1906 (6 Edw. 7. c. 38))
Duke of Ross Act 1489 (repealed)	February 1489 c. 8 —	3 February 1490
Anent the sustentacioun and governance of the Duk of Ros (Note: James Stewart, Duke of Ross.) and erle of Mer. (Note: John Stewart, Earl of Mar (died 1503).); About the maintenance and governance of the Duke of Ross and Earl of Mar. (Repealed by Statute Law Revision (Scotland) Act 1906 (6 Edw. 7. c. 38))
Truce with England Act 1489 (repealed)	February 1489 c. 9; 1489 c. 11	3 February 1490
Tuiching the observacioun of the treux takin with the king of Ingland. (Note: Henry VII of England.); Touching the observation of the truce taken with the king of England. (Repealed by Statute Law Revision (Scotland) Act 1906 (6 Edw. 7. c. 38))
Auditors of King's Accounts Act 1489 (repealed)	February 1489 c. 10 —	3 February 1490
Appoyntement of auditouris of our soverane lordis comptis. Appointment of auditors of our sovereign lord's accounts. (Repealed by Statute Law Revision (Scotland) Act 1906 (6 Edw. 7. c. 38))
Appointment of King's Privy Council Act 1489 (repealed)	February 1489 c. 11 —	3 February 1490
Electioun of certane lordis to be of oure soverane lordis secrett consale. Election of certain lords to be of our sovereign lord's secret council. (Repealed by Statute Law Revision (Scotland) Act 1906 (6 Edw. 7. c. 38))
King's Privy Council Act 1489 (repealed)	February 1489 c. 12; 1489 c. 12	3 February 1490
Of the autorite of the said Consale. Of the authority of the said Council. (Repealed by Statute Law Revision (Scotland) Act 1906 (6 Edw. 7. c. 38))
Goldsmith's Act 1489 (repealed)	February 1489 c. 13; 1489 c. 13	3 February 1490
Of goldsmythis quhilkis makkis fals mix touris of ewill metale. Of goldsmiths who make false mixtures of bad metal. (Repealed by Statute Law Revision (Scotland) Act 1906 (6 Edw. 7. c. 38))
Trade Act 1489 (repealed)	February 1489 c. 14; 1489 c. 14	3 February 1490
Anent the act (Note: Merchants Act 1466 (January c. 3)) of saling of merchandis and anent the inbringing of bulyoune. Regarding the act of sailing of merchants, and regarding the importing of bullion. (Repealed by Statute Law Revision (Scotland) Act 1906 (6 Edw. 7. c. 38))
Ferries Act 1489 (repealed)	February 1489 c. 15 —	3 February 1490
Anent the act (Note: Ferries Act 1485 (c. 13)) maid on the feriaris quhilkis takis double frauchte. About the act made for the ferrymen who take double the fare. (Repealed by Statute Law Revision (Scotland) Act 1906 (6 Edw. 7. c. 38))
Salmon Act 1489 (repealed)	February 1489 c. 16; 1489 c. 15	3 February 1490
Anent cruvis and fisch yardis. Regarding the cruives and fish yairs. (Repealed by Statute Law Revision (Scotland) Act 1906 (6 Edw. 7. c. 38))
Free Tenants Act 1489 (repealed)	February 1489 c. 17; 1489 c. 16	3 February 1490
Concernyng the fre tennentis that haldis of the prince (Note: James IV of Scotland) duk of Rothissay and stewart of Scotland. Concerning the free tenants held from the prince, duke of Rothesay and steward of Scotland. (Repealed by Statute Law Revision (Scotland) Act 1906 (6 Edw. 7. c. 38))
Money (No. 2) Act 1489 (repealed)	February 1489 c. 18; 1489 c. 17	3 February 1490
Anent the money. About the money. (Repealed by Statute Law Revision (Scotland) Act 1906 (6 Edw. 7. c. 38))
Galloway Cawps (No. 2) Act 1489 (repealed)	February 1489 c. 19; 1489 c. 18	3 February 1490
The taking of cawpis be the heddis of kyn in Galloway to be sessit. The taking of cawps (Note: A cawp is a gift made by a tenant.) by the heads of kin in Galloway to be stopped. (Repealed by Statute Law Revision (Scotland) Act 1906 (6 Edw. 7. c. 38))
Carrick Cawps Act 1489 (repealed)	February 1489 c. 20; 1489 c. 19	3 February 1490
Tuiching the cawpis taking in Carrik. Touching the taking of cawps in Carrick. (Repealed by Statute Law Revision (Scotland) Act 1906 (6 Edw. 7. c. 38))
Annual Rents in Burghs Act 1489 (repealed)	February 1489 c. 21; 1489 c. 20	3 February 1490
Anent the proces of the recovering of annuale rentis in burrowis. Regarding the process of the recovering of annual rents in burghs. (Repealed by Statute Law Revision (Scotland) Act 1906 (6 Edw. 7. c. 38))
King's Tenants Act 1489 (repealed)	February 1489 c. 22; 1489 c. 21	3 February 1490
Againis thaim that compellis the kingis tennentis to do thaim ony maner of service. Against those that compel the king's tenants to do them any manner of service. (Repealed by Statute Law Revision (Scotland) Act 1906 (6 Edw. 7. c. 38))
Castle Campbell Act 1489 Not public and general	February 1489 c. 23 —	3 February 1490
The castell callit the Gloume to be callit in tyme tocum Campbele. The castle called the Gloume to be called Campbell in the future.
Not public and general	February 1489 c. 24 —	3 February 1490
The place callit of before Halkirstoun to be callit the Temple. The place previously called Halkerston to be called the Temple.
King's Revocation (No. 2) Act 1489 (repealed)	February 1489 c. 25; 1489 c. 22	3 February 1490
Anent the act (Note: King's Revocation Act 1488 (October c. 19)) annulling alienacions of landis &c. be our soverane lordis faider. Regarding the act annulling alienations of lands etc. by our sovereign lord's father. (Repealed by Statute Law Revision (Scotland) Act 1906 (6 Edw. 7. c. 38))
Dumbarton Castle Act 1489 (repealed)	February 1489 c. 26 —	3 February 1490
The remit of thame that tuk parte with Robert lord Lile (Note: Robert Lyle, 2nd Lord Lyle.) and Matho Stewart (Note: Matthew Stewart, 2nd Earl of Lennox.) in the halding of the castell of Dunbertane. The release of those that took part with Robert, lord Lyle, and Matthew Stewart in holding Dumbarton Castle. (Repealed by Statute Law Revision (Scotland) Act 1906 (6 Edw. 7. c. 38))
Administration of Justice Act 1489 (repealed)	February 1489 c. 27 —	3 February 1490
Of the sitting of the lordis Auditouris of complantis with the lordis of Consale. Of the sitting of the lords Auditors of complaints with the lords of council. (Repealed by Statute Law Revision (Scotland) Act 1906 (6 Edw. 7. c. 38))

=== Sources ===
- Alexander, William (1841). "Acta Parliamentorum Regis Jacobi Quarti". An Abridgement of the Acts of the Parliaments of Scotland. Edinburgh: Adam and Charles Black. p. 447 – via Google Books.
- Alexander, William (1841). "Acta Parliamentorum Regis Jacobi Quarti". An Abridgement of the Acts of the Parliaments of Scotland. Edinburgh: Adam and Charles Black. p. 447 – via Google Books.
- Chronological Table of the Statutes. London: Her Majesty's Stationery Office. 1972. pp. 1324–1325 – via Google Books.
- "Index of Statutes: James IV (1488-1513)". Records of the Parliaments of Scotland to 1707. University of St Andrews.

== See also ==
- List of legislation in the United Kingdom
- Records of the Parliaments of Scotland
