= Lord Lyle =

The title Lord Lyle was a Lordship of Parliament in the Peerage of Scotland created for Sir Robert Lyle of Duchal, a Renfrewshire knight c. 1452. The title became extinct upon the death of the 4th Lord Lyle c. 1551.

== Lords Lyle ==
- Robert Lyle, 1st Lord Lyle (d.c. 1470)
- Robert Lyle, 2nd Lord Lyle (d.c. 1492), Lord Chief Justice
- Robert Lyle, 3rd Lord Lyle (d.c. 1500). According to a biography of the Lords Lyle, "The history of the third Lord Lyle is very scanty, and his life does not seem to have been very eventful."
- John Lyle, 4th Lord Lyle (d.c. 1551)
