= Quarriers =

Scottish social care charity

- Quarriers logo
- Formation: Late 19th century
- Founder: William Quarrier
- Founded at: Quarrier's Village
- Type: Charity
- Legal status: Operational
- Purpose: Social care
- Headquarters: Quarrier's Village, Remfewshire
- Region served: Scotland
- Services: Care and support for people with a disability, children and families, young people, young homeless people, people with epilepsy and carers
- Board Chair: Alan Frizzell
- CEO: Dr Ronald Culley
- Staff: 2,000+
- Website: quarriers.org.uk

Quarriers is a Scottish social care charity based in Quarrier's Village, Inverclyde. It provides care and support for people with a disability, children and families, young people, young homeless people, people with epilepsy, and carers. In February 2008 Quarriers was the largest non-church social care charity in Scotland.

The charity was founded in the late 19th century by William Quarrier, a shoe retailer from Glasgow. In the 1890s he built the Orphan Homes of Scotland in Bridge of Weir, which were home to up to 1500 children at a time.

Changes in UK childcare practice and legislation in the 1970s and 80s led to a modernisation process, through which the organisation developed the services it delivers today and became known as Quarriers.

Quarriers' work covers the whole of Scotland and the organisation is also involved in several international projects.

== History ==
=== 19th Century ===
The charity was founded in the late 19th century by the philanthropist William Quarrier, a shoe retailer from Glasgow. Quarrier began looking after homeless children in the 1870s, opening a night refuge for homeless children in Renfrew Street, Glasgow in 1871.

He then expanded his operations, using charitable donations to buy a piece of land near the Bridge of Weir, on which the Orphan Homes of Scotland were built. Both the village, originally founded as the Orphan Homes of Scotland in 1876, and the orphanage homes relating to him were part of William Quarrier's Christian vision of helping the less fortunate. The village was built on the former Nittingshill Farm. By the 1890s this included 34 cottages, a school, a church, and a fire station – a complete working village that became known, and is still known, as Quarrier's Village.

More than 800 children at a time lived at Quarrier's Village during the 1890s and as the charity expanded, up to 1500 children were accommodated at a time. In total more than 30,000 children have been cared for at Quarrier's Village.

=== 20th century ===
The organisation adapted to changes in British childcare practice and legislation in the 1970s and 80s, modernized its services, and changed its name to "Quarriers".

=== 21st century ===
In 2004, Quarriers won both 'Fundraiser of the Year' and the Communications Award from the Institute of Fundraising Scotland.

==== Quarriers Homes, Inverclyde ====
In 2020 the Scottish Child Abuse Inquiry issued a report which included Quarriers Homes. The report concluded that children in the care of these institutions suffered physical, emotional, and sexual abuse, "scant regard was paid to their dignity." and that they lived in "harsh, rigid regimes.".

The chief executive of Quarriers, Alice Harper, apologized for their former policy of sending children abroad and said it was both "misguided and wrong." She also said, "Vulnerable children were sent away and we recognize that some also suffered physical and emotional abuse, including sexual abuse."

=== Emigration programme ===
From 1872 to 1938, the Orphan Homes of Scotland participated in an overseas emigration program that sent more than 7,000 young people primarily to Canada and some to Australia.

The homes were listed as the Orphan and Destitute Children's Emigration Homes in 1872 and had close connections with their receiving center, Fairknowe, in Brockville, Ontario. Quarriers apologized for this practice in 2019, acknowledging that while the scheme was seen to have "offered the chance of a better life", "it was misguided and wrong". The charity further acknowledged that several children had suffered cruelty and abuse.

== Current operations ==
Quarriers is still based at Quarrier's Village in the civil parish of Kilmacolm, Inverclyde. Its services now cover the whole of Scotland.

In February 2008 Quarriers was the largest non-church social care charity in Scotland, as measured by annual income.

The charity provides care and support services for:

- Adults and children with a disability – through respite care, supporting people to live independently, support for people with learning difficulties and work placements.
- Children and families – through its family centres that provide information and support, drop-in services, health promotion and nursery and childcare facilities.
- Young people – through its residential school in Ardrossan, Ayrshire and other projects to help children re-integrate into mainstream schools.
- Young homeless people – through supported accommodation and outreach services.
- People with epilepsy – through its own National Epilepsy Assessment Centre and Epilepsy Fieldwork service. In 2008 the National Epilepsy Assessment Centre was awarded the European Foundation for Quality Management (EFQM) Committed to Excellence award.
- Carers – through Quarriers Carers Centres that offer information and advice, emotional support, support groups and help with financial issues.

The charity is also involved in several international projects, including the Taganka Children's Fund in Russia and Saathi, an organisation supporting women and children across Nepal.

In 2004, Quarriers won both 'Fundraiser of the Year' and the Communications Award from the Institute of Fundraising Scotland.

== See also ==
- Social care in Scotland
