= Duchal Castle =

- Kilmacolm, Inverclyde, Scotland; UK grid reference NS334685
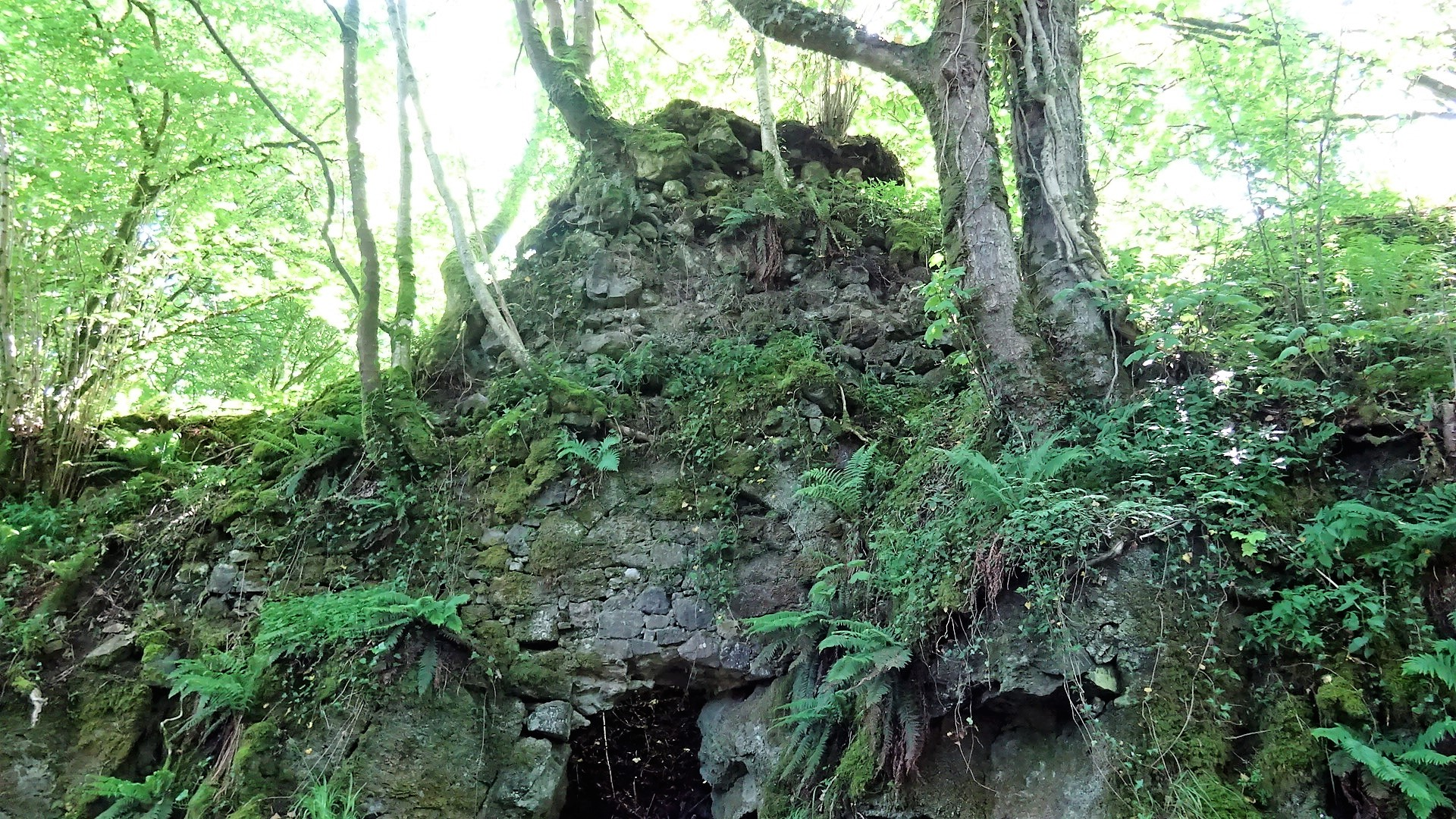
- Remnants of the castle's keep from the courtyard

Site information
- Type: A courtyard castle and motte
- Open to the public: No
- Condition: A ruin

Location
- Duchal Castle
- Location within Scotland
- Coordinates: 55.8809°N 4.6641°W

Site history
- Built: 13th century
- Built by: de Lyle
- In use: 13th to early 18th century
- Materials: Stone

The ruins of the large courtyard style Duchal Castle lie circa 1.5 miles south-west of Kilmacolm in the Inverclyde council area and the historic county of Renfrewshire in the west central Lowlands of Scotland. The castle stands at the bottom of the valley of the River Gryfe on a peninsula created by the Blacketty and Green Waters which have their confluence beyond the two deep gorges.

== History ==
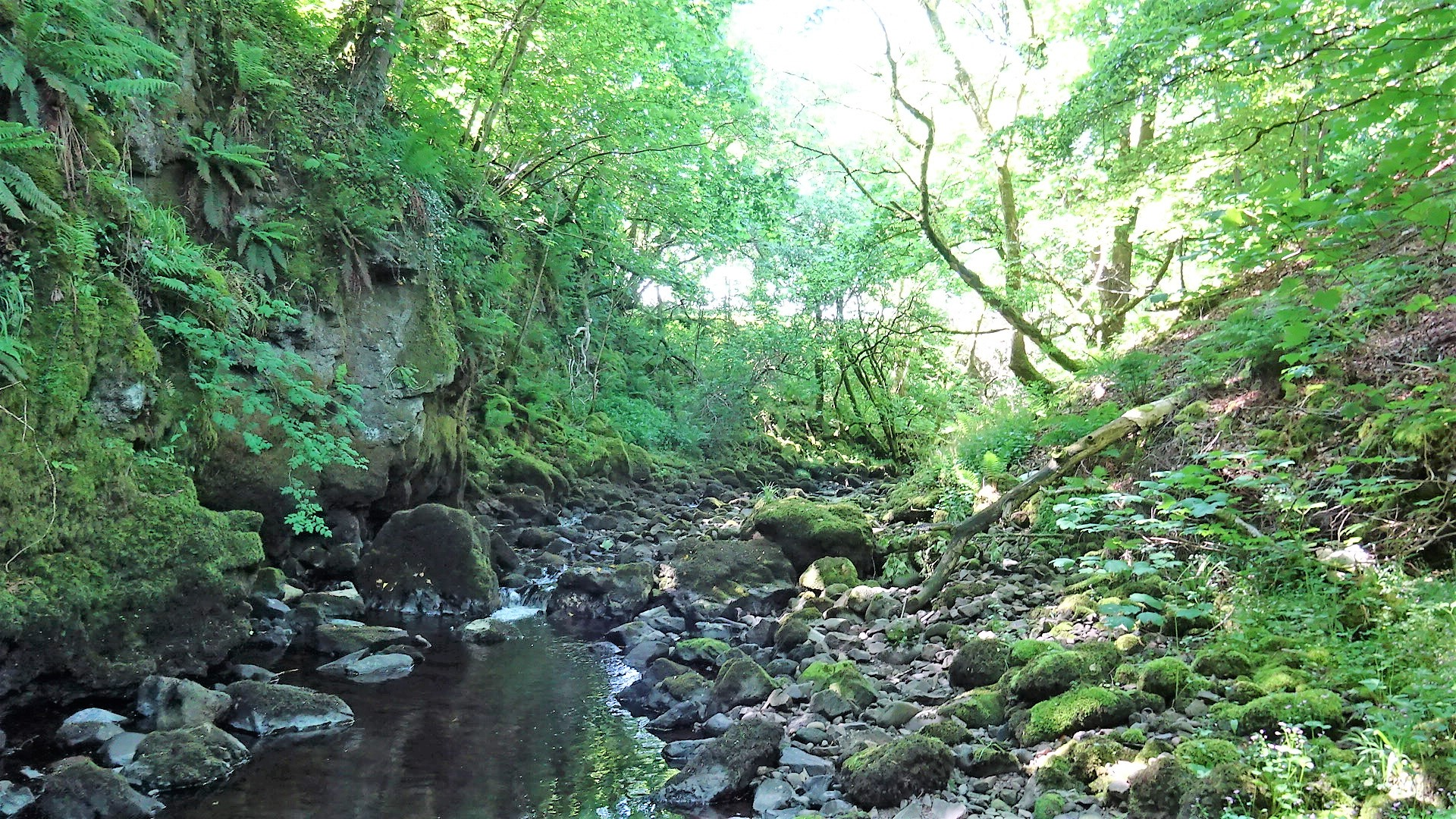
The gorge of the Burnbank Burn.

The castle was held from the 12th century by the Lyle, L'Isle, Lyell or Insula family. It seems unlikely that they were of the same Lisle family which had first settled in Northumberland. Ralph de Insula of Duchal is recorded in the reign of Alexander II (1198 – 1249) and he may have built the first castle here. In the mid 15th century Lord Lyle was ennobled by James II and a successor, Sir Robert Lyle became Lord Chief Justice and a Privy Councillor to James III. Lord Lyle had died in 1470 and his heiress had married Alexander Lyle of Craigbate. In 1513 James IV and his natural son James (see below), Archbishop of St Andrews, both died at the Battle of Flodden.

The title of Lord Lyle passed to the descendants of Sir Neil Montgomerie of Lainshaw near Stewarton who had married Jean, daughter of the 4th Lord Lyle.

Evidence of the old feudal baronial court is to be found in the place name 'Moothill' located near East Green in John Thomson's Atlas of Scotland, 1832. The name 'Duchal' is often written as 'Duchall' on old maps, etc.

=== Siege and later history ===
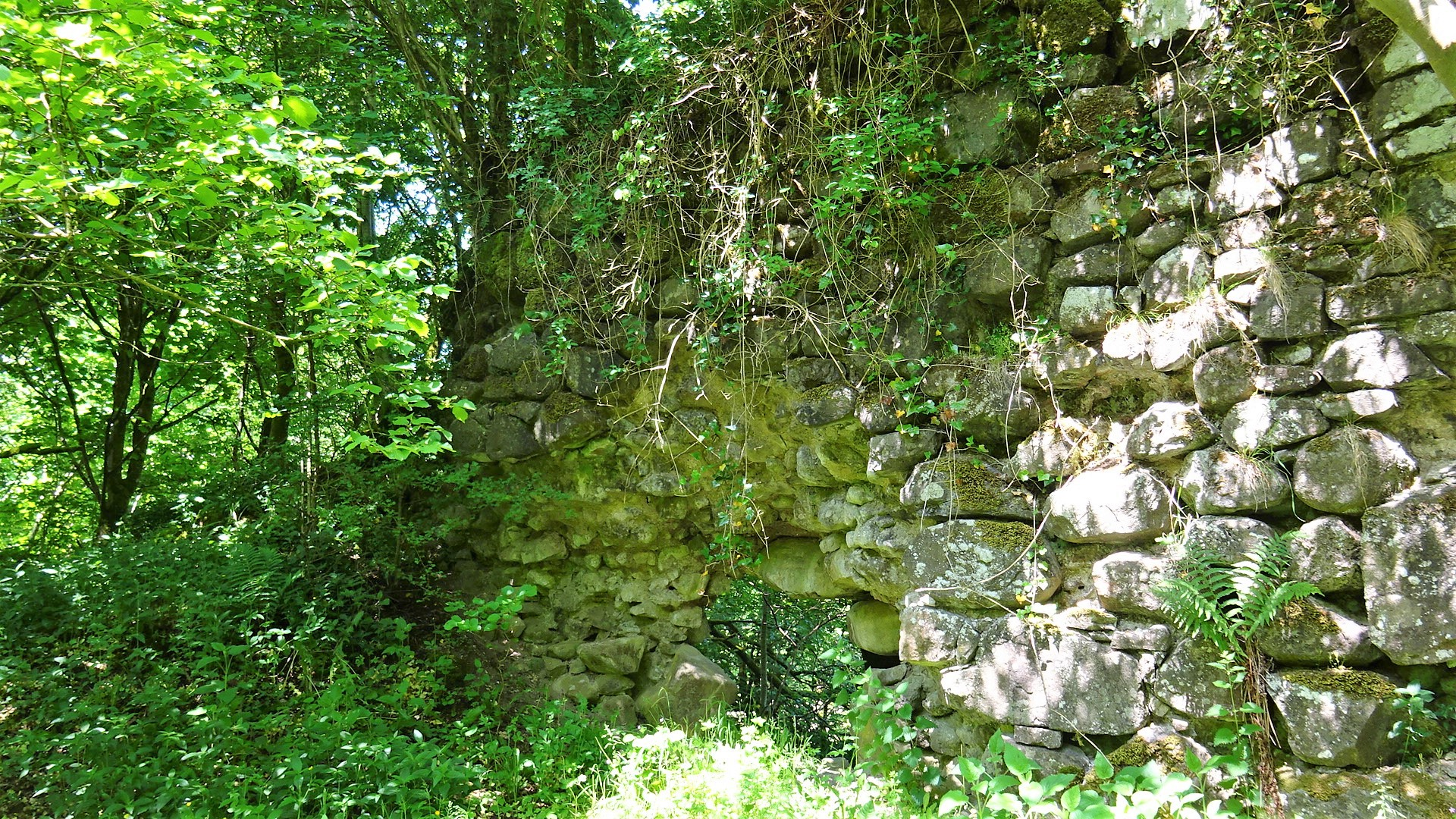
A section of the curtain wall on the Green Water side.

Robert Lyle, 2nd Lord Lyle fought against the king at the Battle of Sauchieburn in 1488 and in 1489 he supported the Lennox rebellion resulting in James IV besieging Duchal, which had been garrisoned by the Earl of Lennox in 1488, local tradition holding that Mons Meg was used as had been the case at Crookston Castle and Dumbarton Castle. A second cannon was also employed and this became known as 'Duchal'. The king himself attended the siege at some point and nine Dutch pirates are known to have volunteered as an alternative to hanging. The sheriffs had to provide oxen to haul the guns to Duchal and the king obtained at Paisley who came to the castle with mattocks and spades. The siege only lasted a few days.

The lands of Duchal were forfeited, the castle was repaired and held for a time by Robert Cunningham, 2nd Lord Kilmaurs and later 2nd Earl of Glencairn, however Sir Robert managed to return to the king's favour and even became Lord Chief Justice for a second time in 1492.

In 1544 Duchal Castle passed to the John Porterfield of Porterfield by purchase on the death of John de Lyle, 3rd Lord Lyle. Jean Knox of Ranfurly, retired to their old seat of Porterfield in 1575 upon her husband's death and subsequently the family used the property as a dower house. Duchal passed to Lord Melfort by Crown grant however it was returned to the Porterfields of that Ilk.

In 1578 Duchal was attacked and burnt as part of a family feud by James Cunningham, Master of Glencairn (later the 7th Earl of Glencairn), attacked and burnt down Duchal Castle as part of a feud between the Cunninghams and the Porterfields. The damage appears to have been repaired as the castle remained in use for some time afterwards.

Duchal Castle in 1701 is recorded as partly ruinous and Catherine Boyd, wife of Alexander Porterfield is said to have built Duchal House as his wife, daughter of the Earl of Kilmarnock, regarded the old castle in its wooded location to be cold, damp and unsuited to comfortable living. Duchal had been reduced to a substantial ruin by 1782 however the castle's draw well (slop shute or garderobe) and drawbridge survived.

The castle gradually declined in importance until the family started afresh at the site of 'New Duchal'. A substantial number of human bones are recorded to have been found in an upper apartment during the dismantling of the now abandoned fortifications. A summerhouse was built on the River Gryfe using stones recycled from the old fortifications and the remains of a rectangular building between the inner and outer bailey may be the remains of this building.

== Marion Boyd and Alexander Stewart ==
James IV kept and often visited one of his mistresses, Marion Boyd of Bonshaw at Duchal, having a son, Alexander Stewart with her, born in 1497 at the castle. On a visit here from Glasgow on 22 February 1497 the king commanded that money be left for Marion and his baby son giving eighteen shillings "to the noris that fosterit Marioun Boydis barne and fourteen to a harper." She later married John Mure of Rowallan Castle. The King celebrated his twenty-fifth birthday at Duchal on 17 March 1498 and enacted a Deed or Revocation here.

== Description ==
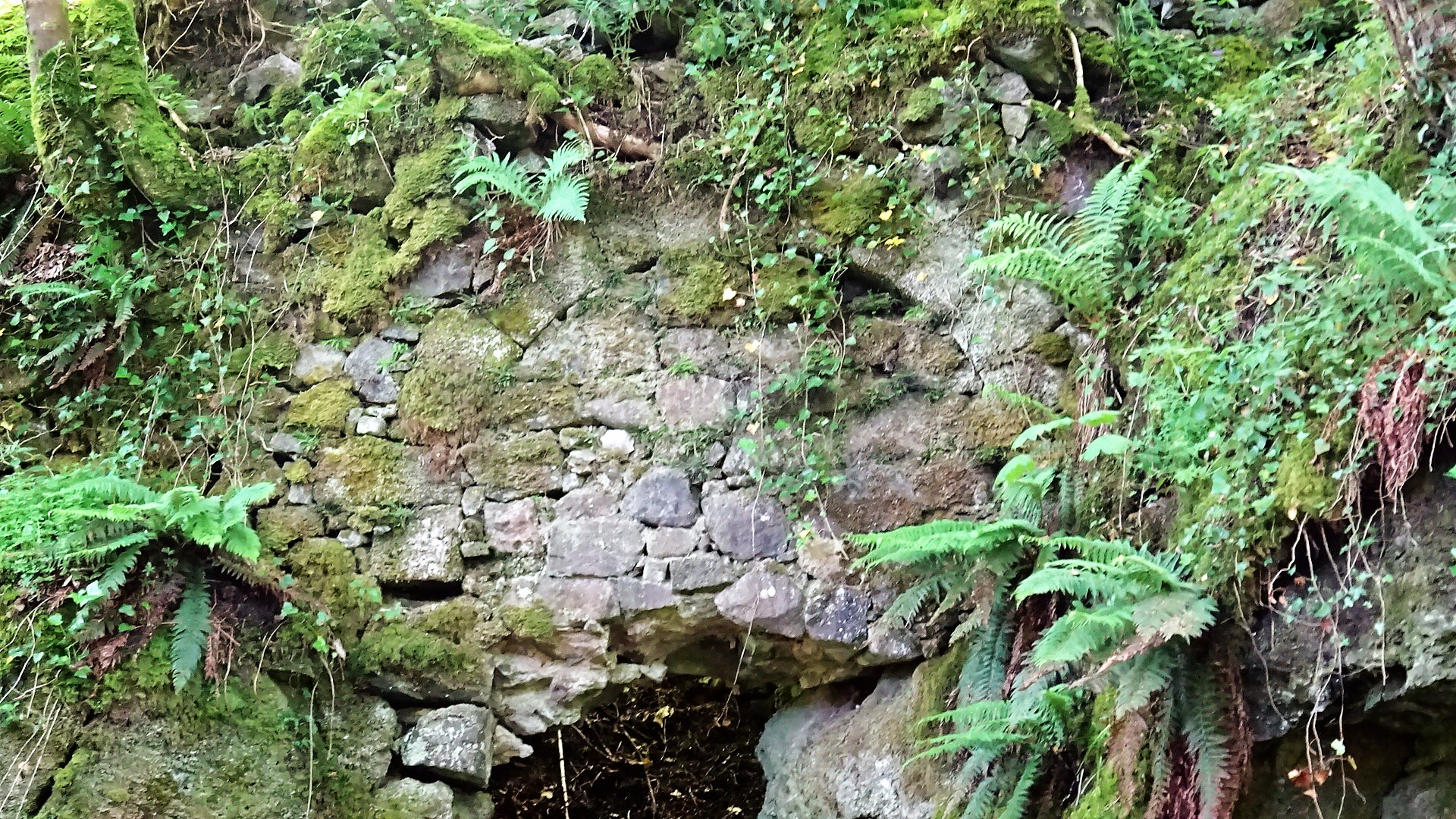
The well/slop shute/garderobe/postern gate from the Green Water Gorge.

The castle's curtain walls follow much of the edge of the raised peninsula with its continuous precipitous and mainly vertical drop into the rivulets on either side. The courtyard is fairly level and was divided into an inner and outer bailey. At the western end of the site a deep ditch crossed by a drawbridge with a gatehouse helped defend the ground level access off what is now a narrow country lane, some traces of this ditch survive. On the north-eastern side is a prominent stone lined well (take care if visiting), slop shoot or garderobe gives access to the Burnbank Burn gorge and shows evidence of having been reduced in size as some stage for defensive reasons (See photograph). This feature may have once been a postern gate with steps down. Two or possibly three 16th-century wide-mouthed gun loops can still be seen in the courtyard wall. The thickness of these curtain walls suggests a 13th-century date.

On the south-eastern side, overlooking the deep Blacketty Burn gorge, is a rocky outcrop that stands circa 20 ft above the courtyard floor with visible masonry foundations and this was the site of the keep, possibly a later structure of 14th or 15th century date, however too little remains to validate this. The main entrance and gatehouse was at the north-western angle and two postern gates also existed, one at the northern end that was accessed via steps from the courtyard and the other at the eastern end leading to the end of the peninsula. At the north-west are the likely remains of a window associated with a lean to structure. The name 'Duchal' imay translate as 'Two Rivers'.

== The Covenant ==
The Porterfields were supporters of the Covenanters and eventually suffered by forfeiture and imprisonment in 1684, the laird becoming known as Melfort's Martyr. Lord Melfort had pursued the case against the Porterfields with great vigour and he was granted the family estates which he held for a short time before they were returned and he fled the country. Before 'Duchal' was arrested and tried an incident took place where two of Melfort's spies came to Duchal and pretended to be fellow Covenanters in need of food and shelter which they were duly given, however Lady Duchal suspected them and had them watched, upon which it was observed that they did not say grace before eating. Lady Duchal informed her husband who had them seized, bound and severely whipped before placing them in an old vault where they lay until an officer collected them.

== Duchal House ==
Duchal House was built to the east of the castle (NS353680) by the Porterfields in 1710 and as was the custom much of the carved stone, etc. was robbed and used in the new building. Duchal House is still occupied and despite various additions the present structure may incorporate part of the 1710 building.
