= Windy Hill, Kilmacolm =

Windy Hill
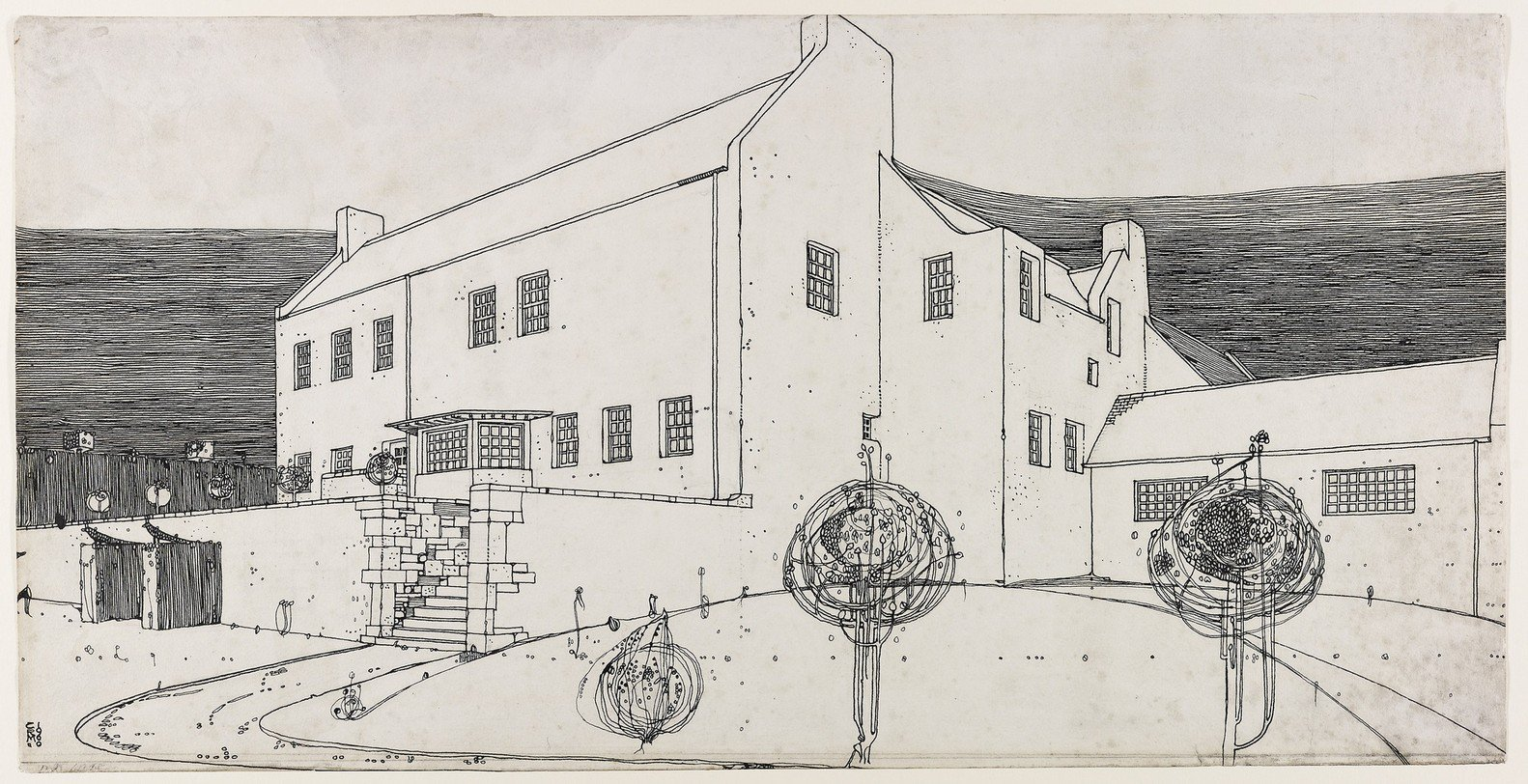
- Mackintosh's design for Windy Hill
- Interactive map of the Windy Hill area
- Alternative names: Windyhill

General information
- Status: Extant
- Type: House
- Architectural style: Art Nouveau
- Location: Rowantreehill Road, Kilmacolm, Scotland
- Coordinates: 55.890101°N 4.620414°W
- Construction started: 1900
- Completed: 1901
- Client: William Davidson

Design and construction
- Architect: Charles Rennie Mackintosh
- Designations: Category A listed

Windy Hill or Windyhill is a house designed by Charles Rennie Mackintosh and furnished by him and his wife, Margaret Macdonald, in Kilmacolm, Scotland. It is Category A listed and remains as a home in private ownership. Windy Hill is also the name of a hill in the Clyde Muirshiel Regional Park which borders Kilmacolm.

== History ==
The house was commissioned in 1900 by William Davidson, a provisions merchant, who was Mackintosh's friend and patron. Mackintosh not only designed the Art Nouveau-style house, but also, with Macdonald, its decor, furniture and fittings, including fireplaces, panelling, stained glass and lights. They also designed the 2 acres (0.81 ha) garden. The house was completed and occupied in 1901. Job books and correspondence relating to the commission are held at the Hunterian Museum, Glasgow, who have made digital scans available online.

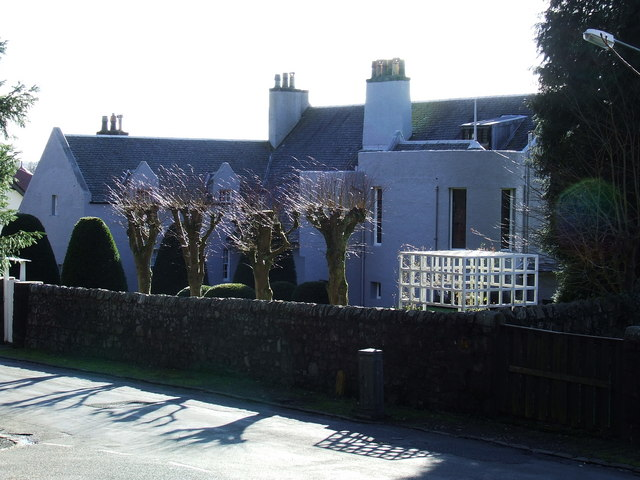
'Windy Hill' from Rowantreehill Road in 2007.

Walter Blackie and his wife viewed the house, with Mackintosh, before commissioning him to design Hill House.

The Davidson family lived in Windy Hill until 1911 when they moved back to Glasgow so William could be closer to his work. The house was then rented out, until 1934 when Davidson sold it.

== Design ==
The house consists of two floors in an L-shape arranged in two distinct volumes. The larger volume comprises a long hallway with three family rooms leading off of it on the ground floor, with five bedrooms on the upper floor. The second volume contains service rooms like the kitchen and laundry situated at the end of the previously mentioned hallway, with housemaid and servant bedrooms above it.

The exterior is harling with a smooth uniform appearance with small deep-set windows. The Davidson's son Hamish wrote in article for The Scottish Art Review that fellow passengers on his father's daily train commute compared the design of his house to "a barracks or a prison".

== Ownership ==
In 2014, the house's fifth owner, David Cairns, who had painstakingly sourced craftspeople to authentically restore it, placed it on the market for an estimated £3 million. After it initially failed to sell, there were calls to buy it for the nation, to ensure its preservation. As of 2022, the property had been removed from the market.
