= Robert Lyle, 1st Lord Lyle =

Robert Lyle (died 1470) was the First Lord Lyle of Duchal in Renfrewshire. He became a lord around 1438. On July 18, 1452, he witnessed a charter by James II. He took his first seat in Parliament in 1454. In 1464–1465, Lord Lyle was one of the attendants on King James III. For his service, the King granted Lord Lyle a manor, as well as lands in Renfrew.

Lord Robert Lyle was married at least twice. His first marriage was to Margaret, daughter of Andrew, first Lord Gray and likely occurred prior to 1445. The second legal marriage was to Margaret Wallace, with whom he had a son, Robert, and a daughter, Elizabeth, who later married John Stewart of Blackhall.

Peerage of Scotland
New creation	Lord Lyle; 1452–1470	Succeeded by Robert Lyle
