= William Quarrier =

Scottish philanthropist

- Born: 29 September 1829; Greenock, Inverclyde, Scotland
- Died: 16 October 1903 (aged 74)
- Occupation: Shoe retailer
- Known for: Philanthropy

William Quarrier (29 September 1829 – 16 October 1903) was a shoe retailer and philanthropist from Glasgow, Scotland. He was founder of the Orphan Homes of Scotland in Renfrewshire, which later evolved into the social care charity Quarriers.

== Life ==
Quarrier was born in Greenock on 29 September 1829, but moved to Glasgow aged three following the death of his father and spent most of his childhood in poverty. Reflecting on his charitable acts in 1872, he accredited his philanthropy largely to these experiences:

"When a little boy, I stood in the High Street of Glasgow, barefoot, bareheaded, cold and hungry, having tasted no food for a day and a half, and, as I gazed at each passer-by, wondering why they did not help such as I, a thought passed through my mind that I would not do as they when I would get the means to help others"

At 17 he began work as a shoemaker after training as an apprentice. At this stage, he became a devout Christian. Quarrier attended Blackfriars Street Church and later Adelaide Place Baptist Church, where he served as a deacon. He soon owned a chain of shops and married Isabella Hunter, the daughter of his first employer. Quarrier fathered four children: Isabella, Agnes, Frank and Mary Quarrier.

== Charitable work ==
Quarrier is best known for his charitable work. In 1871 he opened a night refuge for homeless children in Renfrew Street, Glasgow.

Then in 1876, using charitable donations, mainly from his rich friend Arthur Francis Stoddard owner of Stoddard Carpets International Quarrier began to build the Orphan Homes of Scotland on a piece of land now in Inverclyde and between the villages of Kilmacolm and Bridge of Weir, falling within the civil parish of the former. The first block was called Broadfield after Stoddard's estate in Port Glasgow.

By the 1890s 'Quarrier's Village', as it is now known, was home to 34 cottages, a school, a church and a fire station. The village was home to up to 1,500 children at a time. Children in need could be housed in conditions close to a home environment. Each cottage housed up to thirty children under the care of a "father and mother". Children were taught self-reliance and were well educated in the village school.

== Child migration ==
From 1870 to 1936 the Orphan Homes of Scotland founded by William Quarrier participated in the British child relocation program sending more than 7,000 young people to Canada where they were employed, as farm labourers.

== Death and legacy ==
William Quarrier died on 16 October 1903. He is buried alongside his wife in the Mount Zion Church cemetery at Quarrier's Village.

His work continues through the social care charity Quarriers, which is still based at Quarriers Village.

== See also ==
- Quarriers
- Quarrier's Village
