= Robert Lyle, 2nd Lord Lyle =

Scottish nobleman (died 1497)

Robert Lyle, 2nd Lord Lyle (died 1497) was a Scottish nobleman from Duchal Castle in Renfrewshire. He was at one point a loyal supporter of King James III and served as an ambassador to England in the 1470s and 1480s. During his service, Lord Lyle negotiated various treaties with England, including a three-year truce.

In 1482, after a series of disagreements, Robert was accused of plotting high treason against the King, James III. He was found not guilty and honorably acquitted. In 1485, after James III repeatedly enraged the nobles, Robert Lord Lyle joined several other peers in a confederacy to depose the king. Robert is thought to have been present at the 1488 Battle of Sauchieburn, when James III was killed.

Robert Lord Lyle was appointed one of the commissioners at the opening of the Scottish Parliament in 1488. He was an auditor and examiner during the inventory of King James III's property.

In 1489, Robert and the Earl of Lennox started a rebellion against King James IV. Lyle's Duchal Castle was eventually besieged for a week, with the famous cannon Mons Meg part of the King's armament. The short-lived rebellion failed and Robert surrendered. James IV bore no grudge toward Robert Lord Lyle and appointed Robert ambassador to England, as well as to the position of Chief Justiciar of Scotland.

Robert Lord Lyle married at least twice. His second marriage, to Margaret Houston, produced eight children: Robert (the third Lord Lyle), George, Nicol, John, Margaret, Jonet, Marion, and Agnes.

Peerage of Scotland
Preceded by Robert Lyle	Lord Lyle; 1470–1497	Succeeded by Robert Lyle
