= Quarrier's Village =

Coordinates: 55.86833°N 4.61666°W

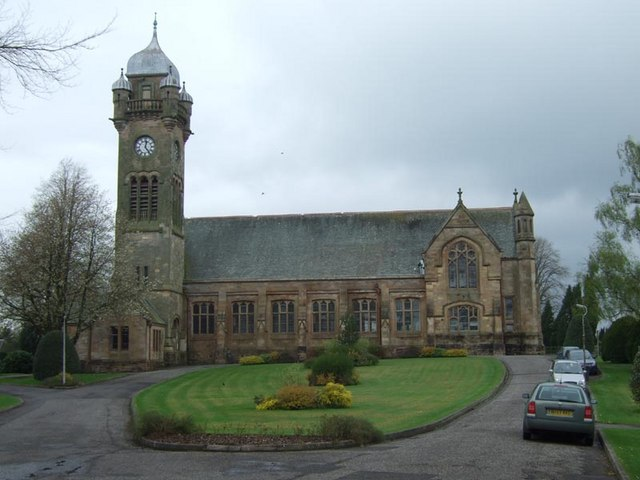
- Mount Zion Church

- Location within Inverclyde
- Population: 710 (2020)
- OS grid reference: NS362866
  - Edinburgh: 55 mi (89 km)
  - London: 354 mi (570 km)
- Civil parish: Kilmacolm
- Council area: Inverclyde
- Lieutenancy area: Renfrewshire
- Country: Scotland
- Sovereign state: United Kingdom
- Post town: BRIDGE OF WEIR
- Postcode district: PA11
- Dialling code: 01505
- Police: Scotland
- Fire: Scottish
- Ambulance: Scottish
- UK Parliament: Inverclyde
- Scottish Parliament: Renfrewshire North and West

Quarrier's Village or Quarriers Village is a small settlement in the civil parish of Kilmacolm in Inverclyde council area and the historic county of Renfrewshire, in the west Central Lowlands of Scotland. It lies within the Gryffe Valley between the villages of Kilmacolm and Bridge of Weir, falling on the boundary between the modern Inverclyde and Renfrewshire council areas.

Now a residential commuter village, Quarrier's was constructed as the Orphans Homes of Scotland in the late 19th century by philanthropist William Quarrier. In modern times, these orphans' homes and associated buildings have been converted into private housing and some expansion has taken place with new residential development. A charity under the name of Quarriers continues the work of the former homes and is based within the village.

== History ==
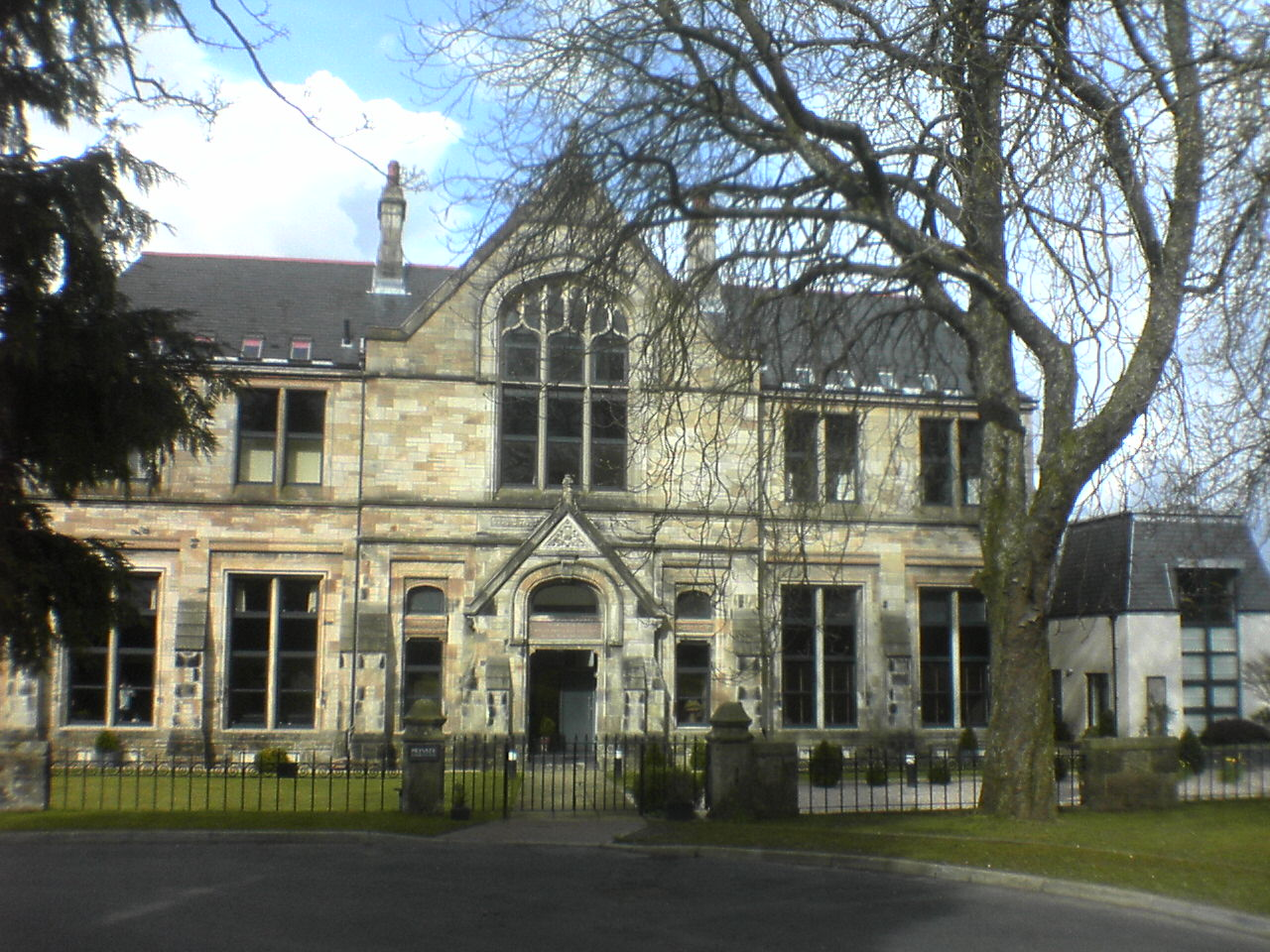
The Old Schoolhouse

The village was founded as the Orphan Homes of Scotland in 1876 by Glasgow shoe-maker and philanthropist William Quarrier on the site of the former Nittingshill Farm. Quarrier had a vision of a community allowing the young people in his care to thrive, set in a countryside environment and housed in a number of grand residences under a house-mother and father. This vision was realised by a number of donations from Quarrier and his friends.

A devout Christian, Quarrier's homes also had a distinct religious ethos. He commissioned the building of Mount Zion Church – known informally as the Children's Cathedral – and his values are also reflected in the naming of streets in the village, such as Faith Avenue, Hope Avenue, Love Avenue, Praise Avenue and Peace Avenue. In 2006, Mount Zion Church decided it could no longer justify such a large premises and moved to one of the nearby homes. The church itself has been converted into private dwellings after the initial rejection of planning permission by the local authority was successfully appealed by the developer to the Scottish Ministers.

Until 1999, it was also the site of the Bridge of Weir Hospital, opened as a tuberculosis sanatorium. The main section of the hospital has now been converted into residential flats. Hunter House, also commissioned by Quarrier and completed three years after his death, served as Scotland's only residential epilepsy assessment centre until the facility moved to The William Quarrier Scottish Epilepsy Centre, which opened in Glasgow in 2013.

Quarriers is a registered charity and still functions to help disadvantaged young people, carers and adults with disabilities in the United Kingdom and beyond. However, due to the changing nature of childcare, the number of children being cared for in the village fell dramatically in the 1970s and 1980s, and most of the homes were sold off privately. The village now attracts a number of tourists.

Greenock Morton Football Club used to train in the village between 2004 and 2013.

== Geography ==
Quarrier's Village lies within the moorland of the Gryffe Valley immediately south of the River Gryffe. The settlement is bisected by the Gotter Water, a tributary of the Gryffe, with the majority of the village standing on its north bank. A number of both vehicle and footbridges cross the Gotter Water within the village whilst the Gryffe is crossed by a road bridge, Craigends Bridge, at the edge of the settlement, and a two pedestrian bridges. One of these footbridges over the Gryffe links the community with the Forth to Clyde cycle route (National Cycle Route 75), which was formerly the line of the Greenock and Ayrshire Railway.

== Architecture ==
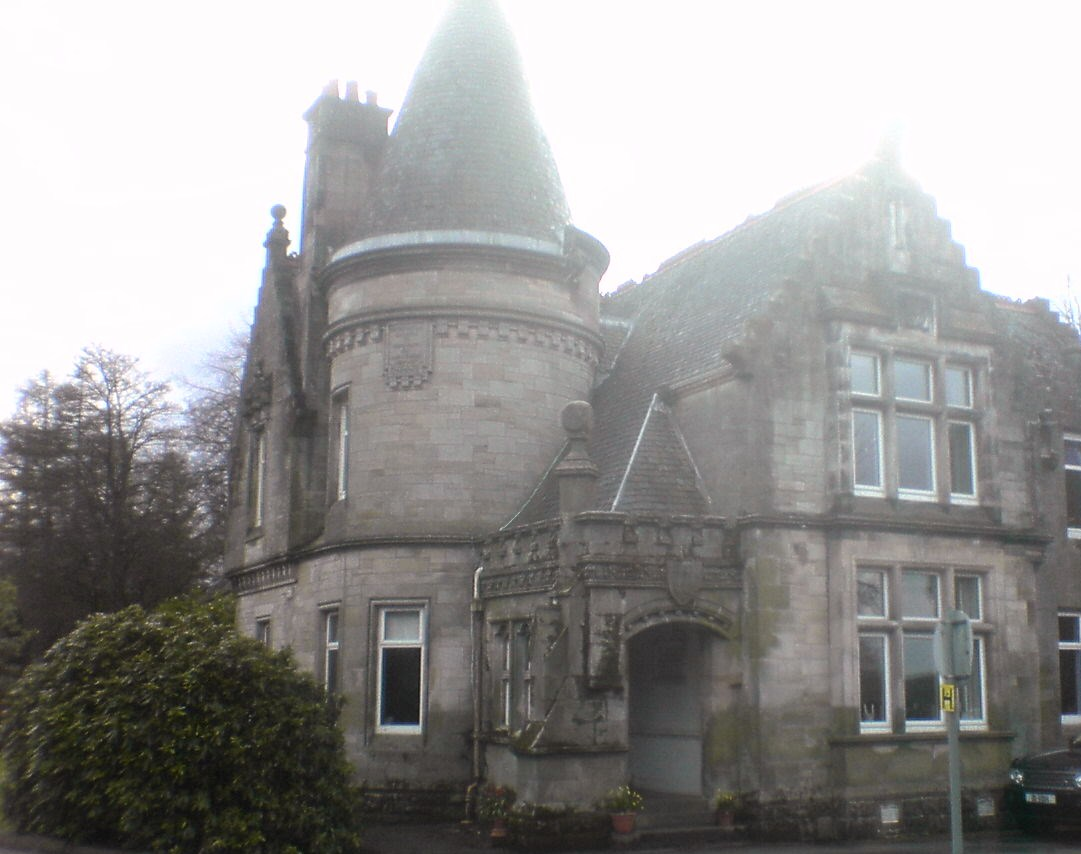
Sabbath School Home (1894), built from funds donated by Sunday School children across Scotland, later serving as a home for adults with epilepsy. One of the few examples of Scottish Baronial architecture in the village.

Each of the residential houses built in Quarrier's Village were to an individual design, with donors having a large influence in the style in which their cottages were cast, and also the buildings' names. As such, the village is an unusual mix of Gothic, French, Old English, Scottish baronial and Italian. The overall plan of the village is of a more English style than is typical in the area, with a parkland and village green-type layout. Only three houses in the village can be directly traced to traditional Scottish architecture.

Despite this mix of styles, one architect is responsible for virtually the entire old village: Robert Bryden of the Clarke and Bell firm in Glasgow. Bryden worked free of charge on Quarrier's projects over a course of some twenty-eight years.

== Local government ==
Quarrier's Village is part of the civil parish of Kilmacolm and continues to be associated with it for the purposes of local government. The Kilmacolm Community Council represents its interests to the local authority, Inverclyde Council. For local government electoral purposes, Kilmacolm and Quarrier's Village both form part of the Inverclyde East electoral ward.

There is also a residents' association for the village, the Quarrier's Village Council.

== See also ==
- List of listed buildings in Kilmacolm, Inverclyde

== Notes ==
=== References ===
- Overview of Quarrier's Village, Gazetteer for Scotland
