= Kilmacolm =

Village in Inverclyde, Scotland

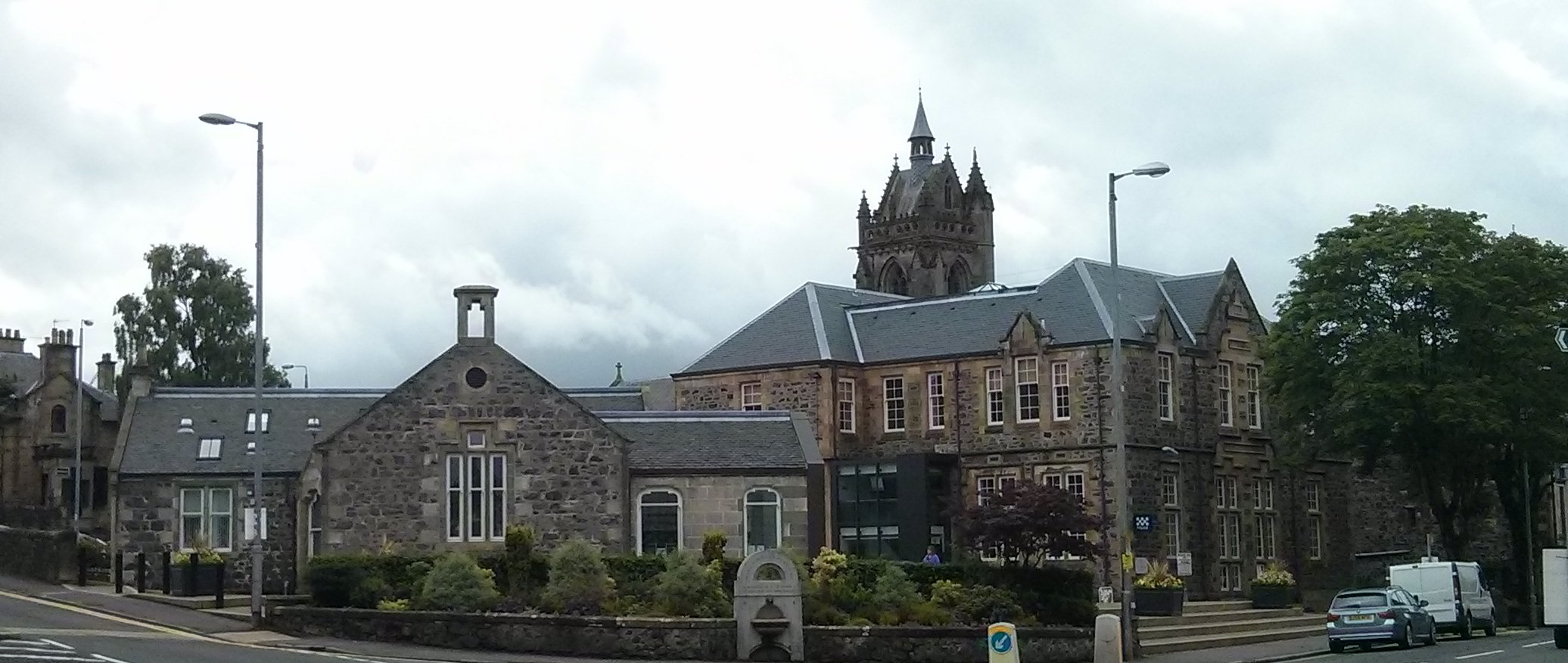
- Kilmacolm centre from the Cross

- Location within Inverclyde
- Population: 3,930 (2020)
- OS grid reference: NS365695
  - Edinburgh: 56 mi (90 km)
  - London: 355 mi (571 km)
- Community council: Kilmacolm
- Council area: Inverclyde
- Lieutenancy area: Renfrewshire
- Country: Scotland
- Sovereign state: United Kingdom
- Post town: KILMACOLM
- Postcode district: PA13
- Dialling code: 01505
- Police: Scotland
- Fire: Scottish
- Ambulance: Scottish
- UK Parliament: Inverclyde
- Scottish Parliament: Inverclyde

Kilmacolm (/ˌkɪlməˈkoʊlm/) is a village and civil parish in the Inverclyde council area, and the historic county of Renfrewshire in the west central Lowlands of Scotland. It lies on the northern slope of the Gryffe Valley, 7 1/2 miles (12 kilometres) southeast of Greenock and around 15 miles (24 km) west of the city of Glasgow. The village has a population of around 4,000 and is part of a wider civil parish which covers a large rural hinterland of 15,000 hectares (150 km^{2}; 58 sq mi) containing within it the smaller settlement of Quarrier's Village, originally established as a 19th-century residential orphans' home.

The area surrounding the village was settled in prehistoric times and emerged as part of a feudal society with the parish divided between separate estates for much of its history. The village itself remained small, providing services to nearby farm communities and acting as a religious hub for the parish. The name of the village derives from the Scottish Gaelic Cill MoCholuim, indicating the dedication of its church to St Columba. The parish church was mentioned in a papal bull of 1225 showing its appropriation to Paisley Abbey, and it sits on the site of an ancient religious community dating to the 5th or 6th centuries. Again in the 13th century, Duchal Castle was constructed in the parish and is notable for being besieged by King James IV of Scotland in 1489, following the resident Lyle family's support of an insurrection against him. Feuding between the noble families of Kilmacolm was commonplace in the Middle Ages, and in the 16th and 17th centuries, the parish again came to the attention of the Crown for providing support to outlawed religious Covenanters.

The character of the village changed significantly in the Victorian era, with the arrival of the railway in Kilmacolm in 1869. Many of Kilmacolm's modern buildings were constructed between this date and the outbreak of World War I. The emergence of such transport links enabled the village to expand as an affluent dormitory village serving the nearby urban centres of Glasgow, Paisley and Greenock. The economy of the village reflected this population change, moving away from its traditional reliance on agriculture to providing tertiary sector services to residents and visitors.

== History ==
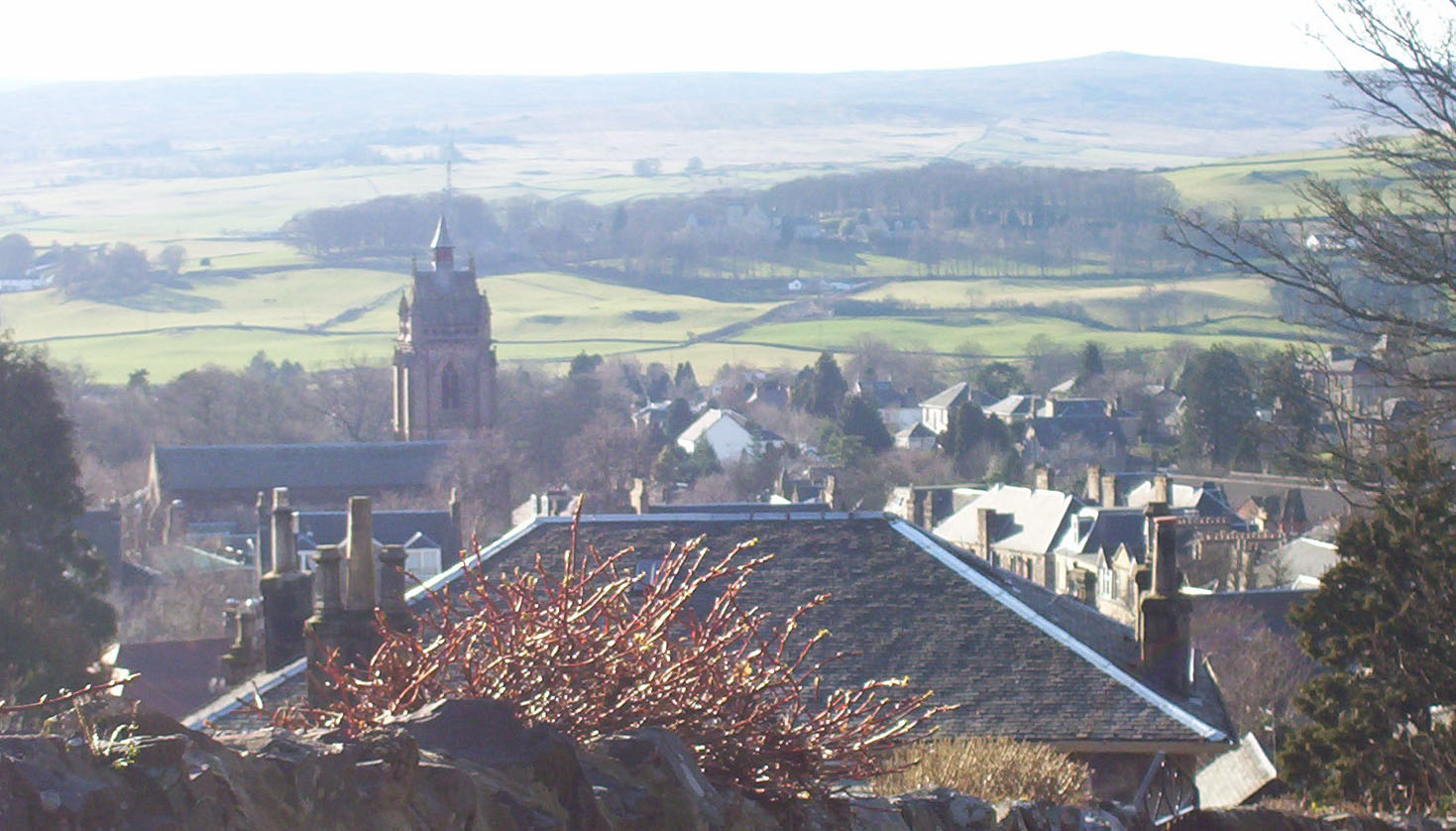
Kilmacolm village viewed from Rowantreehill.

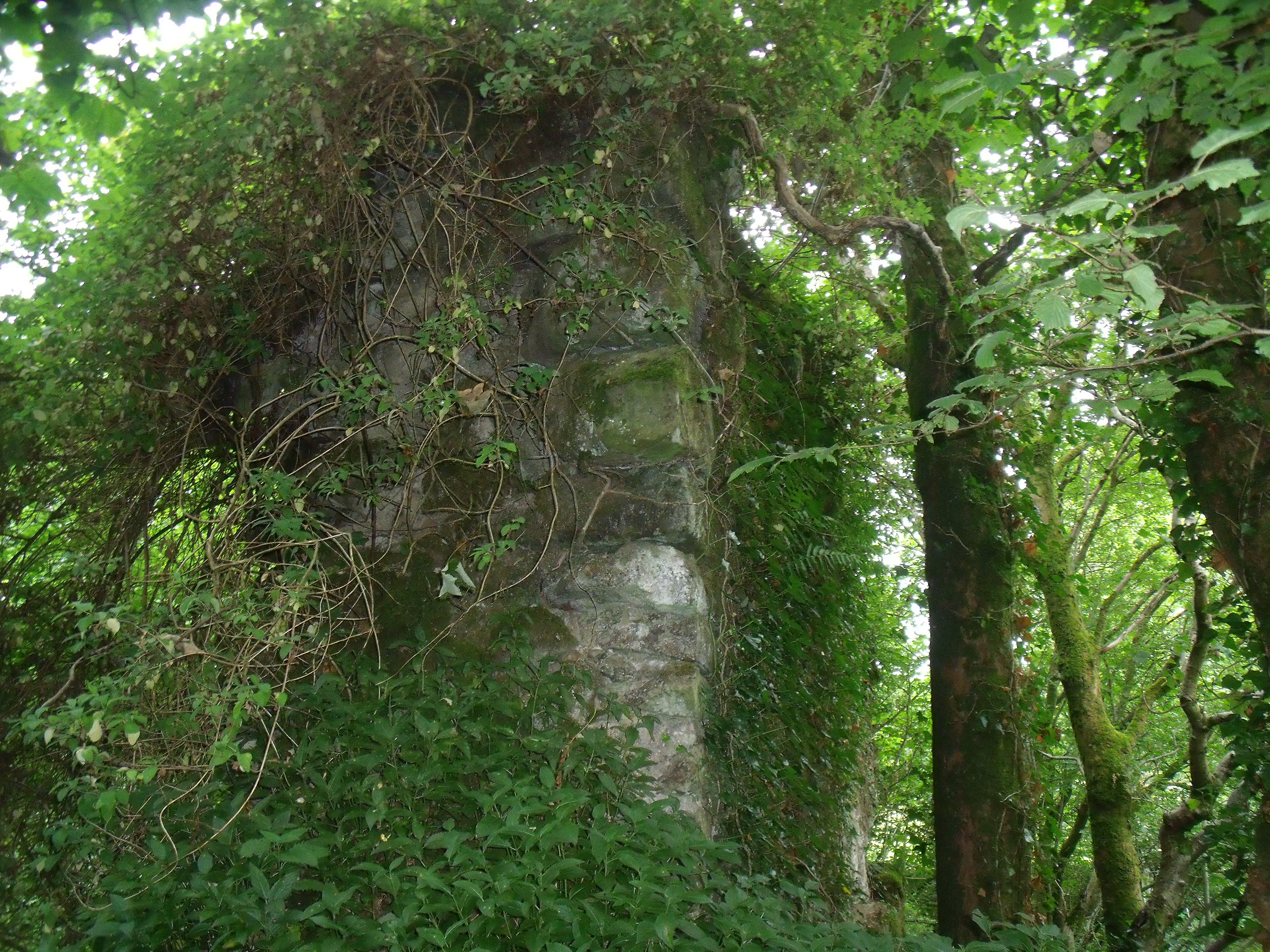
Remains of the 13th century Duchal Castle.

=== Toponymy ===
Kilmacolm is generally believed to take its name from the Scots Gaelic language, meaning "cell or church of Columba" as derived from the dedication of an ancient church to St. Columba of Iona. This is generally associated with the religious cell which was established in the sixth or seventh century on the site of the current parish church. The current parish church, known as the Old Kirk, was largely constructed in the 19th century and incorporates parts of an older, 13th-century Norman church, which has become the Murray Chapel.

Traditionally it is believed that the village was the location of a cordial meeting in the latter half of the sixth century between Columba and St Kentigern, known locally as St Mungo, the patron saint of Glasgow. In his book Kilmacolm: A Parish History, 1100–1898, the then Minister of the Parish, James Murray, claims history would suggest the meeting took place at Glasgow, noting only that "as, on that occasion, [Columba] passed up the southern bank of the Clyde, he necessarily traversed a portion of Kilmacolm Parish."

For a period in the 18th century, Kilmacolm was generally spelled 'Kilmalcolm', based on a presumption that the settlement's name originated with one of the kings of Scotland named Malcolm. A vote of the parochial board in 1905 altered the accepted spelling to 'Kilmacolm', based largely on a case made by the previously mentioned Rev. James Murray that this association was mistaken.

=== Early settlement ===
The early human settlement of Kilmacolm can be traced as far back as the Stone Age, with a number of archaeological discoveries made within the village dating from that period. The most significant of these findings is the agricultural homestead located near to the Knapps Loch, which was excavated in the early 1960s. Later examples of human habitation in the parish are numerous.

A number of early settlements around the village are listed as ancient monuments by the government agency Historic Environment Scotland. These include a number of Bronze or Iron Age hut circles and roundhouses that are believed to have formed lightly defended homesteads. While not listed, the homestead at Knapps is also mentioned by the agency as being believed to have a similar age.

As the Romans advanced north through Ancient Britain, they entered Kilmacolm – near to the Antonine Wall and contributing to the defence of the Empire's northern frontier. A Roman road leading to a fort at Old Kilpatrick was constructed through the north of the parish. Other forts were built at nearby Whitemoss, with a more significant one on Barochan Hill outside of neighbouring Houston, Renfrewshire. The Romans' continued presence as far north as Kilmacolm was, however, short lived.

A motte also exists beside the Gryffe Water within the Duchal Estate, sometimes known as Denniston Motte. It is believed to have been part of an Anglo-Norman timber castle dating from the 12th or 13th century. The former building on the site is stated by Historic Environment Scotland to have "almost certainly acted as a manorial estate centre". There are potential associations with two local landowners: the Lyle family that later held Duchal Castle or the Dennistoun family who later occupied Finlaystone House. Its site listing also notes that "local tradition holds it to be the site of a Roman watertower".

=== Mediaeval and early modern Kilmacolm ===
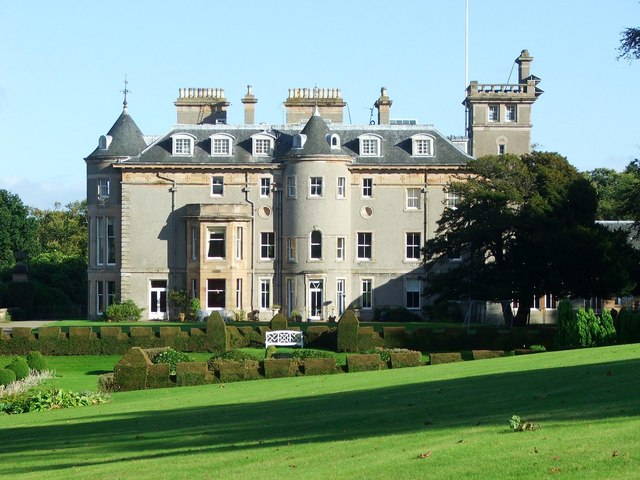
Finlaystone House, seat of the Earls of Glencairn

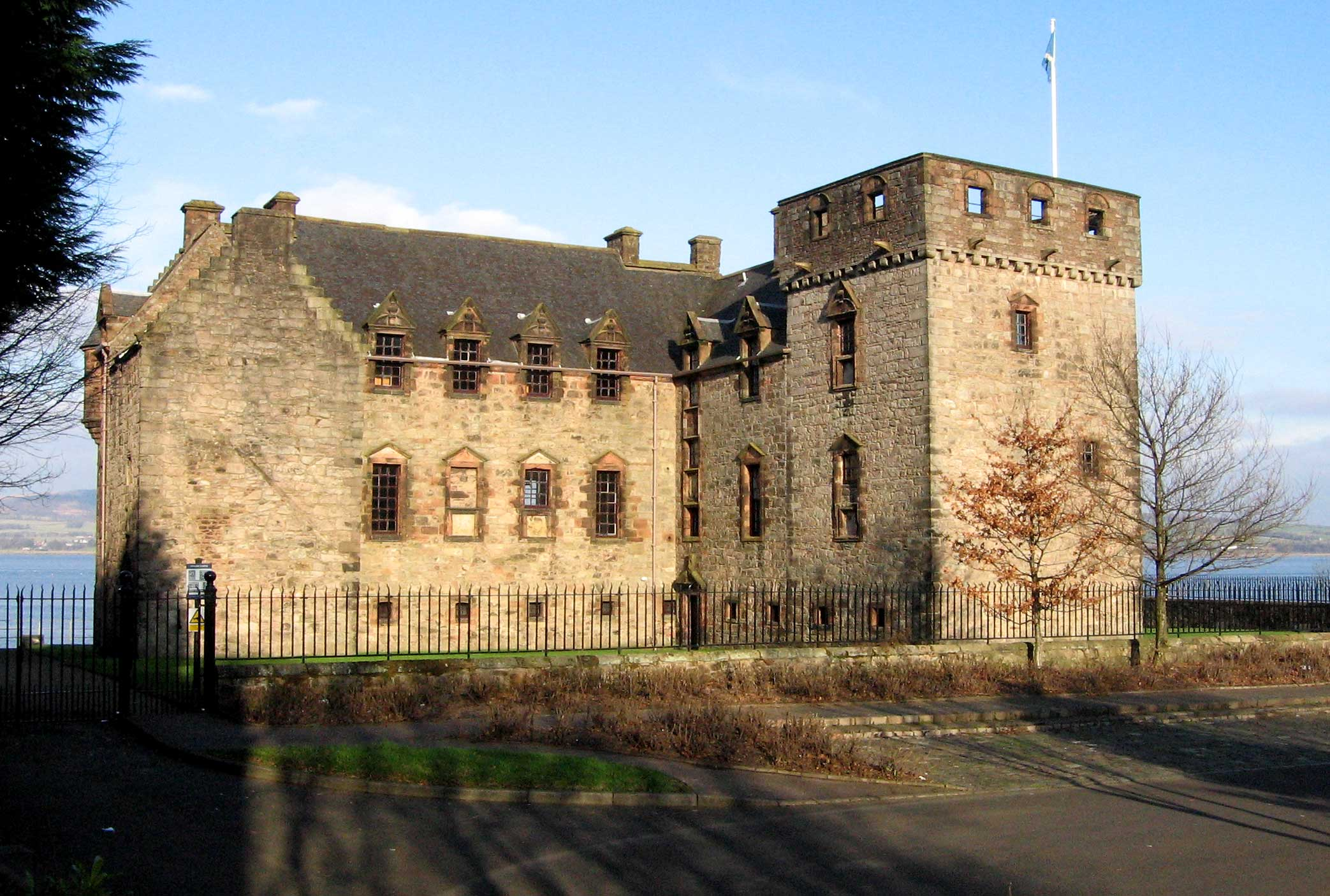
Newark Castle, formerly in the parish and seat of the Maxwells.

In the Middle Ages and Early Modern period, Kilmacolm was part of a largely feudal society within the Kingdom of Scotland and later in the Kingdom of Great Britain. The parish was largely divided between two estates, which throughout most of the period were based at Duchal Castle and Finlaystone House and began with its division between two families: the Dennistouns and the Lyles, who were later replaced by other families through sale or marriage. Many of the external problems of the two families related to religious disputes, the favour of the Crown and feuds with other families. From the early 13th century, Kilmacolm is mentioned in records of the church which seems to have been dedicated either to Malcolm III or, more likely, Saint Columba. These records include an early papal bull of Pope Honorius III in 1225 and generally demonstrate the subservience of the church at Kilmacolm and the surrounding villages of Strathgryfe to Paisley Abbey.

Duchal Castle, on the outskirts of Kilmacolm was constructed by Ralph de l'Isle (also referred to as Radulphus de Insula), whose surname was later Anglicised to Lyle, in the 13th century and remained in the family until purchased by the Porterfields in 1544. The Porterfields occupied the castle until 1710, when much of it was deconstructed and the stone used to build a new home further down the River Gryffe, which exists to this day as Duchal House. The ruins of the castle are still located in the parish. The name 'duchal' means 'between two rivers', and this indeed is reflected in the Castle's position, set between Green Water and its tributary, the Blacketty Water. Most significant in the Castle's history was its siege by King James IV of Scotland in July 1489, following the Lyle's support of an insurrection against him. The King attended personally and, according to accounts, the inhabitants of the Castle surrendered immediately on the sight of the famous Mons Meg cannon being rolled into position against them. The castle, however, was fired upon, and one of the Royal cannon gained the name "Duchal".

The Dennistoun family originated in the parish in the mid-12th century and ended with Sir Robert Dennistoun, who died in 1399 with no male heirs. His two daughters inherited his parts of his estate and married into two new noble families, thus creating three main estates in Kilmacolm rather than two. The Cunninghams, later to become the Earls of Glencairn, had their seat at Finlaystone House, and the Maxwells later constructed a seat at Newark Castle in an area once known as Nether Finlaystone. With the death of John Cunningham, 15th Earl of Glencairn in 1796, his title became extinct. Finlaystone House was passed to multiple owners, and is now the seat of the chief of the Clan MacMillan. In 1668, Sir George Maxwell sold much of his lands at Newark to the city of Glasgow, for the development of Port Glasgow. A later Sir George Maxwell disposed of his estate in the early 18th century. Newark Castle is now owned and operated by Historic Scotland.

The Duchal estates were acquired from the Lyles by John Porterfield in 1544. The Porterfields were staunch Covenanters, and Duchal was widely seen as a refuge when the profession of such sympathies was criminalised in the 17th century. Illegal Conventicles were held in the estate, particularly on the natural amphitheatre which is positioned within the present-day 14th hole of the Kilmacolm Golf Club. As a result of these religious sympathies, the estate was sequestered by the Crown in 1684, and the men of the Porterfield family were arrested; it was however returned following the Glorious Revolution.

The last of the Duchal-based Porterfield family was James Corbett Porterfield, who died without an heir in 1855. His estate then passed to Sir Hugh Shaw-Stewart, 8th Baronet, who served as a Unionist politician and Lord Lieutenant of Renfrewshire. Duchal House was subsequently purchased by the first Lord Maclay, and remains in the family to this day.

=== Modern Kilmacolm ===
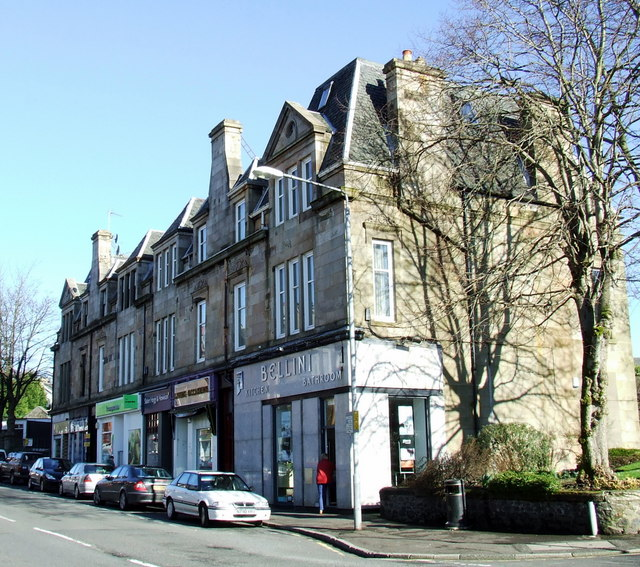
The Lyle Buildings, Lochwinnoch Road – a row of small shops in the Victorian village centre.

The arrival of the railway in Kilmacolm in 1869 marked a significant turning point in the village's history and lead to Victorian era expansion on a grand scale. Prior to this development, the village had changed little in the preceding centuries, falling behind the development of other parts of the county. Kilmacolm's rail connection came about as a result of railway companies entering into the shipping trade and the perceived need to link Glasgow directly to Greenock's waterfront. Links to the wider world, and particularly Glasgow, made the village an attractive dormitory settlement.

Kilmacolm expanded at an unprecedented speed and many of the large Victorian and Edwardian villas which characterise the village today were constructed, as well as such attractions as the Hydropathic Hotel and facilities such as banks and plumbed water. Combined with the dramatic expansion of the village and gentrification of the area, the traditional importance of agriculture to the parish economy declined significantly. Slightly further east on the railway line, William Quarrier's Orphans' Homes were opened in the 1870s and remained as a residential children's community until the late 1970s. Since then, what has become known as Quarrier's Village has become largely residential.

Kilmacolm gradually became a place with numerous amenities, with the construction of the Victorian schoolhouses of the village, the opening of a Royal Bank of Scotland branch in 1872 and piped clean water in 1878. Indicative of the changes which the gentrification of the village brought, in the 1920s a local referendum was held in the village under the Temperance (Scotland) Act 1913, resulting in it becoming a dry parish where the sale of alcohol was illegal. The numerous public houses which had existed in the Kilmacolm declined, and it was to have no such establishment from this time until the 1990s. In 1921, the parish council purchased the former Buchanan Arms building at the cross, turning it into a Village Institute or community centre, which it has continued to be until the renovation of the Cargill Centre in 2009–10. In the religious sphere, the establishment of many of Kilmacolm's churches can be credited to religious disagreements, particularly the practice of patronage within the Church of Scotland – which allowed local landowners to choose a parish minister. This practice ended in 1874.

World War I paused local development somewhat, and 300 men (66 of whom were officers) in the parish enlisted in the British Armed Forces. The village came to accommodate a number of Belgian refugees. In the Second World War, Kilmacolm was used to house evacuees from Glasgow and public buildings were used to house those made homeless by the Greenock Blitz in 1941. One bomb fell in Kilmacolm, causing minor damage and, following the war, the hydropathic hotel was used as a naval hospital until being returned to private ownership with its purchase by Stakis Hotels.

The modern village retains the character of its Victorian and Edwardian boom. Kilmacolm railway station was closed in 1983, and the track converted into a recreational cycle path. Despite an increase in new housing in the village during the latter half of the 20th century and a corresponding increase in population, particularly in the 1960s and 70s, Kilmacolm has remained reasonably static in size over the past decade. Expansion into green belt land is now discouraged and, combined with a high demand for housing, this has led to an identified shortage of affordable housing in the village.

The Olympic Flame was carried through the village on 8 June 2012, as part of the British Isles torch relay in celebration of the London 2012 Olympic Games.

== Governance ==
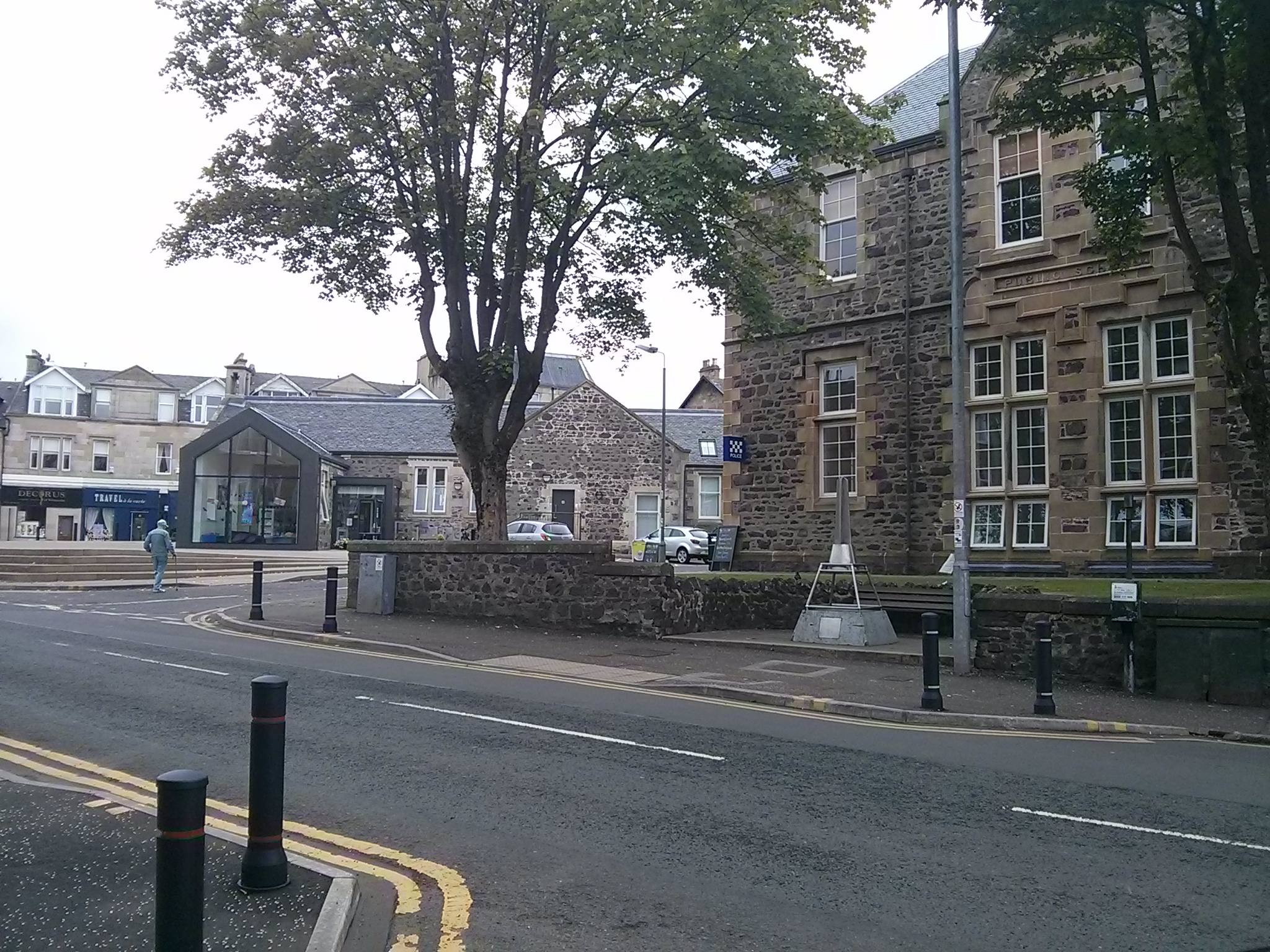
The Cargill Centre and library, showing time capsule in the foreground.

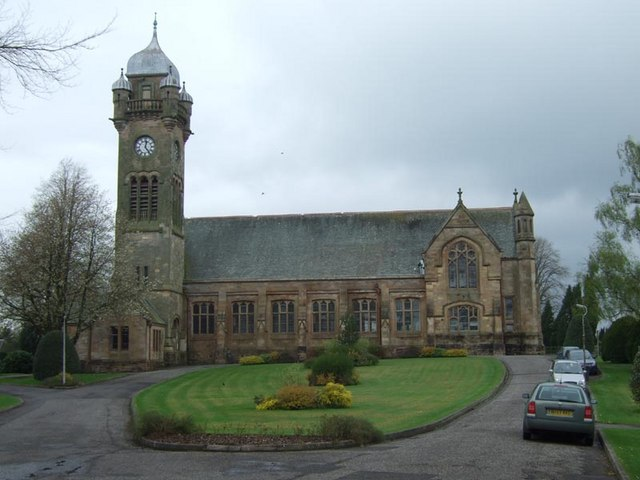
Mount Zion Church ('the Children's Cathedral') in Quarrier's Village, the other significant settlement in the civil parish of Kilmacolm.

Kilmacolm is the name of a wider civil parish, including the village of Kilmacolm, Quarrier's Village and a large rural hinterland. Civil parishes have been superseded in local government by modern community council areas, with Kilmacolm, Quarrier's Village and the surrounding area falling within the Kilmacolm community council area.

At a higher level, Kilmacolm elects members to the local authority – Inverclyde Council – as well as to the Scottish Parliament and the Parliament of the United Kingdom.

=== Local government ===
The parish is represented by Kilmacolm community council, a statutory body consulted in relation to local government matters.

In common with other such bodies, Kilmacolm Community Council is not party political. It meets monthly in the Cargill Centre, except in July and December, with an annual general meeting held in May.It meets weekly in the village hall on Wednesday nights.The most recent contested election to the community council were held in October 2015; the most recent election in September 2019 had a number of nominees fewer than the number of positions available, so was uncontested.

The local authority for Kilmacolm and Quarrier's Village is Inverclyde Council, one of the three local council areas in Renfrewshire and one of thirty-two across Scotland. Since 1999, the administration of local government in Scotland has been a devolved matter within the competence of the Scottish Parliament.

Inverclyde West Ward (2022 Inverclyde Council election)
| Party | Candidate | FPv% | Count |
| Party | Candidate | FPv% | 1 |
|---|---|---|---|
| Independent | Lynne Quinn (incumbent) | | 1,440 |
| SNP | Sandra Reynolds | | 1,271 |
| Labour | Martin McCluskey | | 1,247 |
| Conservative | Ted Runciman | | 453 |
| Alba | Christopher McEleny (incumbent) | | 126 |
| Liberal Democrats | John Burleigh | | 171 |
| Independent | William Wilson | | 66 |
Electorate: TBC Valid: 4,774 Quota: 1,194 Turnout: 4,804

From the introduction of proportional representation in local council elections in Scotland in 2007 until 2017, Kilmacolm was joined with Port Glasgow to create a four-member ward known as Inverclyde East. Following a review of local government boundaries, the boundaries of Inverclyde East were reduced to include Kilmacolm, Quarrier's Village and only a portion of the east of Port Glasgow. It is now a three-member ward represented by Deputy Provost David Wilson (Conservative), Councillor Christopher Curley (SNP) and Leader of the Council Councillor Stephen McCabe (Labour).

=== Central government ===
Kilmacolm is part of the Inverclyde and Renfrewshire West constituency for elections to House of Commons in the Parliament of the United Kingdom. This constituency was created for the 2024 UK general election by combining the old Inverclyde constituency with western parts of Renfrewshire including Bridge of Weir, Houston, and Crosslee. Following the 2024 UK general election the current member of Parliament for the area is Martin McCluskey MP.

For elections to the Scottish Parliament, Kilmacolm is currently part of the Inverclyde constituency. It was previously part of the Renfrewshire North and West constituency (2011–2026) and Renfrewshire West (1999–2011) constituencies. It is also part of the West Scotland Scottish Parliament electoral region. The incumbent constituency Member of the Scottish Parliament is Stuart McMillan MSP.

=== Politics ===
By the early 2000s, before the introduction of proportional representation for local council elections in Scotland in 2007, Kilmacolm was considered a safe Conservative ward and typically elected the only Conservative member to Inverclyde Council.

Following the death of Councillor Alex Calvert, a by-election was held in the Kilmacolm ward on 8 February 2001. Turnout fell to 43.9%, down from 65.3% in the 1999 election, and turned Kilmacolm into a Conservative-Liberal Democrat marginal area, with the Conservatives' (represented by the former councillor's wife, Helen Calvert) lead being slashed 29% to 6% over the Lib Dems who rose from fourth to second place in the poll. In 2003, Liberal Democrat Tom Fyfe was elected by a narrow margin in Kilmacolm, also marking the return of control of Inverclyde Council from Labour to the Lib Dems. Since the 2007 local government elections, Kilmacolm has formed part of a larger multi-member ward named Inverclyde East.

== Geography ==
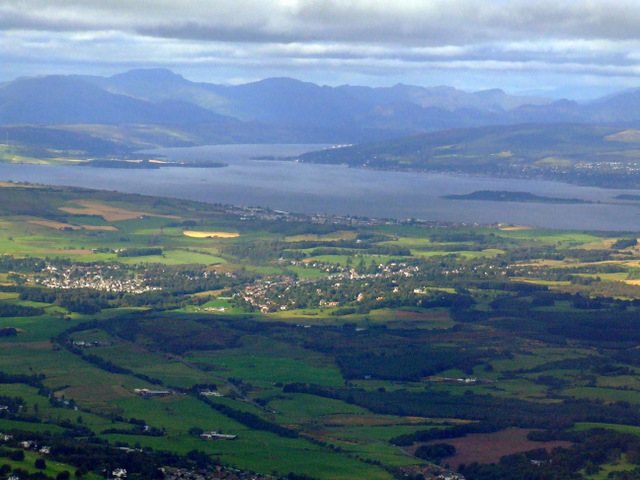
Kilmacolm and the Firth of Clyde from the air

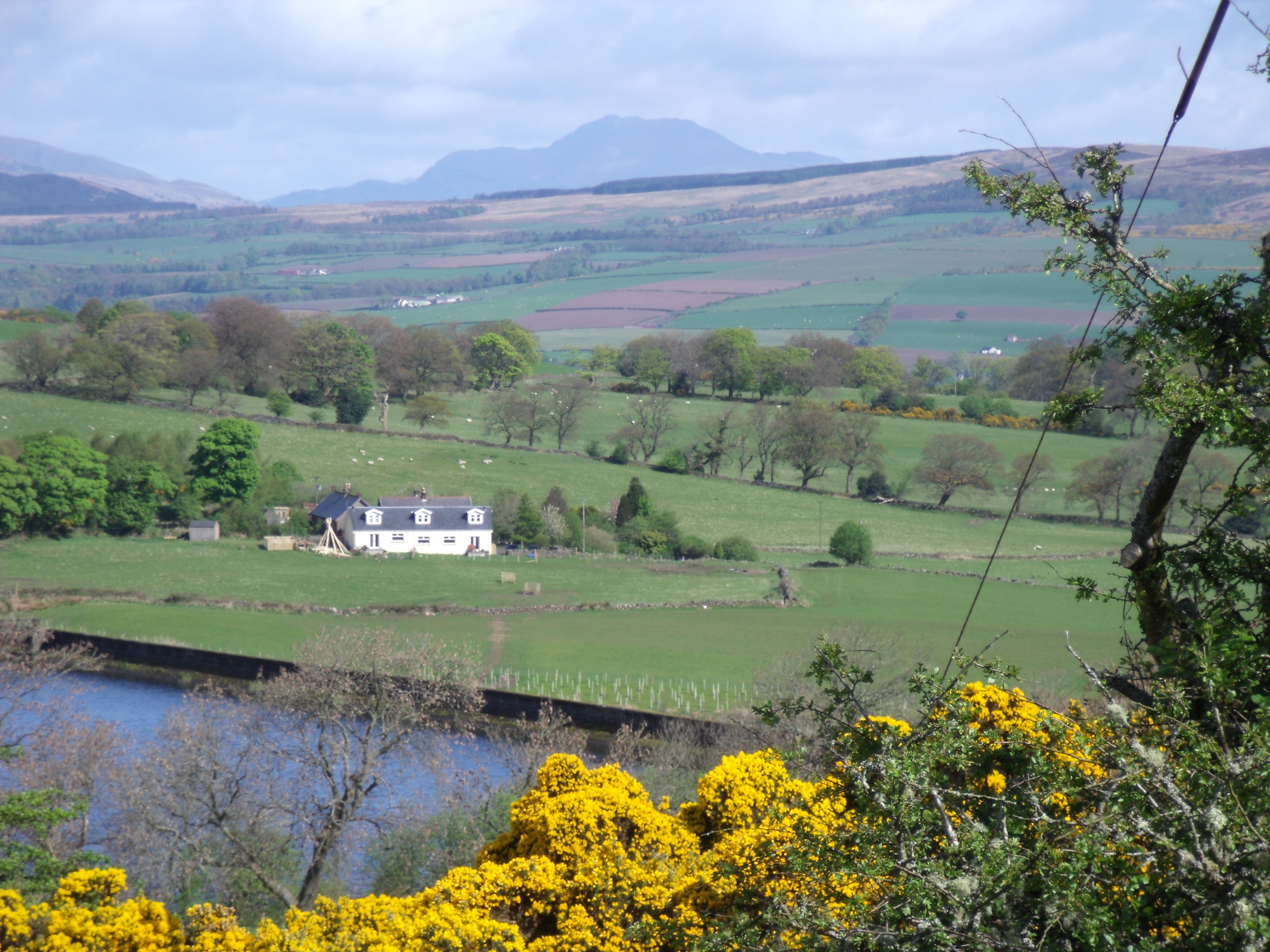
View to the north of the parish and the River Clyde with Auchendores reservoir and Ben Lomond visible.

At 55.89079°N 4.61601°W Kilmacolm is situated in the Gryffe Valley in Scotland's western Central Lowlands. The village lies 350 feet (110 m) above sea level, 4 miles (6 km) south-east of Port Glasgow, 7 1/2 miles (12 km) east-south-east of Greenock, the administrative centre of Inverclyde; and 15 miles (24 km) west-north-west of Glasgow, the nearest city.

Kilmacolm lies within a civil parish of the same name of 29.6 square miles (77 km^{2}) of largely rural land. The parish stretches to the Firth of Clyde, some 4 miles (6 km) north of the village, and west into the Clyde Muirshiel Regional Park. The parish borders the parishes of Erskine, Greenock, Houston and Killellan, Inverkip, Kilbarchan, Largs, Lochwinnoch and Port Glasgow.

The area generally consists of lightly sloping and occasionally rocky (mostly granite) moorland.River Gryffe, a tributary of the Black Cart Water, begins its flow in the village, running through Quarrier's Village and then on to Bridge of Weir and other villages in the Gryffe Valley.

A number of significant bodies of water exist close to the village, including the Auchendores reservoir at Cloak (to the north of the village) and the Knapps Loch, part of the Duchal estate. The Knapps Loch and the area around it is used for recreational activities and events in the village. The Loch is itself artificial, having been created by a local angling club in the early 20th century. It is shallow, with a number of islands, and has a small boathouse and landing stage at the shore.

== Demography ==
Kilmacolm had a population of 126 in the year 1791. This had risen to 291 in 1811.

Kilmacolm in the UK Census 2001
| | Kilmacolm | Inverclyde | Scotland |
|---|---|---|---|
| Total population | 4,000 | 84,203 | 5,062,011 |
| Foreign born | 3.8% | 2.1% | 3.8% |
| Over 75 years old | 8.7% | 7.3% | 7.1% |
| Unemployed | 2.4% | 4.6% | 3.9% |

In the 2001 United Kingdom Census, Kilmacolm is listed as a locality area consisting of the main village settlement.

The total population of the village and census area was 4,000. 95.9% of this population were born in the United Kingdom, with 81.0% born in Scotland or a part of the UK not specified. 0.4% were born in the Republic of Ireland, with 1.1% born in the rest of Europe and 2.4% born elsewhere.

The median age of males and females living in Kilmacolm was 43 and 46 years respectively, compared to 37 and 39 years for those in the whole of Scotland. Kilmacolm has a higher than average level of older people, with categories of people under the age of 45 being below the Scottish average, and categories above that age being higher; 23% of people in Kilmacolm are of pensionable age and over contrasting with 19% in Scotland as a whole.

== Economy ==
Prior to the Victorian era gentrification of the village, Kilmacolm had an almost entirely agricultural economy. Its income was boosted in the late 18th century by being a site of fairs, markets and religious events. In the 18th and 19th centuries, weaving took place in the village producing cotton and linen. This production initially existed as a cottage industry and later a small factory was opened in the 1870s. The 19th century saw a downturn in the village, which was slow to adopt modern farming practices and overtaken in importance by other nearby settlements.

The village's Victorian and Edwardian expansion was largely a response to the greater commuting opportunities available following the arrival of the railway in the village in 1869. The laying of a railway line through Kilmacolm occurred in order to provide a direct boat train link between Glasgow's St Enoch station and the harbour at Princes Pier in Greenock. The clean air of the parish was hailed as having great health benefits, attracting both visitors and new residents who constructed significant residential properties in the village.

Since this time, the village has been primarily a residential dormitory settlement, with the economy accordingly altering its focus to the provision of services to residents and visitors. Kilmacolm developed as a holiday resort in the late 19th and early 20th centuries, mainly surrounding the hydropathic hotel opened in 1880.

== Culture and community ==
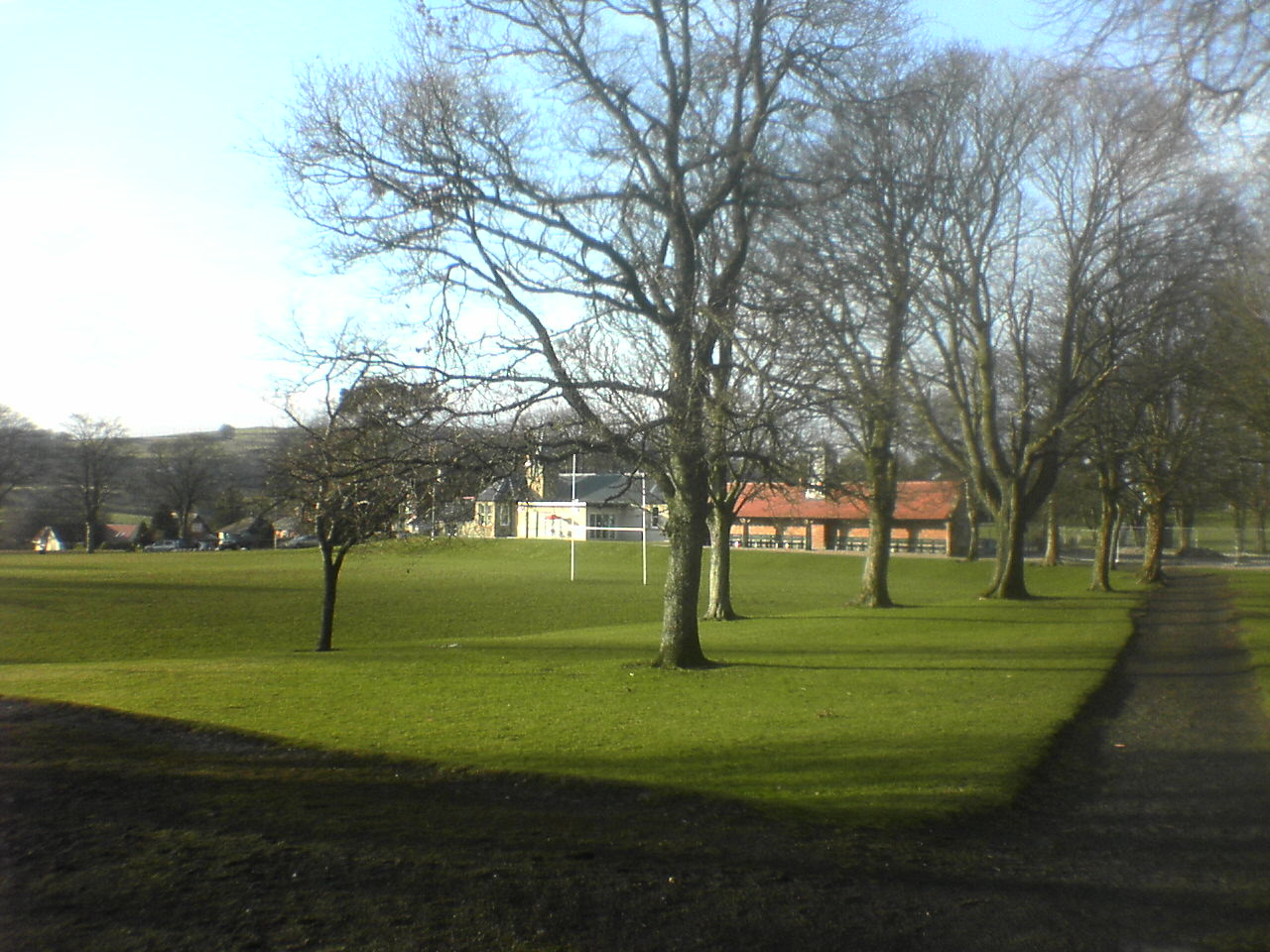
Birkmyre Park, with pavilion visible

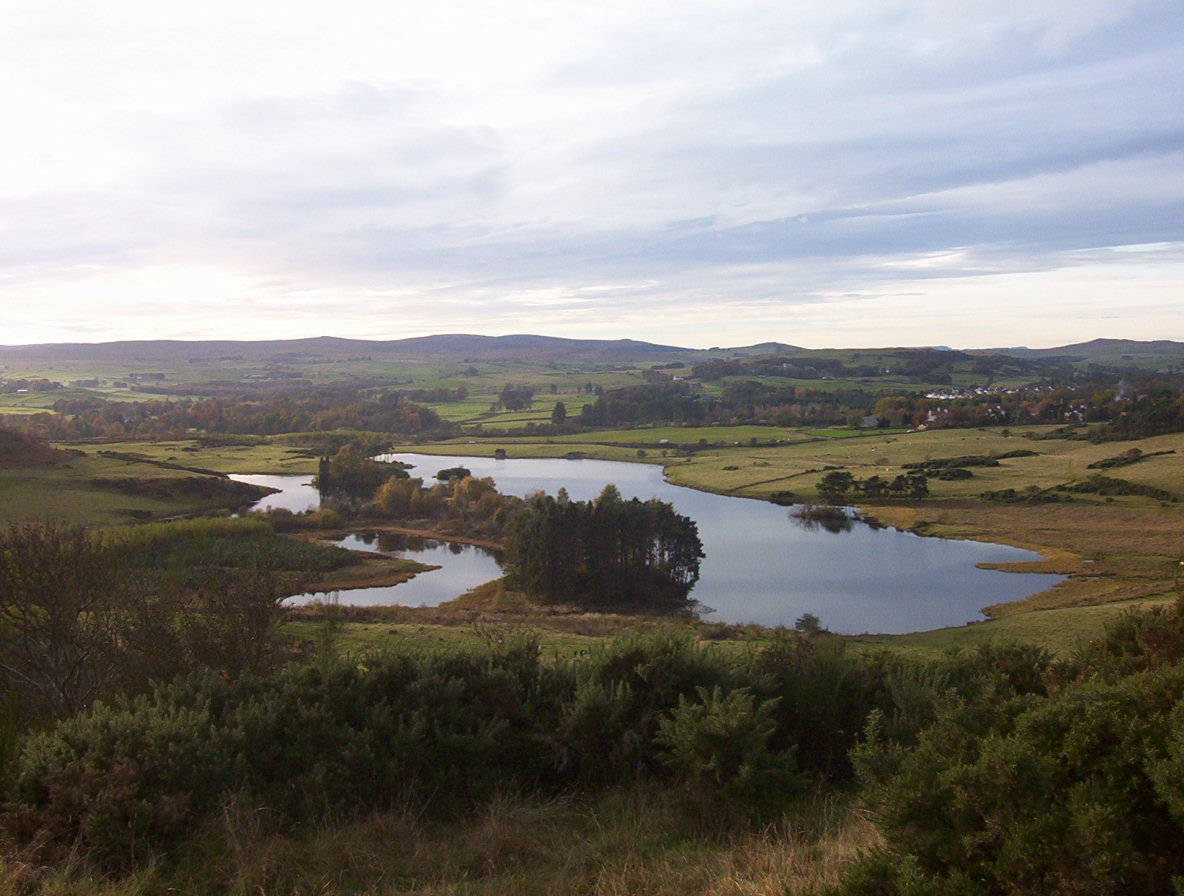
The Knapps Loch, Kilmacolm.The village is shown in the top right. Most of the surrounding countryside is moorland.

=== Parks and recreation ===
There are number of community and recreational facilities in Kilmacolm. Set largely in open countryside, a number of outdoor pursuits such as angling and golf are available in the local area. Clyde Muirshiel Regional Park extends into the parish, which also contains Glen Moss Wildlife Reserve, a Site of Special Scientific Interest operated by the Scottish Wildlife Trust.

A public park, Birkmyre Park, was donated by local merchant Adam Birkmyre for the benefit of the parish in 1897. The park is held and managed by the Birkmyre Trust. Recent redevelopment has modified the park's pavilion to contain a fitness gymnasium, a café and changing facilities as well as including a new children's playpark. Birkmyre Park also hosts association football, rugby and cricket within its grounds. In 2009, the Trust proposed reopening the former tennis courts and putting green in Birkmyre Park following public consultation, as well as creating a court for basketball and netball. Two smaller public parks exist within the Kilmacolm area: the smaller West Glen Park and a playpark in Quarrier's Village.

=== Sport ===
Local sports teams generally meet at the village's Birkmyre Park. These include the Birkmyre Rugby Club, who compete in the Scottish Rugby Union's West regional league and Kilmacolm Cricket Club, an amateur team with a long history. The park is also used by sports teams for the village's schools.

There is also a Kilmacolm Golf Club, Kilmacolm Tennis Club, Kilmacolm Bowling Club and Kilmacolm Squash Club, all of which have their own private facilities.

=== Events ===
There was formerly a funfair held annually in Birkmyre Park. Due to park refurbishment, it has not continued in recent years although alternative sites are under review. A circus visited the park in 2010.

The field beside the Knapps Loch is used for community events such as the Kilmacolm and Port Glasgow Agricultural Society's annual show and the Bonfire Night celebrations.

=== Cultural references ===
Kilmacolm is depicted as 'Kilellan' in R.J. Price's Renfrewshire short stories A Boy in Summer (2002) and features briefly in Raymond Friel's poetry collection Stations of the Heart (2009). The Scottish sketch comedy Chewin' the Fat also featured a character, a man who breaks cultural taboos or does something very anti-social. When challenged or criticized, he then explains away his actions by saying that he's "from Kilmacolm", which would immediately win understanding of his superiority from everyone around him.

=== Notable people ===
People with links to Kilmacolm are known as Kilmacolmics or Kilmacomics.

The village has a long political tradition. The first Lord Maclay was a shipbuilder and later served as a minister from 1916 to 1922 in the coalition government. His son, the second Lord Maclay served as a Liberal Member of Parliament (MP) for Paisley. John Maclay, 1st Viscount Muirshiel, the younger brother of the second Lord Maclay, was a National Liberal and Conservative MP, who served as Secretary of State for Scotland from 1957 to 1962. Annabel Goldie, The Baroness Goldie, former leader of the Scottish Conservatives (2005–11) and member of the House of Lords was brought up in Kilmacolm. Eleanor Laing, the former Conservative Member of Parliament for Epping Forest and Deputy Speaker of the House of Commons, was raised and educated in the village.

In entertainment and the arts, musicians Jim Kerr of Simple Minds and Chrissie Hynde of The Pretenders were residents of Kilmacolm, as was Gerry Rafferty in the 1970s. Hedrick Smith, a broadcaster in the United States, and television presenter Dallas Campbell also originate here. In business and industry Sir Eric Yarrow, Bart., notable for his connection with Yarrow Shipbuilders, lived in the village from 1982 until his death in 2018 and served as a deputy lieutenant of Renfrewshire. Ronald Campbell OBE – an engineer and pioneer of nuclear power in the UK – was also brought up in the area. The late Wing Commander Hector McLean of the Royal Air Force was a lifelong resident of the village.

In sports, Rachael Ferrier, who competed in the 2014 Winter Paralympics at Sochi as a sighted guide for visually impaired athlete Millie Knight also resides in Kilmacolm.

Prof William Arthur Harland FRSE, Professor of Forensic Medicine at Glasgow University lived in Kilmacolm.

Patrick Thoms (1873–1946) architect specialising in hotels and clubhouses.

=== Twinning ===
- Mérignies, Nord, France

In May 2014, Kilmacolm signed a twinning agreement with the village of Mérignies in north-eastern France. The twinning agreement with formalised with delegations from both villages first at Kilmacolm's annual show and again in Mérignies during the latter's Bastille Day celebration. A Kilmacolm-Mérignies Twinning Society co-ordinates activity around the twinning relationship, with support from the community council.

== Landmarks ==
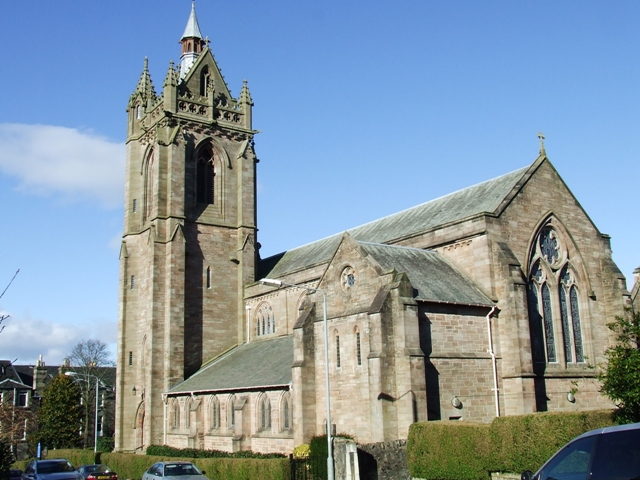
St Columba's Church, the steeple of which dominates the skyline of the village centre.

Whilst the village has a long history, the majority of its significant architecture is Victorian and Edwardian in origin, beginning with the arrival of the railway in the village, its gentrification and the subsequent boom in population. Using a wide variation of styles, the parish contains a considerable number of listed and notable buildings.

William Leiper's flamboyant Gothic Revival St Columba's Church is the most apparent Category A listed building in the village, with its tall saddleback tower modelled on the Church of St Nicholas in Caen, Normandy. Constructed between 1902 and 1905, it was the final church building of Leiper's career.

The parish church (Old Kirk), mainly constructed in 1831 incorporating a 13th-century chancel, is B-listed and another example of the Gothic Revival style. The third listed church in the parish, Mount Zion Church (Quarrier's Village; 1888; Robert A Bryden) is also Category B listed and in the Scots Baronial style.

The Cargill Centre, which since 2011 has served as the village's community centre, contains two Victorian former schoolhouses in the centre of the village. It contains a village hall, café and the Kilmacolm Library. Other notable non-residential listed buildings in the parish include Bridge of Weir Hospital built by William Quarrier, as a sanatorium for tuberculosis sufferers at the turn of the 20th century, in the free revivalist style and incorporating ecclesiastical references. The Hospital buildings are Category B listed, and have been converted into private flats. Shallot, the former mansionhouse of Adam Birkmyre which now accommodates the St Columba's Junior School, constructed in 1884, is also B-listed.

In the countryside outside the village are the ruins of Duchal Castle, dating back to the 13th century and lending its name to the modern Duchal House and estate in the village. On a hill above the village lies the derelict remains of Balrossie School, formerly the Sailors' Orphans' Home. Of historical interest are preserved examples of significant anti-aircraft batteries dating back to the Second World War contained within the parish, and a Decontamination Centre built in case of gas attacks on the United Kingdom. There is also a narrow-gauge railway line formerly used for grouse-shooting in Kilmacolm. Known as the Duchal Moor Railway, it lies within the Clyde Muirshiel Park; it was used by, amongst others, King Edward VIII and finally closed in the 1970s.

=== Residential buildings ===
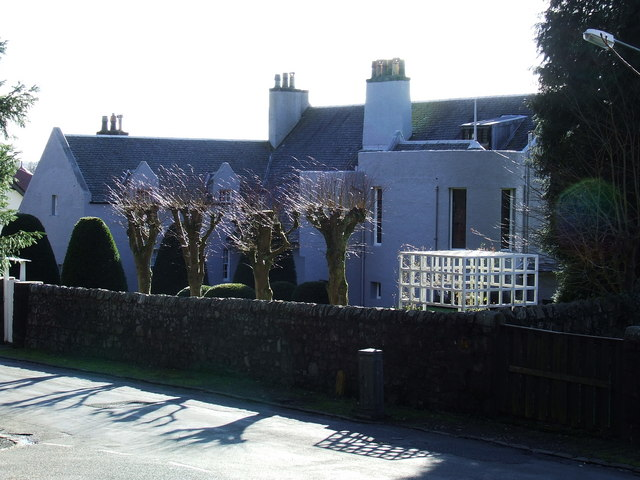
'Windy Hill', Charles Rennie Mackintosh's largest work in the village.

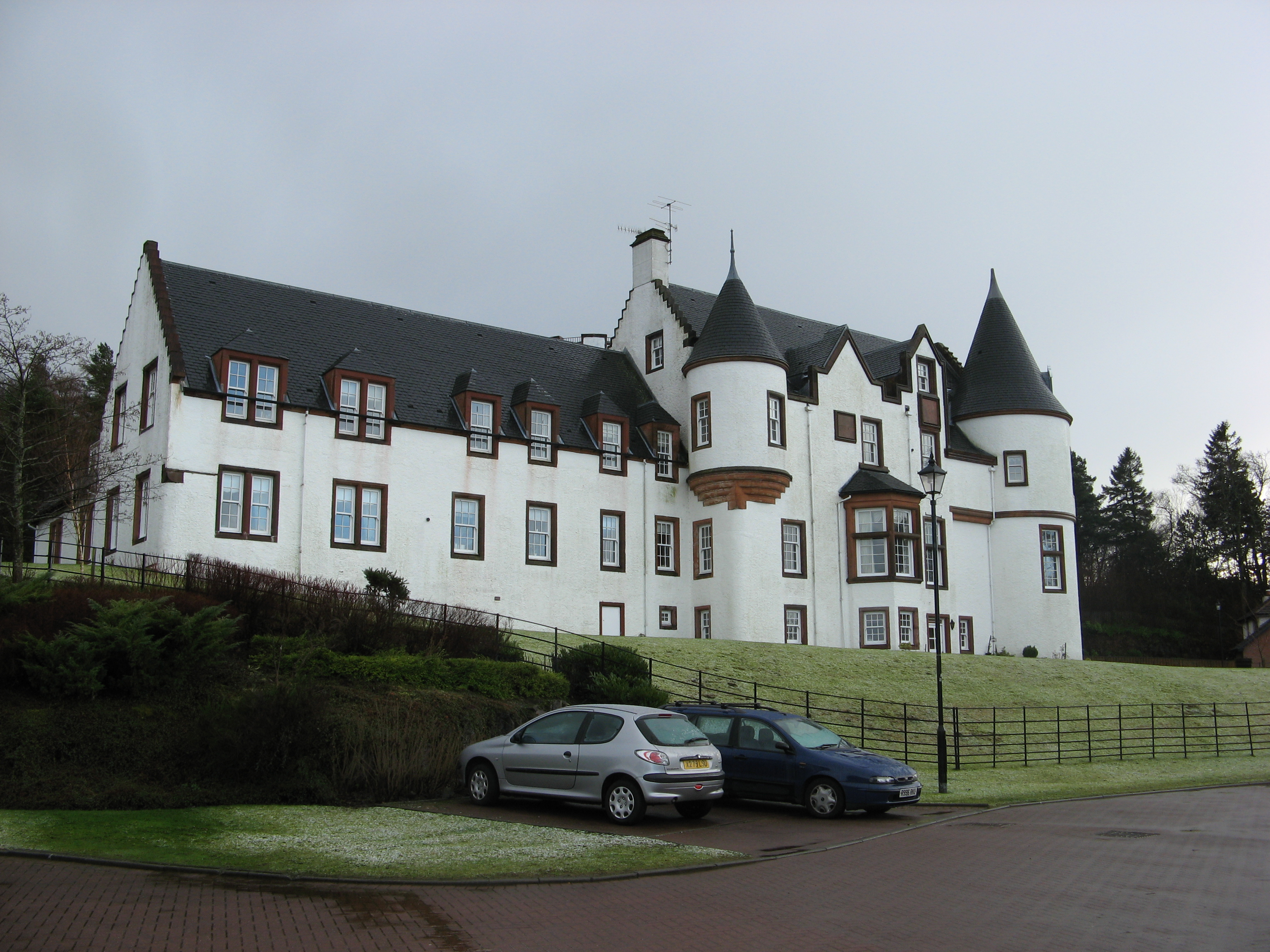
Auchenbothie House (1898), now converted into multiple residential flats.

A number of large private homes are also notable in the parish, which are also drawn from a wide variety of architectural styles. The village hosts a number of examples of the arts and crafts style, most notably 'Windy Hill' (c.1900), designed by Charles Rennie Mackintosh. This is one of a number of buildings Mackintosh was involved with in the village and alongside the Hill House is one of only two residential buildings wholly designed by him.

In the adjacent plot to Windyhill is James Salmon's 'Rowantreehill' of the same era, an unusual building which was designed by Salmon as a family home for his own use. James Salmon and Charles Rennie Mackintosh were friends and sharing influences a following of the Glasgow Style artistic movement. Both Salmon and Mackintosh went on to contribute more of their work to Kilmacolm, Salmon designing four more listed homes. Following William Leiper, the architect of St Columba's Church, being commissioned to design Auchenbothie House, Mackintosh was again recruited to design the building's gatehouse and to contribute to the expansion of nearby Cloak, all of which fell within the estate of Major Hugh Brown Collins, a mining engineer. Although Mackintosh planned for a tower to the constructed at Cloak, this was never executed. Auchenbothie House was donated by former owner Sir James Lithgow to the town council of nearby Port Glasgow in 1949 to be used as a home for the elderly; it later lay vacant before being converted into residential flats.

Other notable architects to have practiced in Kilmacolm include Sir John James Burnet whose works in the village include the Kidston Hall and the major late 19th-century renovation of Finlaystone House and James Austen Laird, who worked on numerous homes in the village. Also of significance are the former orphans' homes at Quarrier's Village, many of which are listed. The homes were designed individually according to the wishes of donors, mainly by Glasgow architect Robert A. Bryden. As previously mentioned, Bryden was also responsible for a number of the non-residential buildings in Quarrier's Village including Mount Zion Church, Elise Hospital and what became Bridge of Weir Hospital, the latter two having been converted into a home for the elderly and a residential development respectively.

=== Historic houses ===
Finlaystone House, a mansion house in the Baronial Revival style and former seat of the Earls of Glencairn, is Category A listed. The current building is mainly that constructed in 1760 around an earlier nucleus, and extensively added to and altered in the late 19th century. It is now seat of the Chief of the Clan MacMillan, with both building and grounds used for public events and visits.

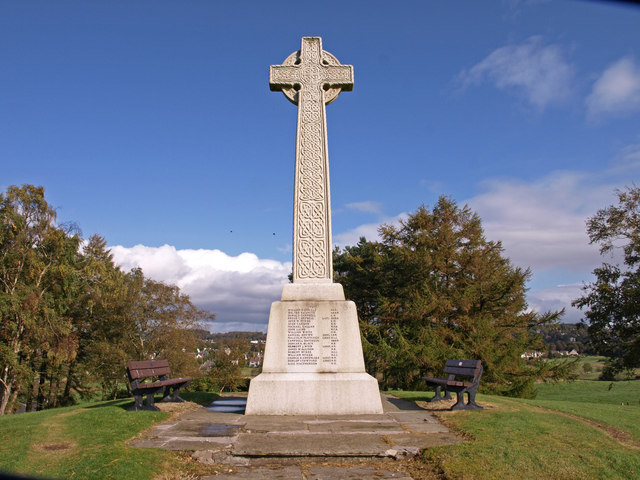
Kilmacolm's war memorial. Seventy-seven men from Kilmacolm were lost in the "Great War".

Duchal House, which was constructed from stone from the aforementioned (now ruined) Duchal Castle, is a Renaissance style country house originally built in 1710 and largely rebuilt c. 1768 incorporating some of the previous structure. It is now the seat of current Lord Maclay.

The third historic seat of Kilmacolm, Newark Castle, is no longer within the parish, having been incorporated into Port Glasgow. It is currently in the possession of Historic Scotland.

=== Monuments ===
Kilmacolm has a large Celtic cross-style war memorial sited on a hill to the south-east of the village. The land that it is built upon was donated for the purpose by the first Lord Maclay, who purchased Duchal House and its estates in 1915 and lost two sons in World War I. In addition to his work on buildings in the village, there is also a gravestone in the parish churchyard designed by Charles Rennie Mackintosh dated 1892 and erected to the memory of one James Reid.

A monument containing a time capsule is also present in the village centre, outside the old schoolhouse. It was created in 1985 to celebrate International Youth Year. A lion statue lies in Birkmyre Park.

== Transport ==
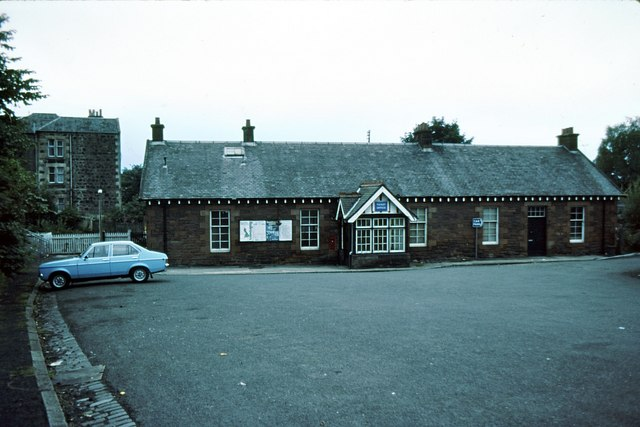
Kilmacolm railway station in 1979.

Kilmacolm is well connected by road, lying on the A761 between Greenock and Paisley a short distance from the link to the M8 motorway to Glasgow at Johnstone, and is thus popular with commuters. The Strathclyde Partnership for Transport, a public body, has direct operational responsibilities covering the area, such as supporting (and in some cases running) local bus services in Kilmacolm and across Strathclyde. Kilmacolm is served by the nearby Glasgow International Airport.

Kilmacolm railway station opened in 1869 and closed in 1983; the station building is now a public house. The railway played a significant role in the village's modern history and expansion, linking it conveniently to nearby urban centres such as Glasgow, Greenock and Paisley. Today, Kilmacolm's nearest National Rail link is at Port Glasgow railway station which lies on the Inverclyde Line linking Glasgow with Gourock and Wemyss Bay. The Ayrshire Coast Line, running between Glasgow and the south-west coast of Scotland, is accessible at nearby Lochwinnoch railway station.

The former railway track serving Kilmacolm has been converted into a cycle path, and is now part of the Clyde to Forth cycle route (National Cycle Route 75). The route of the line has been preserved, and has been confirmed by Strathclyde Partnership for Transport to be available for use again should future redevelopment of the line be considered.

== Education ==
There are currently two schools in Kilmacolm: Kilmacolm Primary School, a state primary school, and St Columba's School, an independent school offering both primary and secondary education. The nearest state secondary school in Inverclyde, which serves the village, is Port Glasgow High School.

The first schoolhouse was opened in the village in 1858. With the increase in population and the compulsory education introduced by the parish school board in 1889 under the Education (Scotland) Act 1872 the small building could no longer cope with demand and in 1888 a larger building was constructed adjacent to the old with accommodation for 600 pupils. In 1971, the school moved to a new site on Churchill Road, Pacemuir estate, and continues to exist as Kilmacolm Primary School, whilst the old schoolhouse is now used as the Cargill Centre, a community centre.

St Columba's School was founded in 1897 as an independent day school for girls. Since 1982, the school is fully coeducational, and the serves 730 pupils between its junior and senior schools. A further independent boys institution, Dardenne Preparatory School, opened in the village in 1909 and closed in 1982.

== Religion ==
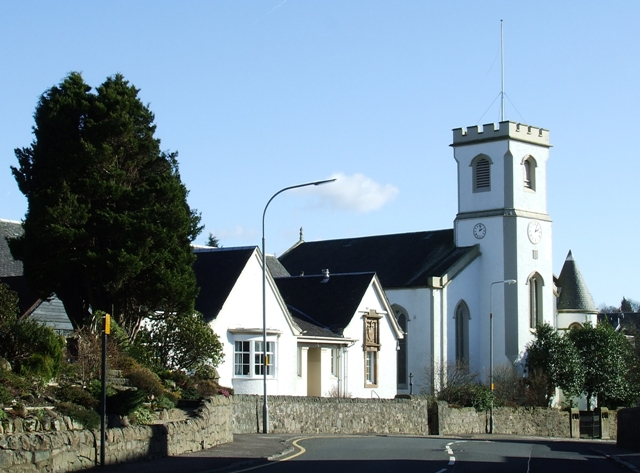
Kilmacolm Parish Church, the "Old Kirk", dating back to the 13th century on an ancient site of worship.

The Christian religion has had a significant impact in Kilmacolm's history. It was the site where John Knox performed what was possibly the first Protestant communion in Scotland. One of Samuel Rutherford's letters give a flavour of the parish in 1639. Kilmacolm was also a centre for Covenanters. The town was also known for the "Kilmacolm Preachings" reportedly often accompanied by drinking and 'riotous behaviour'.

There is currently one congregation of the presbyterian Church of Scotland, one Episcopal church which is part of the Anglican Communion and one Roman Catholic Church in the village. A further Church of Scotland congregation meets in Quarrier's Village.

The Parish Church, known as the "Old Kirk", is ancient in origin. Its chancel dates back to the 13th century and is incorporated into the modern structure, built in 1830 as a replacement for a structurally unsound 16th century main building, as the Murray Chapel.

In 1858, a number of the Parish's inhabitants broke away to form a United Presbyterian church in what had until recently been the abandoned Reformed Presbyterian Church. In 1868 the Church of St James was constructed on the site which now houses the Royal Bank of Scotland branch and lends its name to the town's main shopping terrace. There are no remains of this church today.

The congregation of St James's Church planned a new building in 1900, which was completed in 1903. This new Church of St James united with St Columba's Church, which was formed in the 1870s following another schism within the Church of Scotland. This former St Columba's Church stood on Bridge of Weir Road, and is recorded as standing in 1907 although the date of its construction is unknown. The magnificent spire and much of the church was demolished in the 1960s, but the main hall still remains and serves as the Kilmacolm Masonic Temple facing onto Glebe Road. The slates from the roof of the old church were used on the roof of "The Glen" being built at that time in Glencairn Road. When the church was demolished and the congregations of St Columba's and St James's united, the former St James's Church where they met was renamed St Columba's Church – recognising the origins of the village name and its relationship with Columba. Through various unions, this church became part of the Church of Scotland, alongside the Old Kirk. The two congregations united in 2024, with the Old Kirk being rebranded as Kilmacolm Parish Church and the St Columba's Church building put up for sale. The Church of Scotland churches locally form part of the Presbytery of Greenock and Paisley in the Synod of Clydesdale (see: Church of Scotland synods and presbyteries).

Kilmacolm forms part of the Episcopalian Diocese of Glasgow and Galloway. The Scottish Episcopal Church is a province of the Anglican Communion. It is served by St Fillan's Church on Moss Road and currently shares a Rector with two other nearby Episcopal congregations that together form the Renfrewshire Heartlands Group of churches.

The village also falls within the Roman Catholic Diocese of Paisley and Deanery of Inverclyde. There is one small Roman Catholic church in the village, St Colm's. Dedicated to St Columba, for whom St Colm is an alternative name, the current church building was constructed in 1995.

The ancient religious settlement of St Fillan's Kirk, Seat and Well lies between Kilmacolm and Houston at the hamlet of Killellan. The St Fillan to which it, and Kilmacolm's Episcopal Church, is dedicated is suggested by the Gazetteer for Scotland as most likely being "Faelan of Cluain Moescna" from Meath in Ireland.

== Public services ==
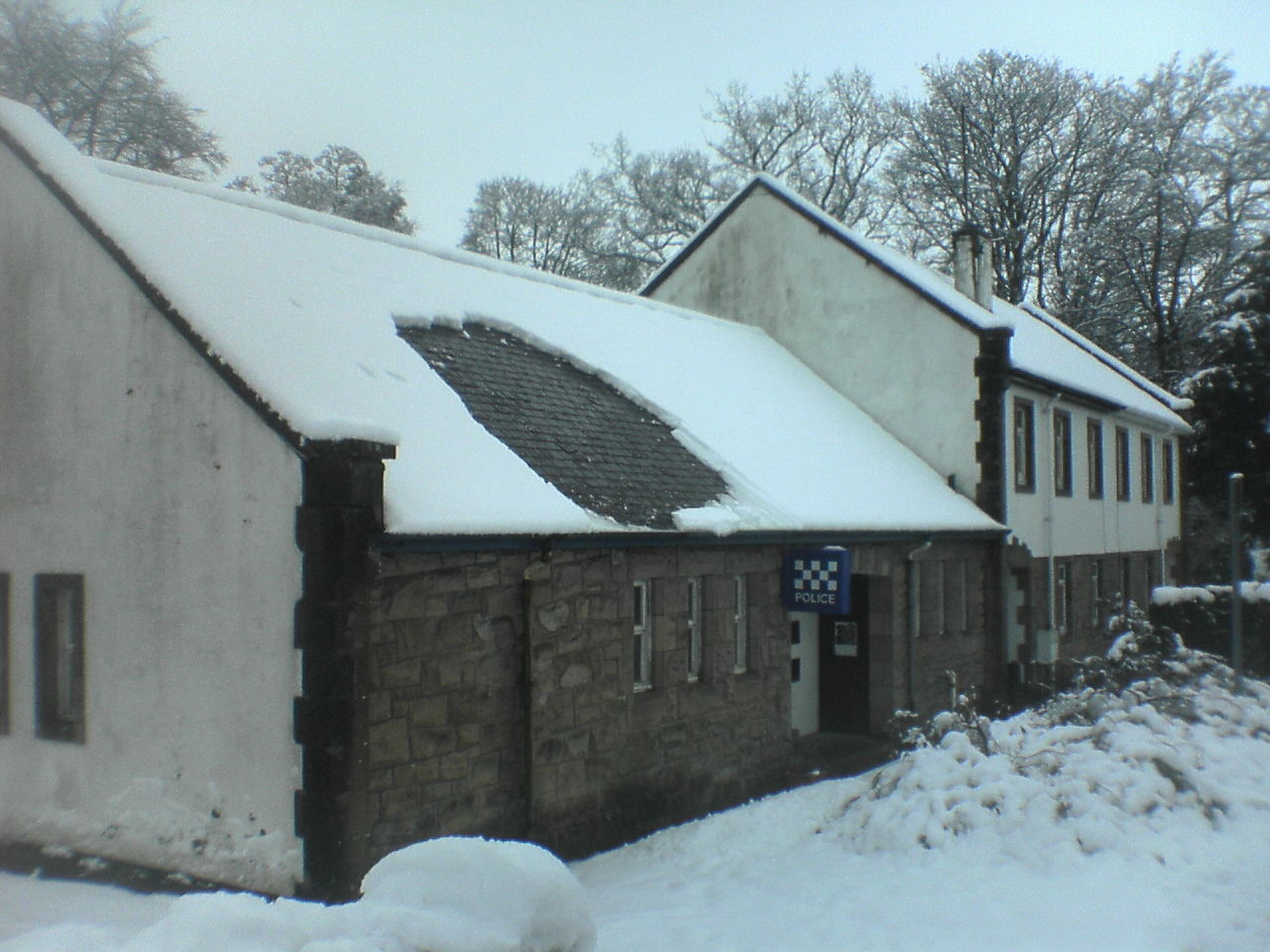
Kilmacolm's former police office and police houses in early 2010.

The territorial police force covering Kilmacolm is the Police Service of Scotland, with Kilmacolm falling within its Renfrewshire and Inverclyde division, which is further subdivided into three area commands – in this case, Inverclyde. In 2011, the village police office was closed with a facility opened in the refurbished Cargill Centre. Following a review of the policing estate across Scotland, the police counter was announced as earmarked for closure in 2016. For judicial purposes, the area forms part of the sheriffdom of North Strathclyde and public prosecutions are directed by the Procurator Fiscal for Argyll and Clyde. The Scottish Fire and Rescue Service is the statutory fire and rescue service covering the Kilmacolm area, the nearest station being at Port Glasgow.

NHS Greater Glasgow and Clyde is the National Health Service Board providing public health care in Kilmacolm. The village also falls within the Inverclyde Community Health Partnership area – an organisation which plans and delivers a number of NHS services. Within the village itself, there are two general practitioner's surgeries. The nearest major hospitals with accident and emergency facilities are the Inverclyde Royal Hospital in Greenock and Royal Alexandra Hospital in Paisley. Bridge of Weir Hospital, opened as the Bridge of Weir Hospital for Consumptives in 1896, was based in Quarrier's Village until its closure in 2004, latterly chiefly serving chronic and geriatric patients.

Water and sewerage is provided in Kilmacolm by Scottish Water, a public body, and water and sewerage charges are collected alongside council tax by Inverclyde Council, the local authority, on its behalf. Inverclyde Council is also responsible for the provision of waste management in the area. Kilmacolm's distribution network operator, the organisation licensed to transmit electricity from the National Grid to consumers, is Scottish Power.
