= List of listed buildings in Edinburgh/15 =

This is a list of listed buildings in Edinburgh, Scotland.

== List ==
Name	Location	Date listed	Grid ref. (Note: Sometimes known as OSGB36, the grid reference (where provided) is based on the British national grid reference system used by the Ordnance Survey. • "Guide to National Grid". Ordnance Survey. • "Get-a-map". Ordnance Survey.)	Geo-coordinates	Notes	LB number (Note: Historic Environment Scotland assign a unique alphanumeric identifier to each designated site in Scotland, for listed buildings this always begins with "LB", for example "LB12345".)	Image
Carlton Street 4-16				55°57′25″N 3°12′39″W	Category A	28459	Upload Photo
39-43 (Odd Nos) North Castle Street With Railings				55°57′11″N 3°12′12″W	Category A	28464	Upload Photo
57-61 (Odd Nos) North Castle Street With Railings				55°57′13″N 3°12′13″W	Category A	28467	Upload Photo
42-46 (Even Nos) North Castle Street With Railings And Lamp Standard				55°57′11″N 3°12′16″W	Category A	28477	Upload Photo
13-24 (Inclusive Nos) Brunton Place And 1 Brunton Terrace				55°57′28″N 3°10′24″W	Category B	28374	Upload another image
55 And 56 Bruntsfield Place Including Boundary Walls				55°56′19″N 3°12′20″W	Category B	28377	Upload Photo
65 Bruntsfield Place Including Boundary Walls				55°56′19″N 3°12′20″W	Category B	28378	Upload Photo
Buccleuch Place 4				55°56′34″N 3°11′07″W	Category B	28380	Upload Photo
Buccleuch Place 30-35				55°56′35″N 3°11′10″W	Category B	28391	Upload Photo
10,12 Buccleuch Street				55°56′36″N 3°11′07″W	Category B	28398	Upload Photo
20 And 22 Calton Hill Including Railings, Gatepiers And Boundary Wall				55°57′16″N 3°11′09″W	Category B	28408	Upload Photo
2-7 (Inclusive Nos) Cambridge Street, Including Boundary Wall And Railings				55°56′53″N 3°12′18″W	Category B	28413	Upload another image
58-64 (Even Nos) Candlemaker Row				55°56′50″N 3°11′32″W	Category C(S)	28419	Upload Photo
50-54 (Even Nos) Candlemaker Row				55°56′50″N 3°11′31″W	Category B	28420	Upload Photo
7 And 9 Brighton Street				55°56′47″N 3°11′23″W	Category B	28352	Upload Photo
15 North Bank Street				55°56′59″N 3°11′40″W	Category A	28265	Upload Photo
16 North Bank Street				55°56′59″N 3°11′40″W	Category A	28266	Upload Photo
17 Blacket Place, Including Boundary Walls				55°56′09″N 3°10′26″W	Category B	28303	Upload Photo
2, 4 Alva Street, 15, 17 Queensferry Street				55°57′03″N 3°12′36″W	Category A	28238	Upload Photo
28, 30, 32 Alva Street Including Railings				55°57′01″N 3°12′40″W	Category A	28240	Upload Photo
Annandale Street, Central Garage (Lothian Region Transport)				55°57′40″N 3°11′17″W	Category B	28251	Upload Photo
2-7 (Inclusive Nos) Abercromby Place, Including Railings And Lamp				55°57′24″N 3°11′38″W	Category A	28210	Upload Photo
27-33 (Odd Nos) Albany Street, Including Railings				55°57′26″N 3°11′27″W	Category A	28224	Upload Photo
8-16 (Even Nos) Albany Street, Including Railings				55°57′26″N 3°11′35″W	Category A	28229	Upload Photo
56 Albany Street, Including Railings				55°57′28″N 3°11′23″W	Category B	28233	Upload Photo
124 Whitehouse Road, Whitehouse, Including Sundial, Outbuilding, Pillar, Arch And Boundary Wall				55°58′00″N 3°18′30″W	Category B	28128	Upload Photo
14-21 (Inclusive) Dowie's Mill Lane Cottages				55°58′00″N 3°18′58″W	Category C(S)	28165	Upload Photo
20 Brae Park Road, Riverbank Cottage				55°57′55″N 3°18′55″W	Category C(S)	28166	Upload Photo
77 Howden Hall Road				55°54′01″N 3°09′46″W	Category C(S)	28182	Upload Photo
Cramond Road South, Cramond House Gateway And Lodges				55°58′26″N 3°17′20″W	Category B	28050	Upload Photo
Drylaw House, Walled Garden				55°57′51″N 3°15′14″W	Category C(S)	28061	Upload Photo
17 Winton Loan, Including Ancillary Structures				55°53′52″N 3°11′42″W	Category B	28095	Upload Photo
Frogston Road East, Mortonhall House, Stable Court And Granary				55°54′13″N 3°10′54″W	Category B	28097	Upload Photo
Holyroodhouse Sundial, North Garden				55°57′13″N 3°10′23″W	Category A	28030	Upload another image
4, 5 & 6 Belmont Drive, (Belmont House), Including Boundary Wall, Gatepiers, Garden Ornaments And Coach House (1 Belmont Drive)				55°56′50″N 3°15′07″W	Category A	28032	Upload Photo
Brunstane Road South, Brunstane House Steading, And Brunstane Farm Cottages (35-45 Odd Numbers)				55°56′23″N 3°05′40″W	Category B	28035	Upload Photo
15 And 17 Pilrig Street With Boundary Walls And Railings				55°57′54″N 3°10′45″W	Category B	27926	Upload Photo
Inverleith Park Gatepiers Arboretum Road				55°57′52″N 3°12′48″W	Category B	27927	Upload another image
St Bernard's Bridge Dean Terrace				55°57′23″N 3°12′38″W	Category B	27948	Upload another image
Swanston Road, Water House				55°53′41″N 3°13′12″W	Category B	27965	Upload Photo
Colinton Road, Merchiston Castle School, Chalmers House				55°54′44″N 3°15′17″W	Category B	27983	Upload another image
Colinton Road, Merchiston Castle School South Lodge, Boundary Wall, Gatepiers And Gates				55°54′36″N 3°15′02″W	Category C(S)	27984	Upload Photo
Colinton Road, Merchiston Castle School, Former Stables				55°54′36″N 3°15′05″W	Category B	27985	Upload Photo
Calton Hill, Off Regent Road, Dugald Stewart's Monument				55°57′16″N 3°11′04″W	Category A	27835	Upload another image
23 And 25 Pilrig Street With Boundary Wall And Railings				55°57′55″N 3°10′46″W	Category B	27852	Upload Photo
4 Shore And 6 Tower Street, George Brown Engineering Works				55°58′39″N 3°10′08″W	Category B	27887	Upload Photo
East Crosscauseway, Wellhead				55°56′38″N 3°10′54″W	Category C(S)	27898	Upload another image See more images
48 Timberbush				55°58′34″N 3°10′05″W	Category B	27904	Upload Photo
52-57 (Inclusive Nos) Timberbush				55°58′35″N 3°10′08″W	Category B	27908	Upload Photo
Queen's Drive, St Margaret's Well				55°57′03″N 3°10′06″W	Category B	27909	Upload another image
20-26 (Even Nos) Straiton Place 'Bellfield'				55°57′11″N 3°06′31″W	Category C(S)	27742	Upload Photo
314 And 316 Leith Walk				55°57′54″N 3°10′37″W	Category C(S)	27747	Upload Photo
Ratho Village, 50 Main Street And Boundary Wall				55°55′19″N 3°22′47″W	Category C(S)	27765	Upload Photo
13 And 15 West Brighton Crescent				55°57′05″N 3°07′11″W	Category B	27766	Upload Photo
2-4 (Inclusive) Links Gardens And 35 Salamander Place With Boundary Walls And Railings				55°58′20″N 3°09′45″W	Category B	27767	Upload Photo
17 And 19 West Brighton Crescent				55°57′06″N 3°07′11″W	Category B	27770	Upload Photo
Nicolson Street, Surgeon's Hall Including Screen Wall, Gates, Railings And Lamp Standards				55°56′48″N 3°11′06″W	Category A	27772	Upload another image See more images
Cambridge Street, Usher Hall, Including Sculpture And Standard Lamps				55°56′51″N 3°12′18″W	Category A	27780	Upload another image
Ratho Village, 2 Wilkieston Road, West End Cottage And Boundary Walls				55°55′14″N 3°23′09″W	Category C(S)	27785	Upload Photo
Union Canal, Mid Hermiston Bridge, Bridge No 11				55°55′10″N 3°19′18″W	Category B	27802	Upload Photo
7 Windsor Place				55°57′07″N 3°06′47″W	Category B	27803	Upload Photo
9 Windsor Place				55°57′06″N 3°06′47″W	Category B	27807	Upload Photo
13, 15 And 17 Windsor Place				55°57′05″N 3°06′47″W	Category B	27811	Upload Photo
Calton Hill, Off Regent Road, National Monument				55°57′17″N 3°10′55″W	Category A	27820	Upload another image
4 And 6 Nile Grove				55°55′34″N 3°12′28″W	Category B	27678	Upload another image
8 Nile Grove				55°55′34″N 3°12′26″W	Category B	27683	Upload another image
60 And 62 Leith Walk With Boundary Walls, Lamp Standards And Railings				55°58′11″N 3°10′24″W	Category B	27687	Upload Photo
Ratho Village, 27 Baird Road, Bridge Inn				55°55′24″N 3°22′44″W	Category C(S)	27695	Upload another image See more images
5 Tipperlinn Road				55°55′52″N 3°12′57″W	Category B	27698	Upload another image
Ratho Village, 2 Baird Road And Wall				55°55′21″N 3°22′40″W	Category B	27705	Upload Photo
2A Rosefield Place, St James Parish Church (Church Of Scotland), Including Gatepiers And Boundary Walls				55°57′07″N 3°07′01″W	Category B	27706	Upload Photo
Ratho Village, 4 And 6 Baird Road, Primrose Cottage And Summerhall Cottage With Walls And Gatepiers				55°55′21″N 3°22′40″W	Category B	27710	Upload Photo
Ratho Village, 8 And 10 Baird Road, With Wall And Gatepiers				55°55′21″N 3°22′40″W	Category B	27715	Upload Photo
5-8 (Inclusive Nos) Sandford Gardens				55°57′06″N 3°06′54″W	Category B	27721	Upload Photo
1-11 (Odd Nos) Straiton Place, 51 Bath Street				55°57′15″N 3°06′36″W	Category B	27726	Upload Photo
280-284 (Even Nos) Leith Walk				55°57′56″N 3°10′35″W	Category C(S)	27727	Upload Photo
Ratho Village, 4 Freelands Road (Former Manse) And Boundary Wall				55°55′30″N 3°22′46″W	Category B	27729	Upload Photo
14 Straiton Place				55°57′13″N 3°06′33″W	Category B	27730	Upload Photo
296 Leith Walk				55°57′55″N 3°10′36″W	Category C(S)	27731	Upload Photo
16 Straiton Place				55°57′13″N 3°06′32″W	Category B	27734	Upload Photo
108, 110, 112 Morningside Road And 1A Albert Terrace, Bank House, With Boundary Walls, Gatepiers And Railings				55°55′53″N 3°12′38″W	Category B	27602	Upload Photo
Calton Hill, City Observatory, Including City Dome, Cox Dome, Tweedie Dome, Crawford Dome, Transit House, And Compound Walls				55°57′18″N 3°11′01″W	Category A	27603	Upload another image See more images
Newliston House, The Garden House				55°56′41″N 3°25′47″W	Category C(S)	27604	Upload Photo
5 Newbattle Terrace With Gazebo And Boundary Wall				55°55′53″N 3°12′27″W	Category B	27635	Upload Photo
Leith Docks, Tower Place, Harbour And Dock Offices				55°58′43″N 3°10′04″W	Category C(S)	27639	Upload Photo
7 Newbattle Terrace				55°55′53″N 3°12′24″W	Category C(S)	27640	Upload Photo
288-292 (Even Nos) Portobello High Street, 2 Bellfield Lane				55°57′06″N 3°06′33″W	Category C(S)	27506	Upload Photo
170-174 (Even Nos) Great Junction Street And 1-6 (Inclusive Nos) Taylor Gardens				55°58′26″N 3°10′36″W	Category B	27517	Upload Photo
348-350 Castlehill, The Hub Festival Centre				55°56′56″N 3°11′43″W	Category A	27542	Upload another image See more images
17 And 19 Regent Street				55°57′10″N 3°06′42″W	Category C(S)	27544	Upload Photo
35-39 (Odd Nos) Regent Street (Marionville) Including Piers Boundary Walls And Railings				55°57′12″N 3°06′40″W	Category C(S)	27554	Upload Photo
41 Regent Street				55°57′13″N 3°06′39″W	Category C(S)	27559	Upload Photo
54 George Street And 53A Rose Street, Assembly Rooms And Music Hall				55°57′10″N 3°11′55″W	Category A	27567	Upload another image
49 Regent Street				55°57′14″N 3°06′37″W	Category C(S)	27569	Upload Photo
Ingliston House Stables And Gardener's House				55°56′28″N 3°22′11″W	Category A	27451	Upload Photo
123 Great Junction Street, St Thomas Junction Road Parish Church				55°58′20″N 3°10′31″W	Category B	27473	Upload Photo
14 Jordan Lane				55°55′38″N 3°12′22″W	Category B	27484	Upload Photo
204-208 (Even Nos) Great Junction Street Mecca State Social Club, Known As 205				55°58′30″N 3°10′40″W	Category B	27487	Upload Photo
Kirkliston Village, 25-27 (Odd Nos) High Street, Castle House				55°57′14″N 3°24′07″W	Category B	27499	Upload Photo
66 Polwarth Terrace With Boundary Wall And Gates				55°55′55″N 3°13′32″W	Category B	27363	Upload Photo
34 And 36 Marlborough Street				55°57′12″N 3°06′35″W	Category B	27364	Upload Photo
5B York Place, Former St George's Chapel (Episcopal), Including Railings And Lamps				55°57′21″N 3°11′31″W	Category A	27374	Upload Photo
87 Portland Street With Porch, Front Walls And Railings; Eh6 4Ay				55°58′34″N 3°11′03″W	Category C(S)	27375	Upload Photo
Heriot-Watt University, Riccarton Estate, Former Walled Garden				55°54′35″N 3°19′01″W	Category B	27383	Upload Photo
108 And 110 Even Nos Polwarth Terrace				55°55′47″N 3°13′39″W	Category C(S)	27384	Upload Photo
2 And 4 Greenhill Park				55°55′59″N 3°12′32″W	Category B	27387	Upload Photo
170-174 (Even Nos) Constitution Street				55°58′15″N 3°10′17″W	Category C(S)	27392	Upload Photo
St James The Less Church (Episcopal) Inverleith Row, Goldenacre				55°58′14″N 3°12′32″W	Category B	27394	Upload another image See more images
16 Greenhill Park With Boundary Wall, Gatepiers, Gateposts And Railings				55°56′01″N 3°12′25″W	Category B	27400	Upload Photo
45/1,2,3,4-47 (Odd Numbers) Spylaw Road And Boundary Wall And 5 Mid Gillsland Road				55°55′53″N 3°13′17″W	Category B	27404	Upload another image
17 Duke Street And 3 Academy Street				55°58′13″N 3°10′14″W	Category C(S)	27406	Upload Photo
79-83 (Odd Nos) Duke Street				55°58′11″N 3°10′07″W	Category B	27419	Upload Photo
50 Spylaw Road				55°55′55″N 3°13′16″W	Category C(S)	27430	Upload another image
221 Portobello High Street, Formerly Windsor Place Church				55°57′05″N 3°06′44″W	Category C(S)	27431	Upload Photo
Palmerston Place, Cathedral Church Of St. Mary (Episcopal)				55°56′54″N 3°13′00″W	Category A	27441	Upload another image
9 Polwarth Terrace				55°56′10″N 3°13′01″W	Category C(S)	27321	Upload another image
43 And 45 Marlborough Street (Raefield And Moss Cottage)				55°57′13″N 3°06′36″W	Category C(S)	27329	Upload Photo
1 And 3 Greenhill Gardens				55°56′09″N 3°12′23″W	Category B	27331	Upload Photo
14 Johnston Terrace, St Columba By The Castle Episcopal Church, With Retaining Wall And Terraced Garden				55°56′54″N 3°11′43″W	Category B	27332	Upload another image
3 (1-10) Portland Street With Front Wall And Railings; Eh6 4Sx				55°58′41″N 3°10′52″W	Category B	27333	Upload Photo
35 (1F, 2F & 3F) And 37 Portland Street With Front Walls, Steps And Railings; Eh6 4Bb				55°58′38″N 3°10′56″W	Category B	27340	Upload Photo
Glasgow Road, Norton Mains, Steading And Garden Walls				55°56′03″N 3°22′06″W	Category C(S)	27229	Upload Photo
121-125 (Odd Nos) Constitution Street And Warehouse				55°58′20″N 3°10′07″W	Category B	27233	Upload Photo
283 Portobello High Street				55°57′03″N 3°06′34″W	Category B	27237	Upload Photo
Queen Street Church (St Andrews Parish Church Halls) 42, 43 Queen Street				55°57′15″N 3°12′07″W	Category B	27242	Upload Photo
77 Falcon Avenue, St Peter's Church (Rc), Church Offices And Presbytery With Boundary Wall, Gatepiers And Railings				55°55′50″N 3°12′22″W	Category A	27257	Upload Photo
14 East Brighton Crescent				55°57′02″N 3°07′02″W	Category B	27263	Upload Photo
173 And 177-181 Constitution Street And 7, 7B, 9, 9A, 11 And 13 Duke Street, Former Palace Cinema				55°58′14″N 3°10′15″W	Category C(S)	27281	Upload Photo
18 Cluny Place And 18 Cluny Avenue				55°55′34″N 3°12′05″W	Category B	27156	Upload Photo
20 Merchiston Avenue And 1 Polwarth Terrace				55°56′12″N 3°12′55″W	Category B	27161	Upload Photo
Newhaven Road, Bonnington Bridge				55°58′18″N 3°11′15″W	Category B	27168	Upload Photo
53-61 (Odd Nos) Colinton Road				55°55′55″N 3°12′55″W	Category C(S)	27175	Upload Photo
106 Newhaven Road With Front Wall; Eh6 4Br				55°58′24″N 3°11′17″W	Category B	27177	Upload Photo
59-65 (Odd Nos) Constitution Street With Railings				55°58′27″N 3°10′02″W	Category B	27183	Upload Photo
69 And 71 Constitution Street, Former St John's East Church (C Of S)				55°58′26″N 3°10′02″W	Category C(S)	27192	Upload Photo
1 And 2 East Brighton Crescent				55°57′03″N 3°06′51″W	Category B	27200	Upload Photo
89 Constitution Street				55°58′24″N 3°10′04″W	Category B	27201	Upload Photo
1-5 (Odd Nos) Madeira Street With Front Walls And Railings; Eh6 4Aj				55°58′31″N 3°10′54″W	Category C(S)	27101	Upload Photo
1-8 (Inclusive Nos) Vanburgh Place With Boundary Walls				55°58′08″N 3°10′00″W	Category B	27105	Upload Photo
2A And 3 Casselbank Street				55°58′12″N 3°10′24″W	Category C(S)	27117	Upload Photo
Harrison Road Road Bridge				55°56′02″N 3°13′28″W	Category C(S)	27123	Upload another image
20 And 22 Main Street, Including Grey Horse Inn				55°53′02″N 3°20′21″W	Category C(S)	27124	Upload Photo
51 Madeira Street, North Leith Parish Church With Burial Enclosure, Hall And Beadle's House, (1A Madeira Place) Gates, Railings And Boundary Wall; Eh6 4Ax				55°58′33″N 3°10′59″W	Category A	27134	Upload Photo
5 Pittville Street				55°57′05″N 3°06′26″W	Category C(S)	27136	Upload Photo
1-15 (Odd Nos) Cluny Place				55°55′35″N 3°12′03″W	Category B	27141	Upload Photo
Glasgow Road, Gogar Mount Stables And Dovecot				55°56′05″N 3°21′03″W	Category B	27143	Upload Photo
7 Pittville Street				55°57′05″N 3°06′26″W	Category C(S)	27144	Upload Photo
26-30 (Even Nos) Madeira Street (Formerly Kyle Place) With Front Wall, Railings And Gates; Eh6 4Al				55°58′32″N 3°10′54″W	Category C(S)	27149	Upload Photo
Glasgow Road, Gogar Mount House, Walled Garden With Wellhead				55°56′04″N 3°21′00″W	Category C(S)	27150	Upload Photo
1 And 3 Joppa Road, Including Boundary Walls				55°56′57″N 3°06′07″W	Category B	27022	Upload Photo

== Key ==
The scheme for classifying buildings in Scotland is:

- Category A: "buildings of national or international importance, either architectural or historic; or fine, little-altered examples of some particular period, style or building type."
- Category B: "buildings of regional or more than local importance; or major examples of some particular period, style or building type, which may have been altered."
- Category C: "buildings of local importance; lesser examples of any period, style, or building type, as originally constructed or moderately altered; and simple traditional buildings which group well with other listed buildings."

In March 2016 there were 47,288 listed buildings in Scotland. Of these, 8% were Category A, and 50% were Category B, with the remaining 42% being Category C.

== See also ==
- List of listed buildings in Edinburgh
