= St Fillan's Kirk, Seat and Well =

Coordinates: 55.886324°N 4.5875469°W

St Fillan's Kirk, Seat and Well: Scottish Gaelic: Faolan
- Location within Renfrewshire
- OS grid reference: NS 38261 68936
- Civil parish: Houston and Killellan
- Council area: Renfrewshire
- Lieutenancy area: Renfrewshire
- Country: Scotland
- Sovereign state: United Kingdom
- Postcode district: PA6
- Dialling code: 01505
- Police: Scotland
- Fire: Scottish
- Ambulance: Scottish
- UK Parliament: Paisley and Renfrewshire North
- Scottish Parliament: Renfrewshire North and West Renfrewshire South

St Fillan's Kirk, Seat and Well are located in the hamlet of Kilallan, once the main religious centre of the ancient parish of Kilallan (Cill Fhaolain) or Killellan, close to Kilmacolm, Renfrewshire, Scotland. The old parish was united with Houston in 1760, although the church saw occasional use until 1771. The ruins of the kirk are a scheduled monument and the surrounding graveyard is a Listed Building. The ruins stand some 4 miles (6 km) west of the centre of Houston, just off the Kilallan Road.

== History ==
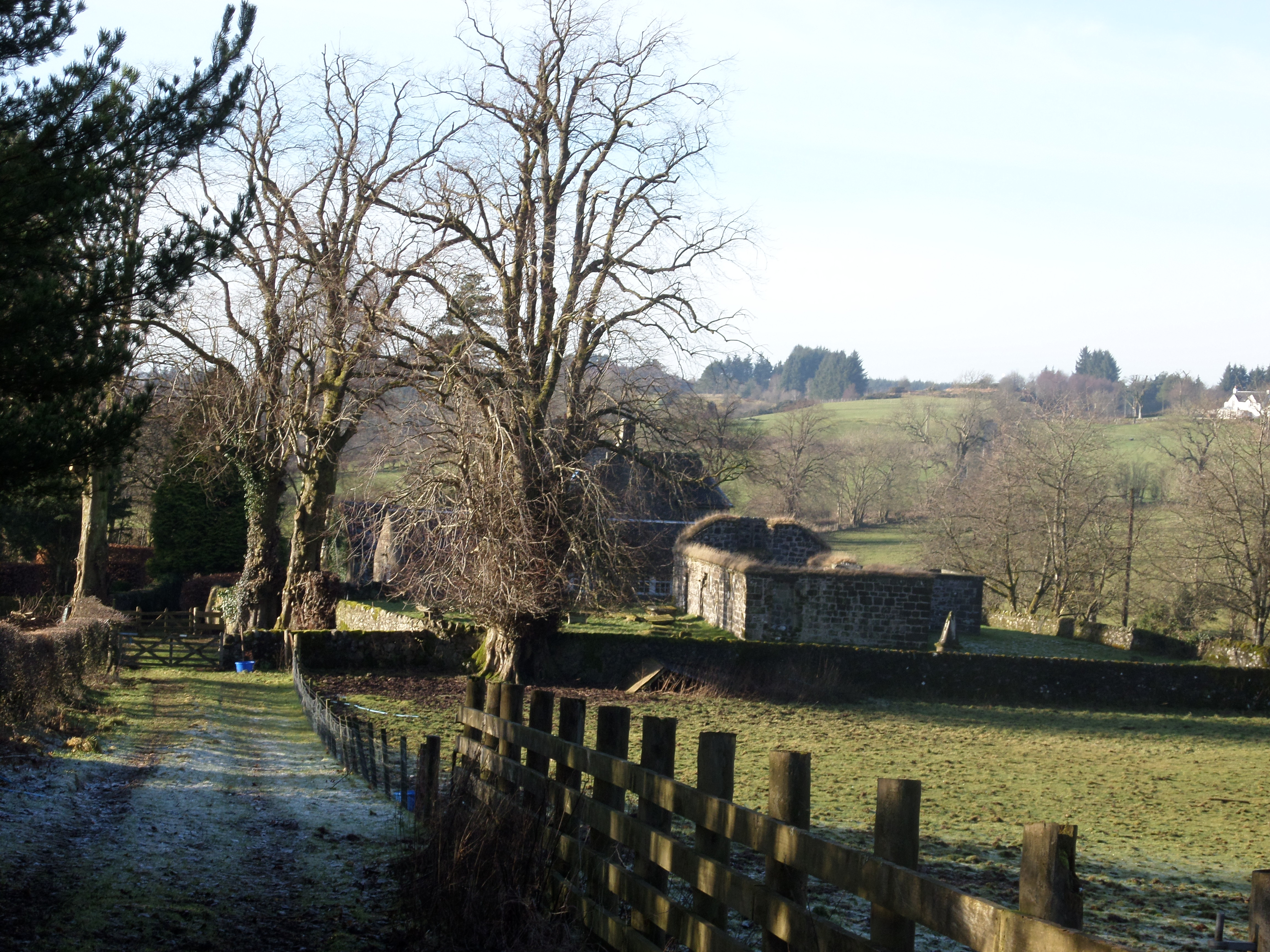
The kirk and access lane

Various other spellings are used for the old parish (Kilfillan, Kylhelan, Killilellin, Kyllinan, Kilenan, Kilellan and Killallan), Kilallan will be used here for consistency. The location was the circa seventh century site of the cell of a St Fillan, probably a follower of Saint Columba, who was held in such reverence that his arm bone was one of the holy relics paraded in front of the Scots Army at Bannockburn. His name in Gaelic means 'little wolf' and his feast day was 9 January. The cult of St Fillan's was introduced by Irish immigrants and the church one of several that Walter fitz Alan, Steward of Scotland gifted to Paisley Abbey in 1169, a foundation that he himself established. Several other St Fillan's sites with churches, wells, seats, etc. exist in elsewhere in Scotland. St Fillan is the patron saint of the mentally ill.

=== Covenanters ===
In 1781, it is recorded that the kirk was being used for services by the Cameronians, a radical faction of Scottish Covenanters from Sanquhar who followed the teachings of Richard Cameron. The followers were also known as "Society Men", "Sanquharians," and even "Hillmen" as they used remote sites to hold Conventicles, for example, it is known that the isolated Kirkbride Kirk in Nithsdale was un-roofed in an attempt to deter its use by Covenanters.

== The old kirk and churchyard ==
The present parish of Houston and Killellan dates from 1771 when the two parishes of Houston and Killellan were joined. The former parish kirk in the nearby hamlet of Kilallan was known as the Church of St Fillan which gives the hamlet its name. The former church building was left redundant by the unification and was abandoned and un-roofed some time after 1791. The Barochan Aisle on the north side of the Kirk is the burial place of the Flemings of nearby Barochan Castle, feudal superiors and heritors of the kirk. The ruin carries two datestones; the oldest is dated 1635. However, the present building is much older, dating back to at least the 10th or 11th century, affirmed by the ancient rectangular shape of the kirk. This scheduled monument is now in the care of the Kilallan Kirk Preservation Trust following its donation in 2005 by the Elderslie Estates. An annual service at St Fillan's is held amongst the ruins by the minister and congregation of the united parish.

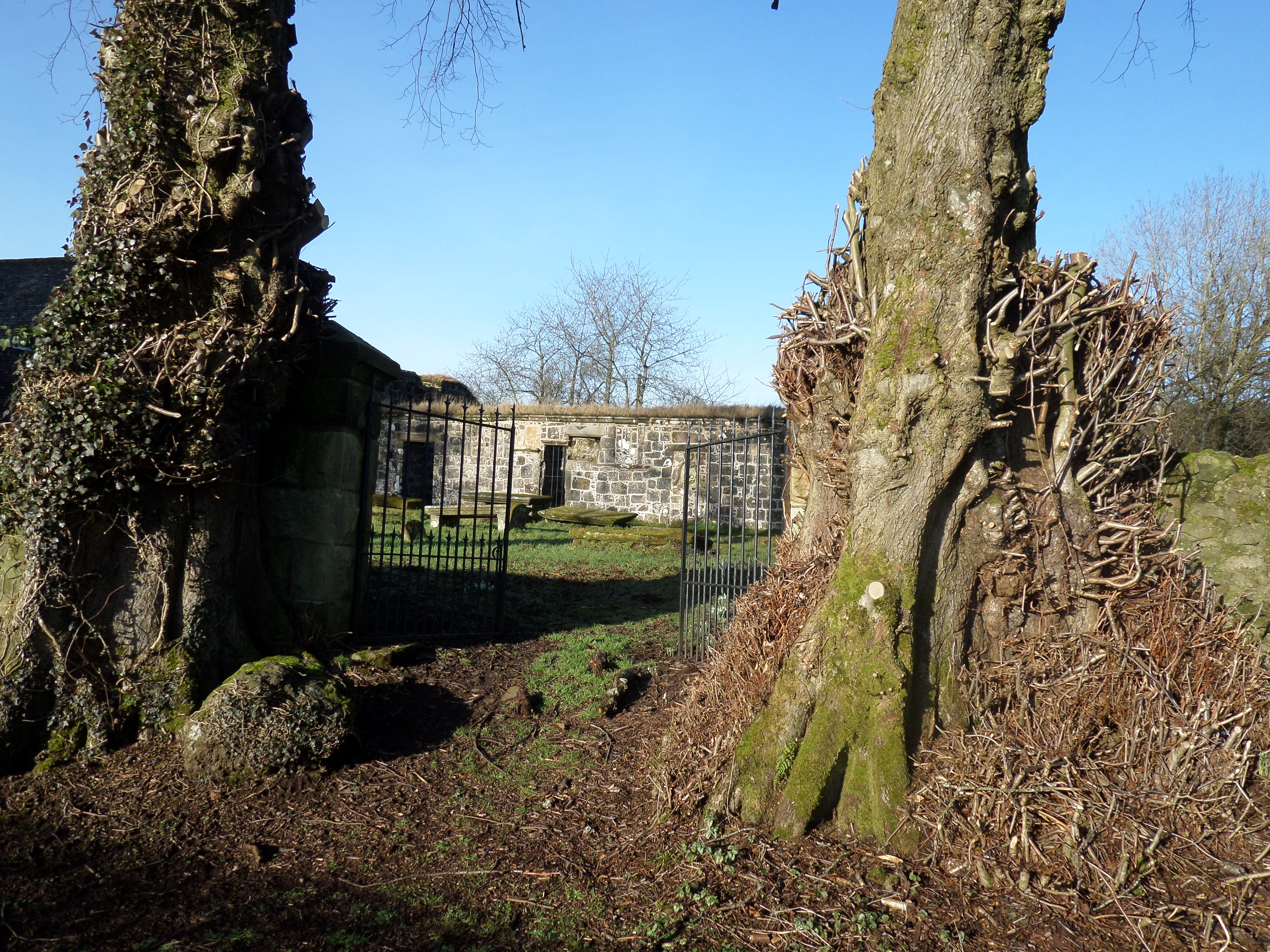
The entrance to the old kirk and churchyard.

The north and south-facing doors may have been the original design of the present building. However, 17th and 18th century alterations resulted in doors and windows being blocked up with old tombstones, etc. and a new door dated 1635 located on the south wall reflecting post-reformation protocols. A square hole to the left of the door marks the site of the old parish jougs that were stolen, discovered by chance and donated to a local museum who have yet to locate them. A story is told of a woman of short stature who, having committed some misdemeanor, had the jougs placed around her neck so that she would suffer public humiliation. However, she fell off the box she was made to stand on and the short chain resulted in her strangulation.

The church bell bears the inscription "CAROLVS HOG ME FECIT 1618" although it was recast in 1844. It was removed from the kirk and hung in a tree at Barochan House, home of the Flemings of the Fleming Aisle, seeing daily use. The bell is now kept in the parish church and rung once a year before the annual service on the first Sunday in July, the saint's feast day.

A 6th century bronze Byzantine coin and a pewter crucifix of medieval date were found in amongst the ruins of the church. A part of a knight's gravestone, bearing part of a sword, has been found built into the church walls.

The abandoned church saw some degree of maintenance over the years and in 1955, the walls were in good condition and showed signs of being cared for. The church interior was used for burials in the 19th century with the addition of the Barochan Aisle, iron railings partitioning off the east end and plaques mounted on the walls in several places. However, the effect of the elements in this exposed location together with plant growth was causing serious damage and an extensive restoration project was undertaken and completed by 2014.

=== Churchyard ===
The graveyard surrounding the church was still in use as late as 1856. The old font is recorded to have been built into the boundary wall of the cemetery. Grave recording has identified 58 grave monuments and two possible grave footings and resistivity work located on an earlier wall that was oval and therefore in keeping with ancient churchyards.

=== The manse ===
The church's manse, now Kilallan Farm or House, immediately adjacent to St Fillan's, is considered to be the oldest existing dwellinghouse in Renfrewshire. It had a stable and a byre now converted and was sold around 1771 by the heritors, its condition being recorded as 'bad' in the first Statistical Account. It had a typical loupin stane much used by the minister of the old Kirk to mount his horse. In 1950, a visitor recorded that the old glebe field was exceptionally fertile in comparison with other parcels of land in the area and was traditionally regarded as being the old kitchen garden of the pre-Reformation priests.

=== Ministers ===
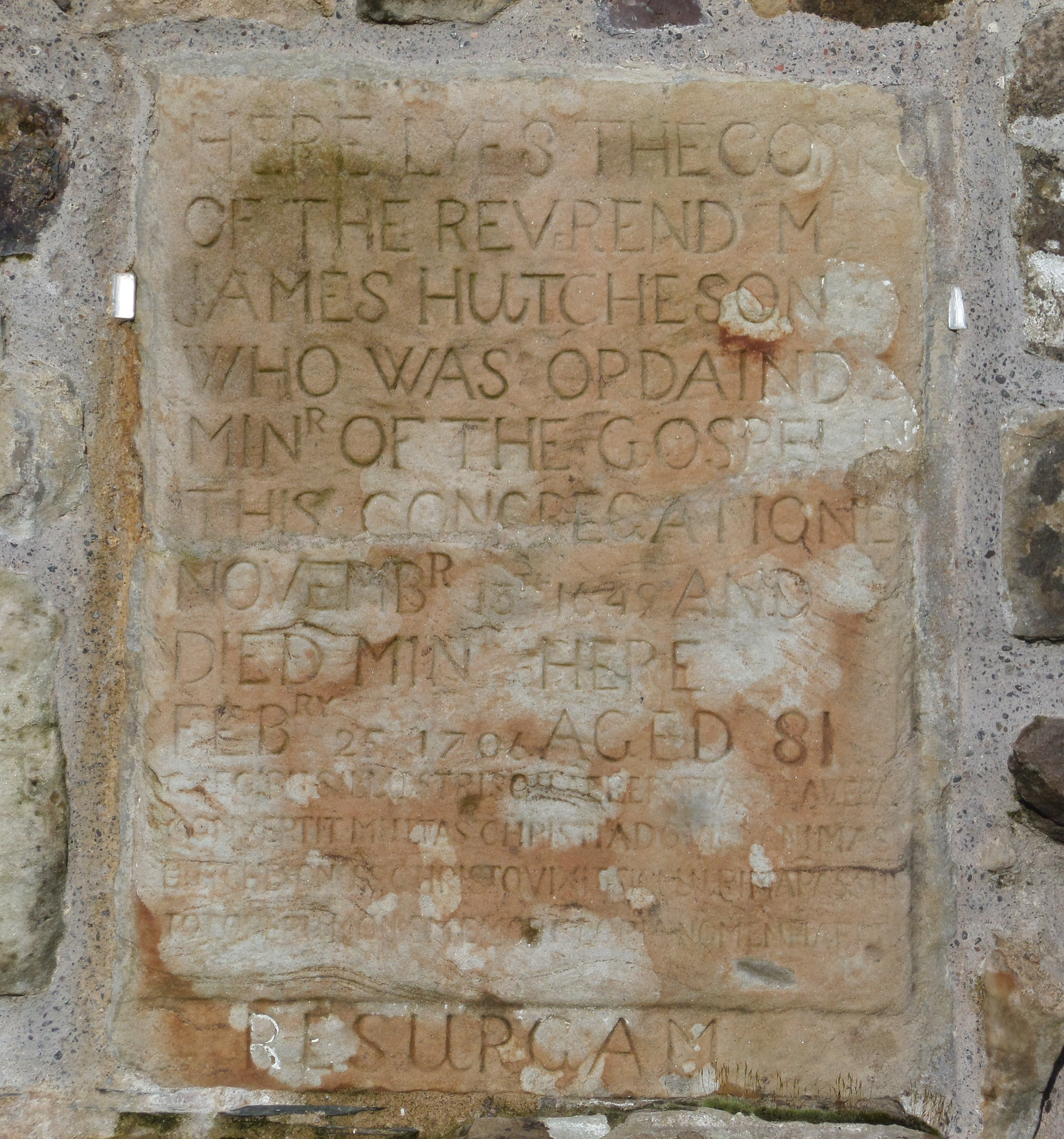
Plaque commemorating the Rev James Hutcheson.

A plaque on the outside of the south wall commemorates the Rev James Hutcheson, who served here from 1649 to his death aged 81 in 1706. He is notable also for his involvement in the Christian Shaw or Paisley witches' affair, which took place in 1697. Christian Shaw, aged 11, gave evidence that led to eight people being accused of witchcraft. It is reported that Shaw had been "betwitched" by the defendants and was exhibiting behaviours including flying, and was vomiting coal, hair, wool, bent pins, etc. Seven were hanged as a result of Christian's testimony, three men and four women, whilst the eighth accused person was found dead in his cell.

James Hutcheson was well known throughout Scotland for his ardent oppositions to witchcraft and a week before the trial he preached an hour long sermon in Paisley Abbey in which he vehemently condemned and called for action against all the aspects of pagan practices to an audience that contained all the judges, jurors and many of the witnesses at the forthcoming trials.

The Rev Peter Dale was minister of the joint parishes of Houston and Kilallan from his induction on 5 September 1843 until his death on 11 December 1856 as recorded on a marble plaque on an interior wall.

== St Fillan's Seat ==
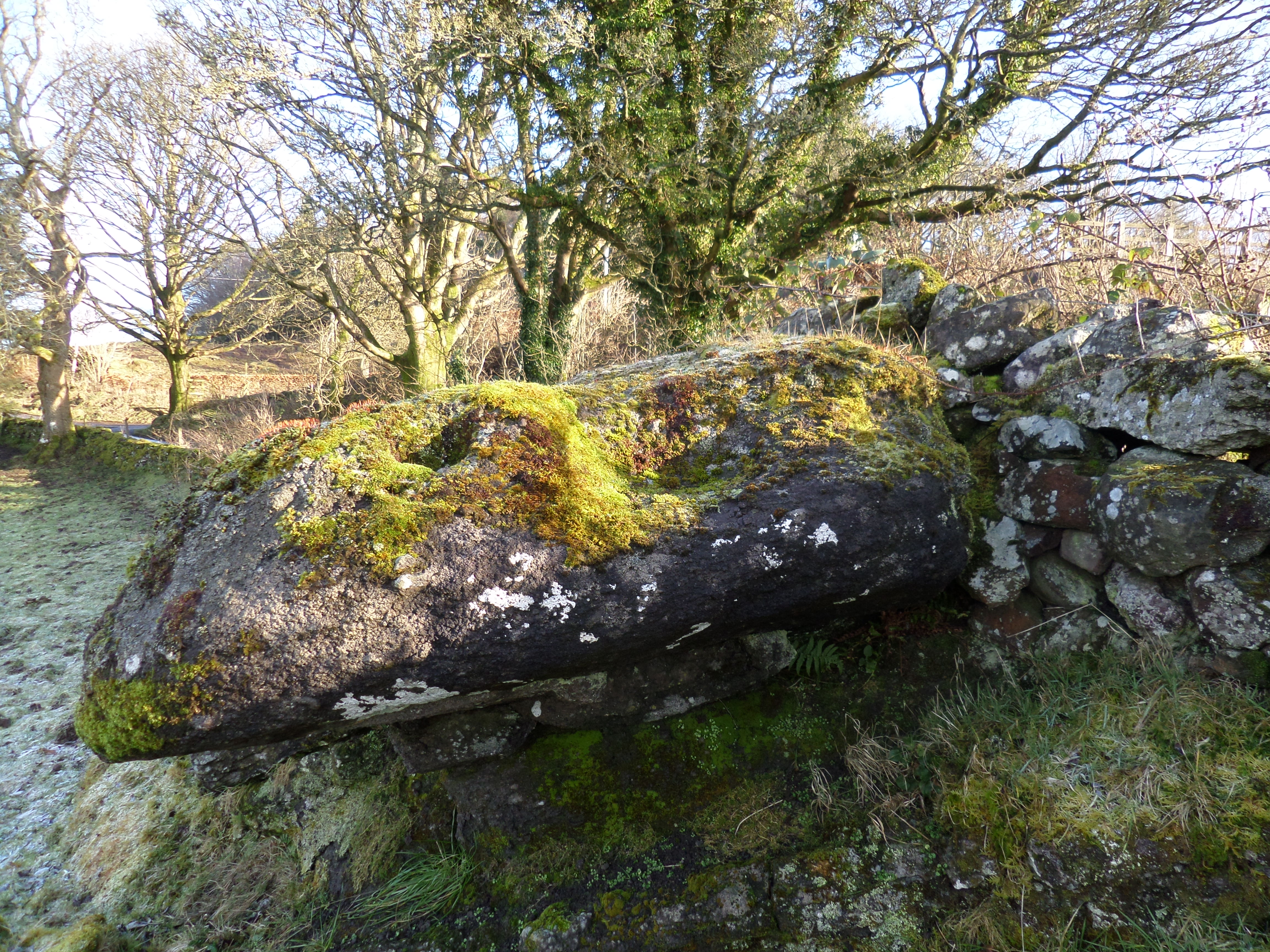
St Fillan's Seat

Also known as St Fillan's Chair or Pulpit (NS 38396892), this whinstone block is located against the drystone dike on the western side of the lane. It is a natural boulder that faces south and overlooks the Kirk and a field, in the corner of which stands St Fillan's Well. A circular hollow forms a south-facing seat and to the right-hand side is a smaller oval hollow. Local tradition records that St Fillan sat in this chair, preached and baptised converts and babies with holy water from the cup that had been collected from the nearby well. It is also said to cure rheumatism with the afflicted person first sitting on the seat and then being hauled down the hill by their feet to conclude the cure, although this may be a confusion with another Scottish St Fillan's Seat. Old engravings show that the soil level at the area of the seat has been significantly eroded through rainfall and the actions of cattle and horses.

== St Fillan's Well ==
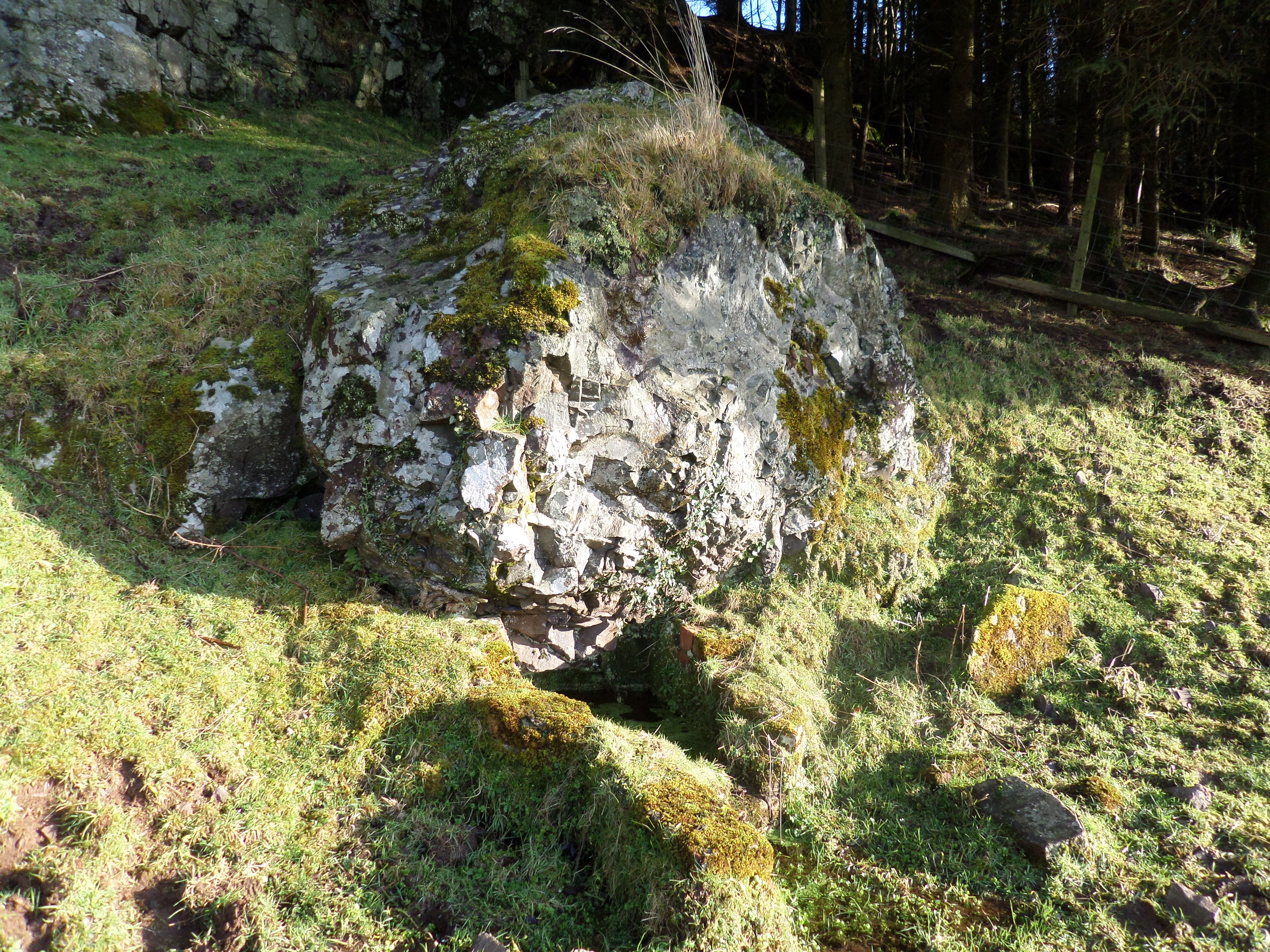
St Fillan's Holy Well.

St Fillan's holy well has probably been venerated since pre-Christian times and the spring water used by the saint himself. The water flows from beneath a large isolated rock that may have fallen from above and flows into a now ruinous round-shaped brick and stone basin. The holy water was thought to miraculously cure ailing children or those with rickets; pieces of cloth and rags being tied to overhanging branches at the well as votive offerings. The radical Calvinist minister, James Hutcheson, had the well filled with stones in around 1690. However, this was later cleared out as the water continued to flow and it was even piped to the old farm for domestic use. That may explain the current presence of brickwork at the site.

The waters of the clootie well were used for baptisms at St Fillan Kirk and traditionally at St Fillan's Seat. Branches used to hang over the well. However, no trees grow here at present. Old engravings indicate that the well had a circular wall with three courses of stone in the 19th century. A drawing of 1923 shows the three courses of stone or brick as a 'U' shape pierced by an overflow pipe that passed the holy waters into an old rectangular porcelain sink set into the ground. The drawing shows a shrub growing across the boulder behind the well. The water was said to be used to cure 'back-gane' bairns, that is, those who were not thriving.

== The Kneelins Stane ==
It is recorded that a form of Petrosomatoglyph called the 'Kneelins Stane' lay somewhere to the north of the old Kirk, some distance away, and it carried two larger and one smaller depression that had been created by pilgrims who knelt here to pray to the saint and over the years their knees and staffs wore these depressions into this large flat rock set into the moorland.

== The Barochan Cross ==
After being moved by the Laird of Barochan, the monument is now kept in Paisley Abbey. It is an ornately carved Celtic cross dating from the 8th or 9th century. The cross stood quite close to Kilallan (NS40586937), near to Barochan Castle on the site of a trackway that once led to Dumbarton Castle, the seat of the old Kingdom of Strathclyde. The carving is of the Govan school of carving.

== Cartographic evidence and place names ==
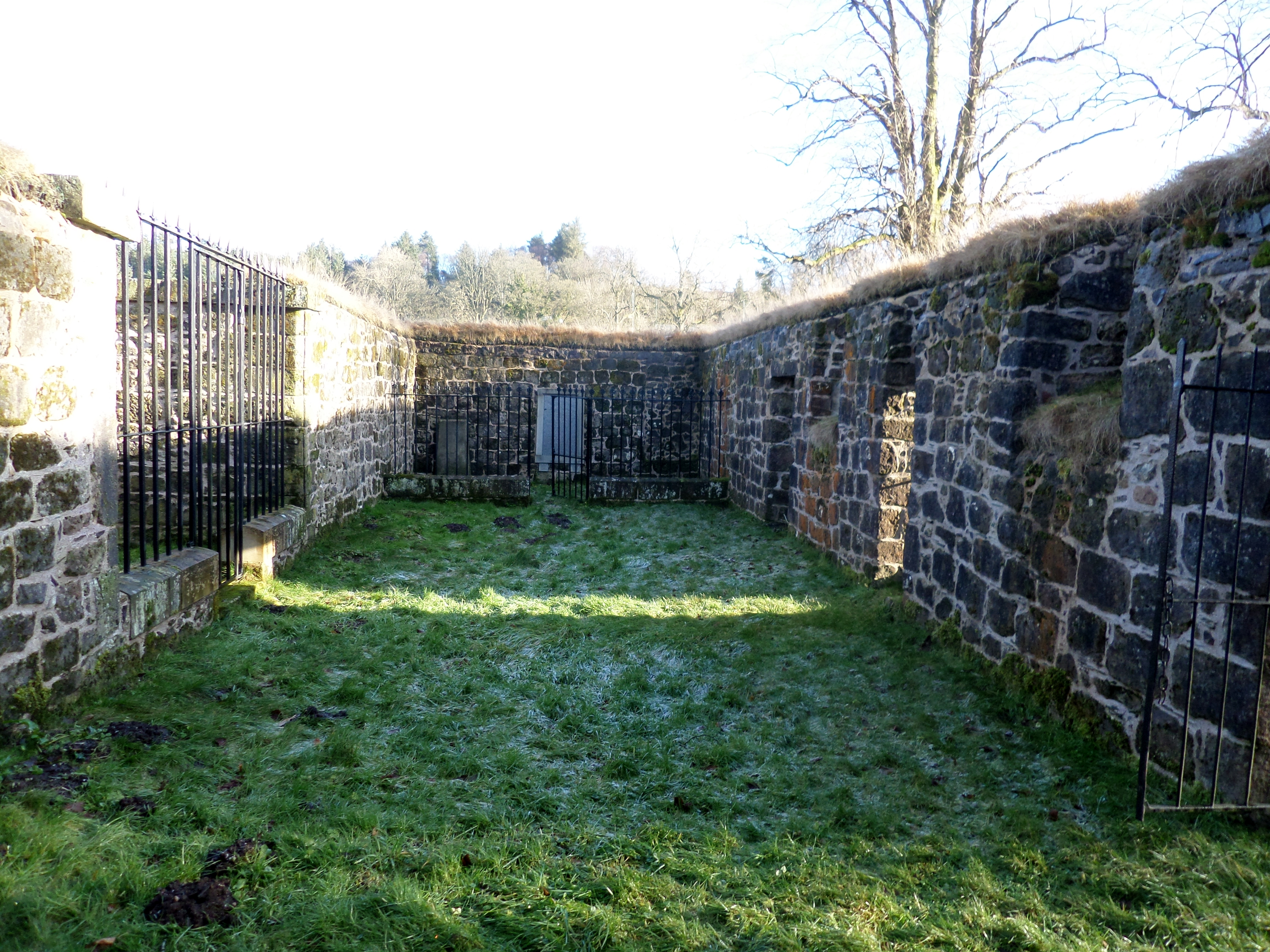
The Barochan Aisle and the church interior.

As stated a number of other 'St Fillan' place names exist in Scotland including wells, caves, churches, a village and other natural features. The identity and history of St Fillan has been lost in the mists of time and the name may refer to several different personages at different periods in history.

Various spellings are used for the old parish and kirk on old maps and other documents, such as Kilfillan, Kylhelan, Killilellin, Kyllinan, Kilenan, Kilellan and Killallan. Additionally, Killellen is clearly marked with two buildings, probably representing the church and the manse or vicarage on Timothy Pont's map of circa 1560 to 1614. North, West, Mid and East Barfillan farms are recorded in 1800. A Crosslee Hill is located nearby, suggesting a causal link and, as stated, the Barochan Cross once stood in the vicinity.

== See also ==
- Kirkbride, Durisdeer
- St Peter's Well, Houston
- St Margaret's Well, Edinburgh

== Bibliography ==
- Brotchie, T.C.F. (1923). The Borderlands of Glasgow. Glasgow : The Tramway Department, Corporation of Glasgow.
- Cope, P. (2015). Holy Wells Scotland. Bridgend : Seren. ISBN 978-1-78172-258-9
- Houstoniana - An Historical, Antiquarian, Topographical and General Record of the United Parishes of Houston and Kilallan. (1884). Paisley : J. C. Campbell.
- Snoddy, T. G. (1950). Round About Greenock. Kirkcaldy : The Allen Lithographic Co. Ltd.
- Walker, J R. (1883). Holy Wells in Scotland, Proc Soc Antiq Scot, vol. 17, 1882–3.
