= St Peter's Well, Houston =

Coordinates: 55.874287°N 4.5467449°W

St Peter's Well: Scots: Kilpeter Well
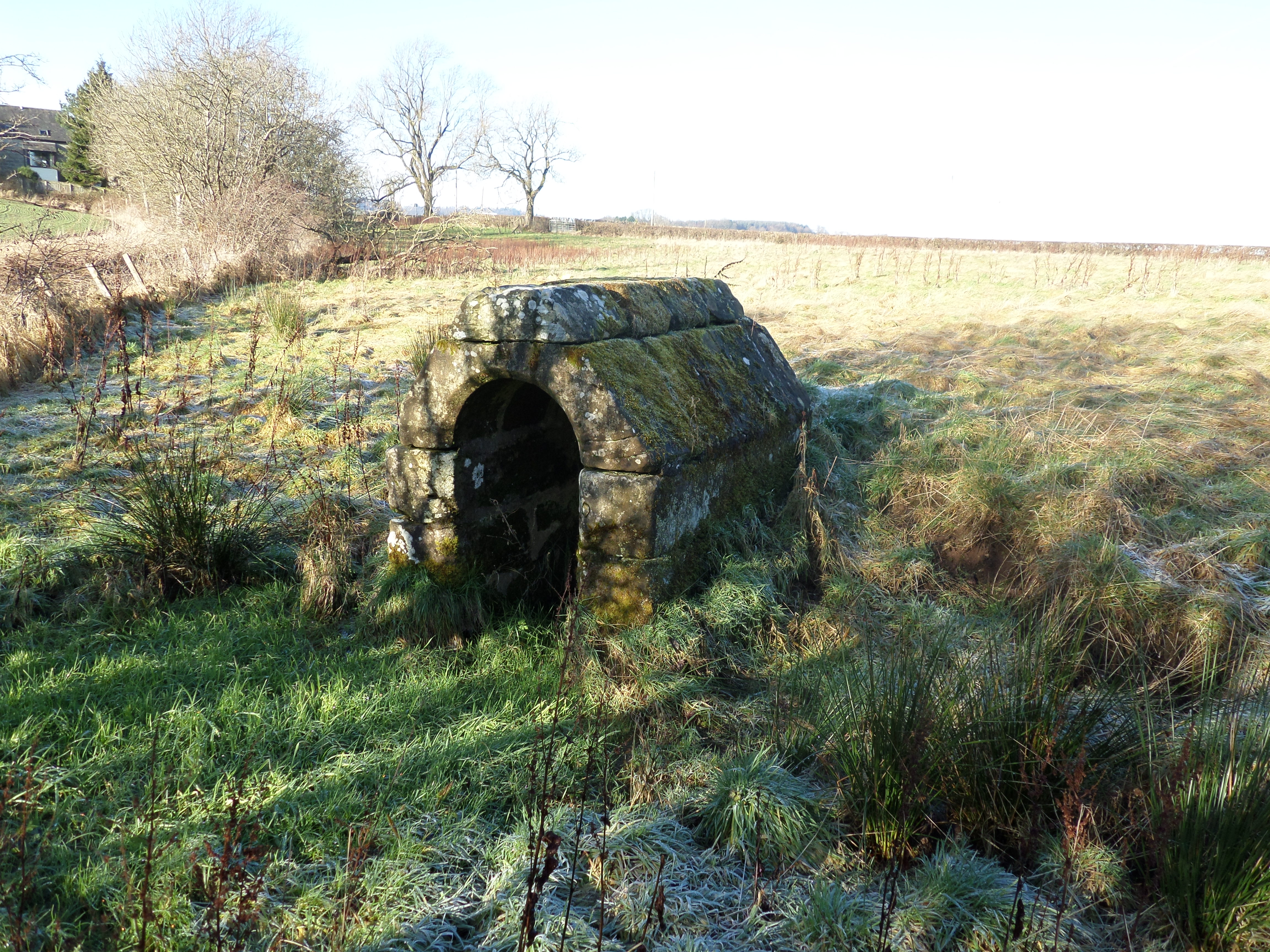
- St Peter's Well

- Location within Renfrewshire
- OS grid reference: NS4076367502
- Council area: Renfrewshire
- Country: Scotland
- Sovereign state: United Kingdom
- Post town: Johnstone
- Police: Scotland
- Fire: Scottish
- Ambulance: Scottish

St Peter's Well is a rare surviving example of a holy well house or covered well that was built over the waters of a spring in a field below Greenhill Farm, located off Chapel Road near Houston in Renfrewshire, parish of Houston and Kilellan, south-west Scotland.

== History ==
The town of Houston was originally known as Kilpeter i.e. 'Cella Petris'. A chapel was located near by and a local farm was called 'Chapelton'. The holy waters of the well were thought to ensure protection against misadventure, ensuring the safe return of travellers. The age of the present building is uncertain however it was regarded as ancient in Victorian times and it may owe its existence to the availability of suitable worked stone following the abandonment of the old chapel at around the time of the Scottish Reformation in the 16th century.

=== The Well House ===
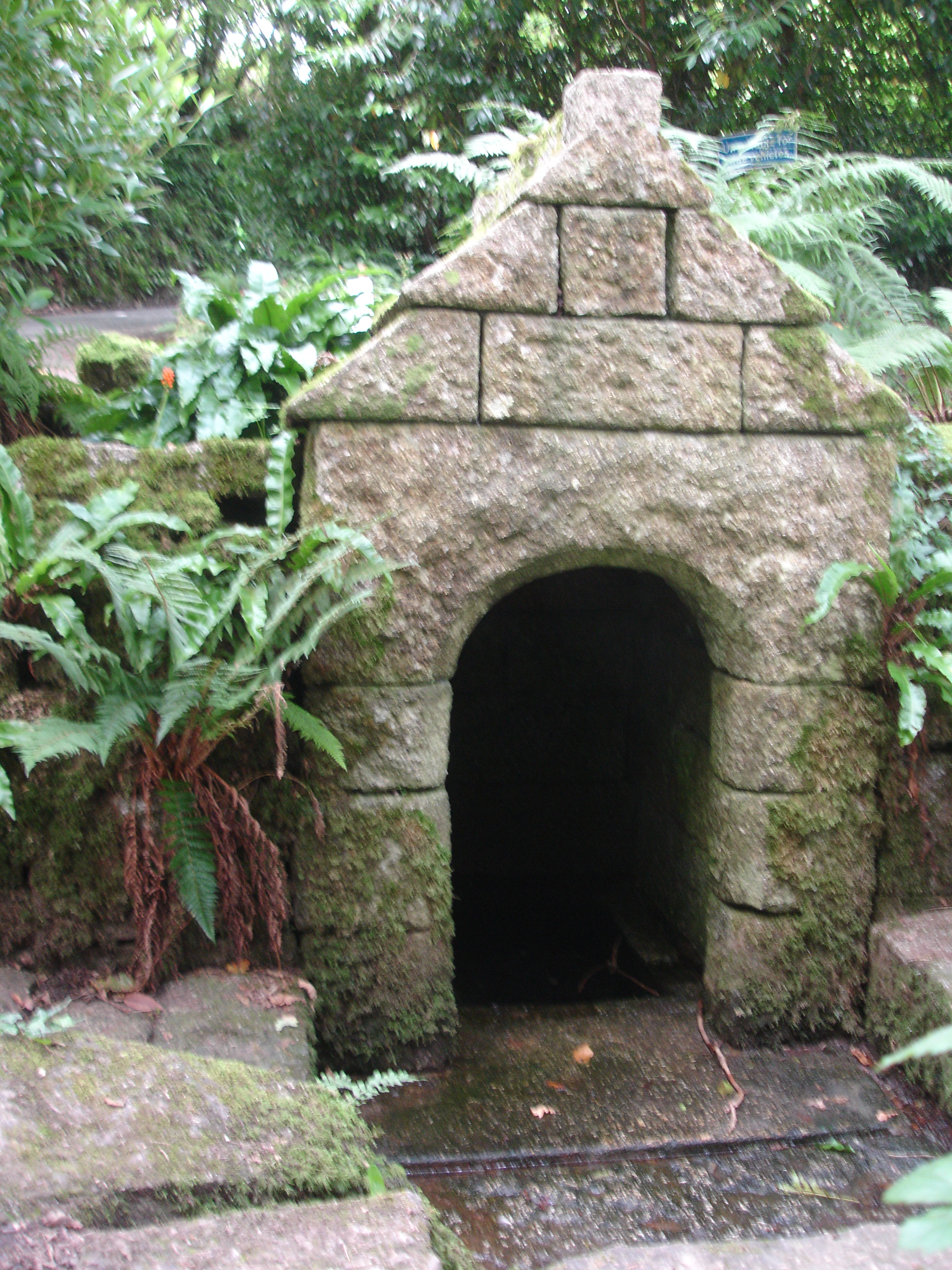
St Keyne's Well House in Cornwall is very similar in appearance to St Peter's Well except for the apex ridge of the roof

St Peter's Well is a Category B Listed Building, rectangular with a flat ridge or 'saddle-shaped' top and a steeply pitched roof with little ornamentation other than a chamfer on the arch at the entrance. A stone appears to be missing at the closed northern 'gable' end of the well house and no clear indications remain as to whether any form of religious ornamentation existed, such as crosses, ever formed a part of the building. Several cup-shaped depressions exist on the ridge, and it seems logical that originally another course existed, most likely a single stone extending the length of the building that would seal the building by covering the cross joints of the second course and making it water tight.

St Peter's is a small freestone building, circa 4.5 ft wide and 5.5 ft long. The indications of a hole in each top stone of the sides at the entrance indicate that typical chained cups were once attached for those taking the water or a gate over the entrance once existed to keep animals from drinking from within. In the 1880s, the well was not being maintained and showed a 'dry stone' method of construction, there being no signs of mortar in the joints and that also hints at the re-use of worked stone from another abandoned building nearby, such as the chapel.

In the Scottish Reformation, Presbyterian attitudes would have resulted in the removal of overt symbolism and if a 'missing' third course of stone on the roof carried one or two crosses, then this might account for any removal. In the 1880s, it was recorded as being in danger of collapse. However, the present structure has been internally consolidated and now has cement between the stones, and it appears to be in good overall condition (datum 2018). Curiously, the arch stone is clearly shown without a chamfered edge in the detailed 'architects' drawings of 1883. However, it does have one at present suggesting that it was turned around during restoration. One of the holes in

The well house is built onto a low bank and the spring's waters now flow through the grass into the nearby St Peter's Burn that then continues into the grounds of Houston House. The well is choked with vegetation and the ground in front of the well is so boggy that access is not possible without suitable footwear, a situation that suggests that a direct channel to St Peter's Burn once existed.

== St Peter's Fair ==
St. Peter's Day was June 29 and a very popular fair was once held here which may link to the last echoes of pagan midsummer celebrations. Farmers sold their produce, horse racing took place at Greenhills and at the well, etc.

=== St Peter's Well in local literature ===
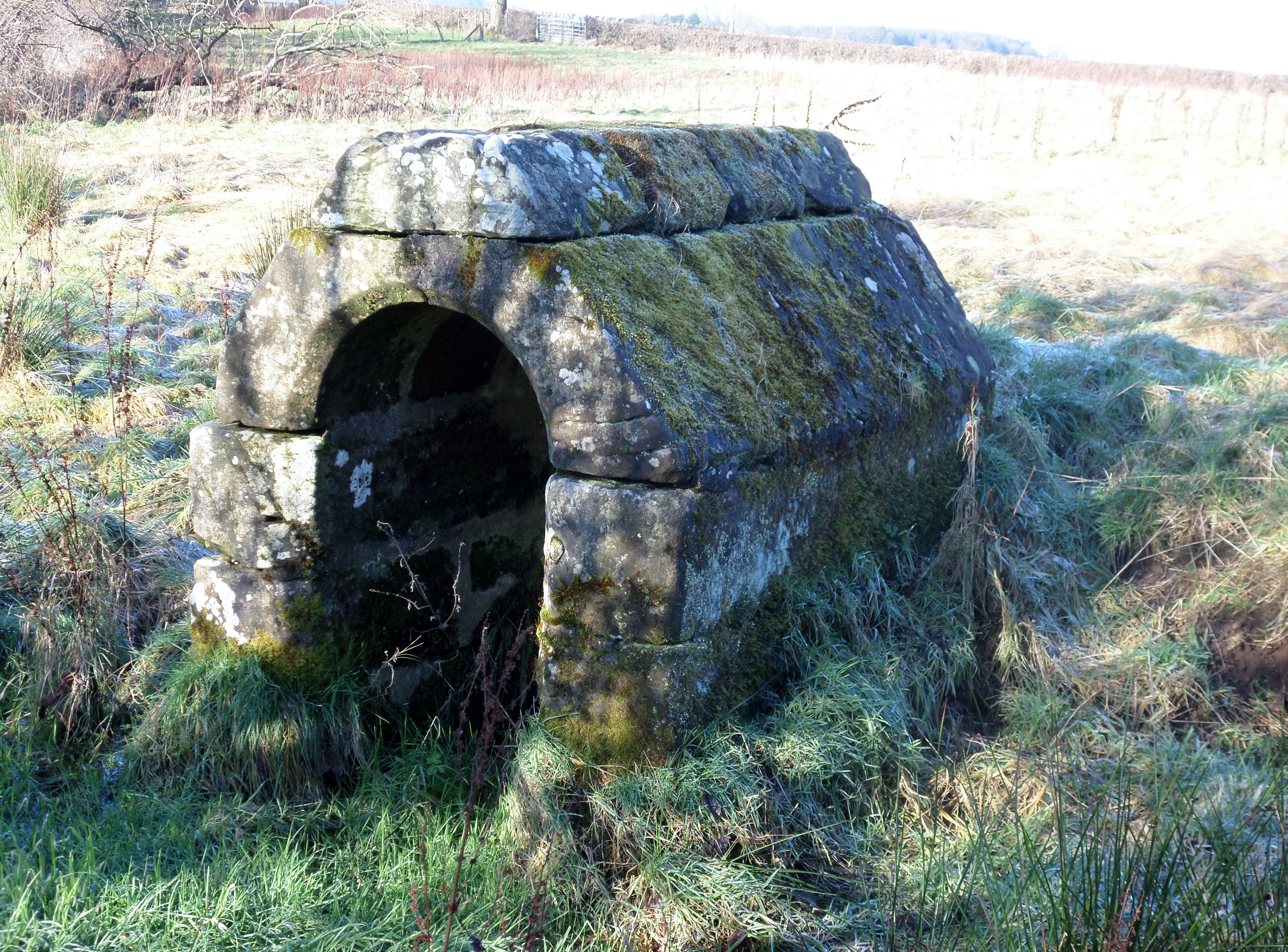
Detail of the well and spring.

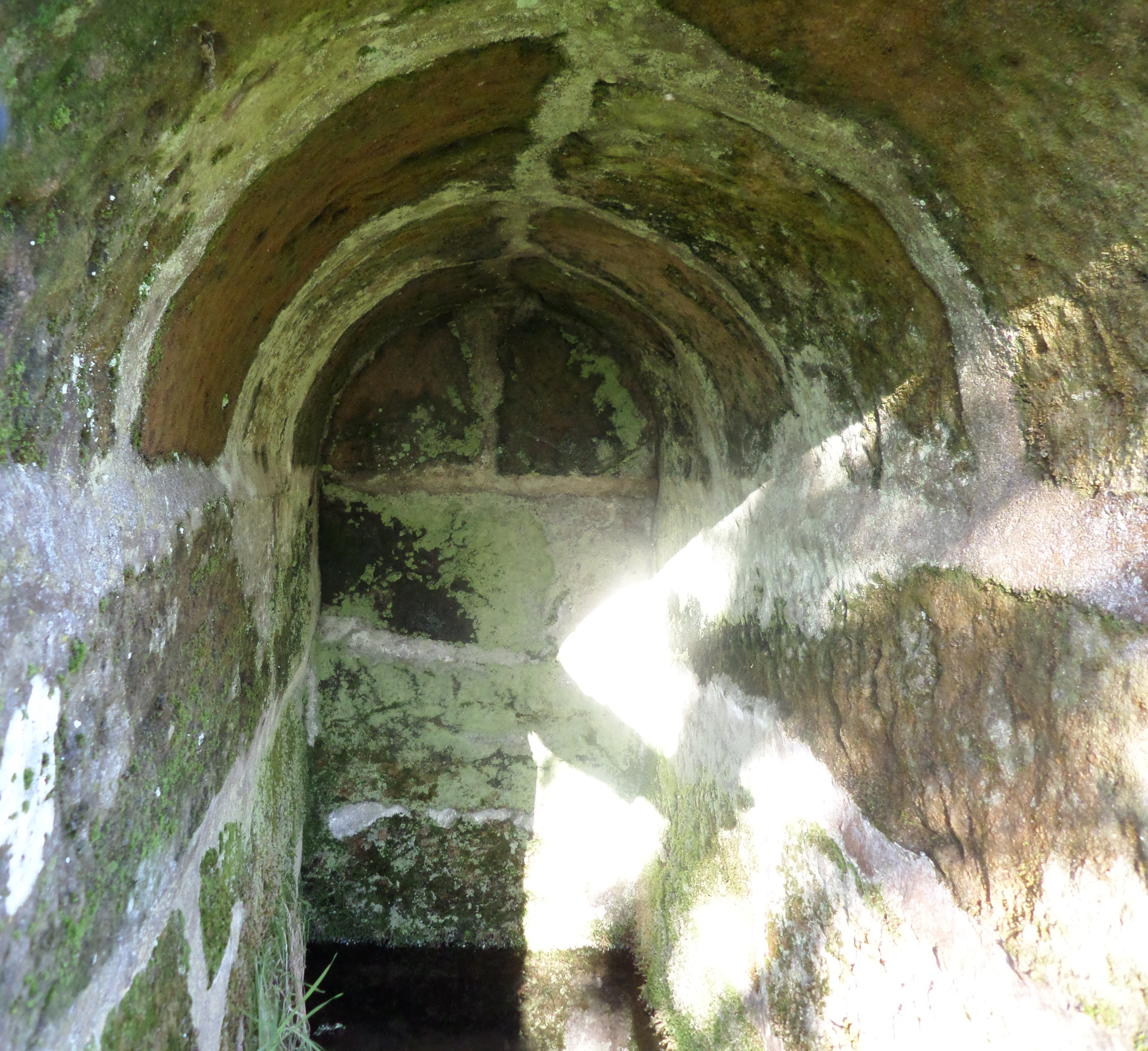
The interior of the well.

A local poem has it that whosoever should drink of the holy water would ensure a safe return to Houston:

Peter's Well is a holy well,
Sainted in days of old;
He hath finished his vigils spell,
And sleeps in the church-yard mould.

He hath blessed its waters with virtues rare
By mass, by book and by rood,
And the Legend tells he that drinketh there,
Hath a blessing of matchless good.

For how weary soe'er his wanderings may be
Through lands that are distant and wild,
The blessings shall bear him o'er mountain and sea
To the home that he trode when a child.

Though grey be his beard and wrinkled his brow,
And weak be the steps of his age,
The Spell of his age, it matters not how,
Can his bitterest griefs assuage.

And bringing him back, whether rich or poor
Whether vagabond, wise or gay
Ensureth a draught of water that's pure,
And a grave in the village clay.

The drink of the well with the sainted spell,
Though its magic power be fled,
The crozier broken, the saint forgotten,
The Legend past and died.

Supplied by Mr. A. B. Barr, Houston

== Micro-history ==
A religious service is held here annually by the minister and congregation of the parish church of Houston and Kilellen.

== See also ==
- Maak's or Monk's Well, Kilmaurs, East Ayrshire
- Monk's Well, Chapeltoun, East Ayrshire
- St Fillan's Well, Kilallan, Renfrewshire
- St Margaret's Well, Edinburgh

== Bibliography ==
- Brotchie, T. C. F. (1923). The Borderlands of Glasgow. The Tramway Department. Corporation of Glasgow.
- Houstoniana - An Historical, Antiquarian, Topographical and General Record of the United Parishes of Houston and Kilallan. (1884). Paisley : J. C. Campbell.
- Walker, J R. (1883). Holy Wells in Scotland, Proc Soc Antiq Scot, vol. 17, 1882–3.
