= St Margaret's Well, Edinburgh =

Well in Edinburgh, Scotland

Coordinates: 55°57′3″N 3°10′6″W

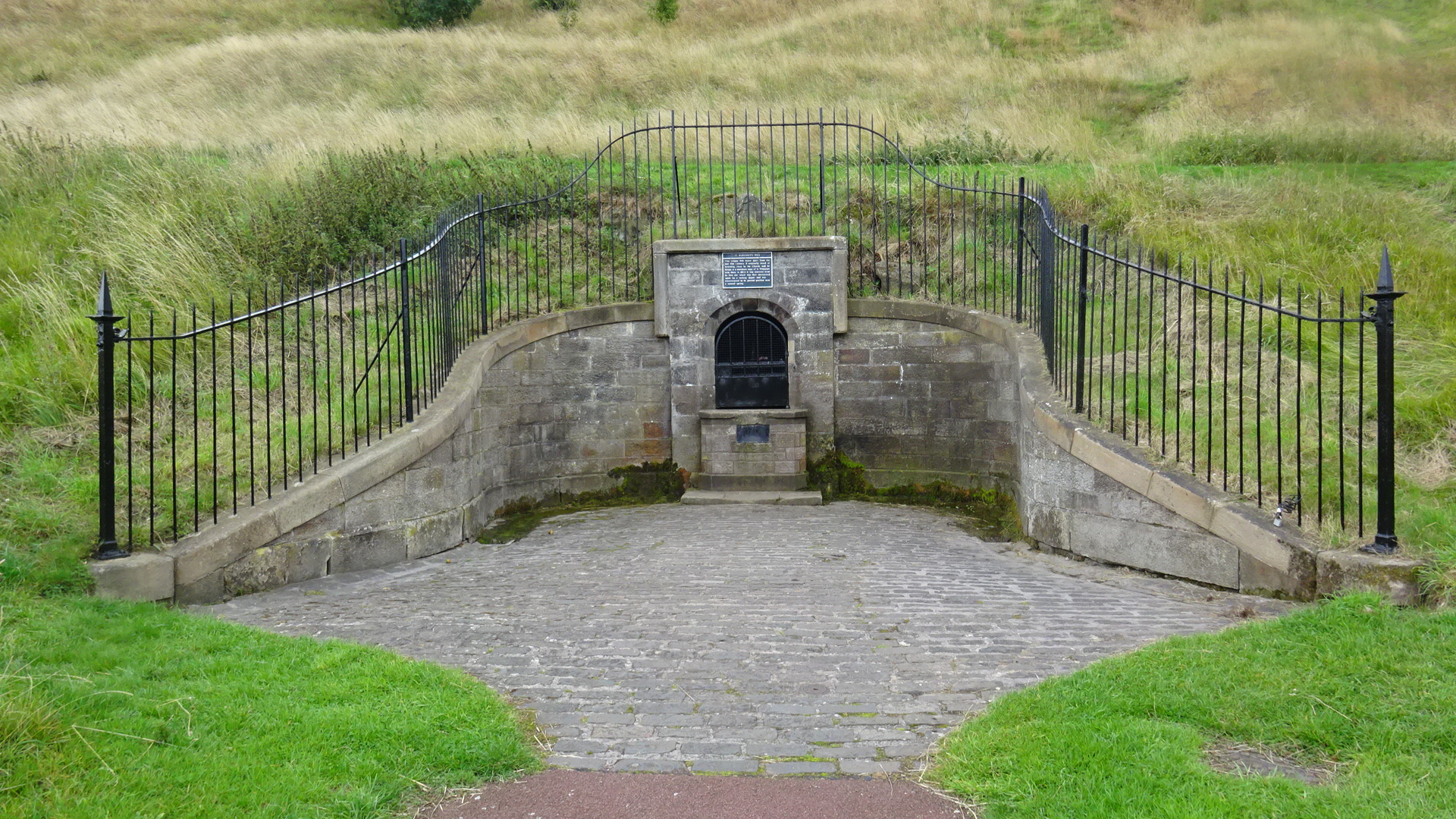
St Margaret's Well.

St Margaret's Well (NT271737) is a Category B listed holy well that was relocated to Holyrood Park off Queen's Drive in Edinburgh from Restalrig in 1860. It is one of seven wells located in the park.

== History ==
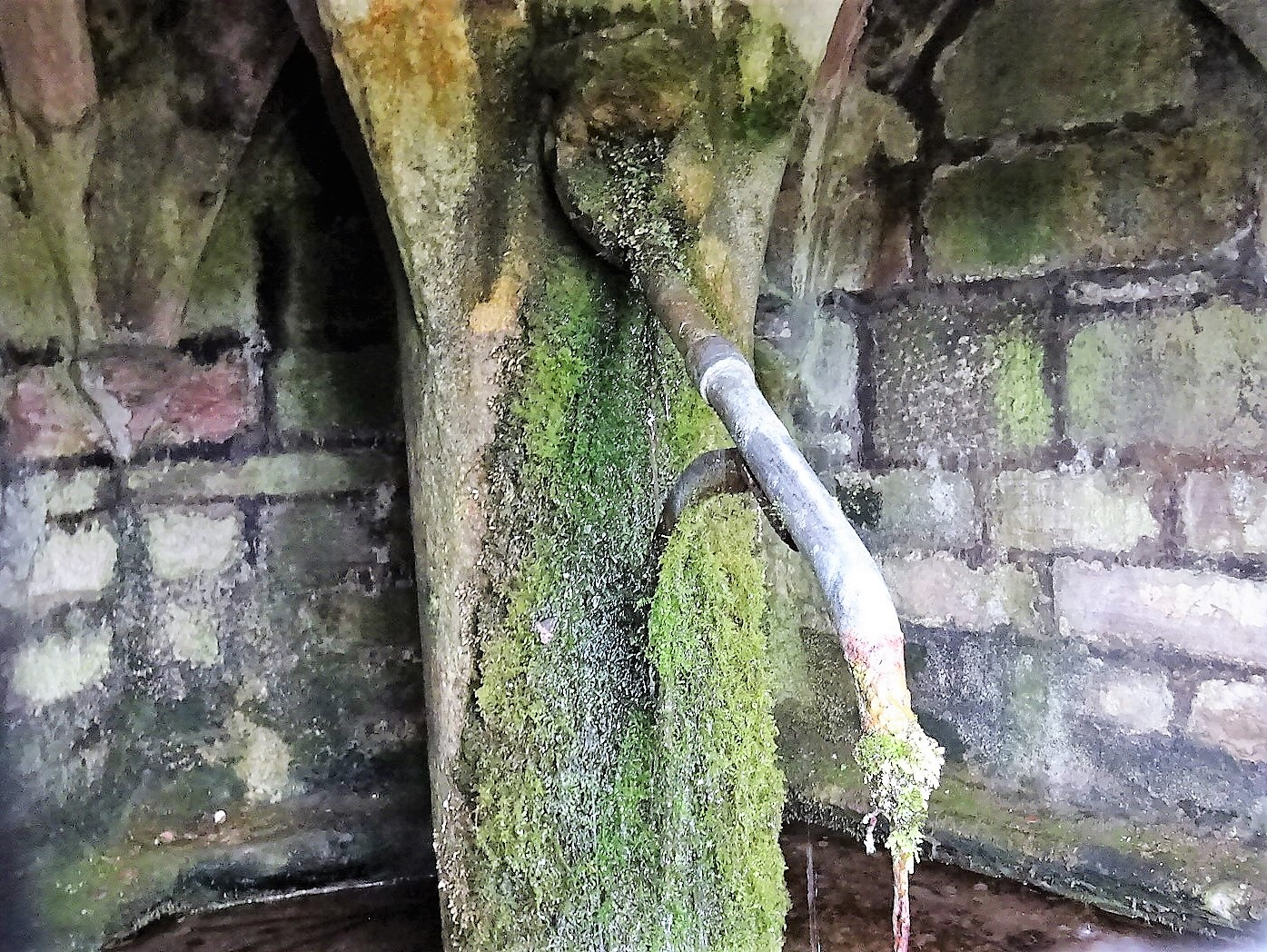
The groteque mask and lead pipe

Location of the St Margaret's Well, Edinburgh

St Margaret's Holy Well was once a place of pilgrimage due to its medicinal waters originally located in the Restalrig area of Edinburgh next to the present-day East Coast Mainline. The well's site was due to be partly built over by the North British Railway's St Margaret's railway works in 1859/60 and, due to its historical significance, it was carefully dismantled and moved stone by stone to its present location by the Society of Antiquaries of Scotland.

In the Meadowbank Stadium area stands a large triangular shaped memorial stone with a metal plaque recording that: "This stone marks the site of St. Margaret’s Well. The dressed stone work of the fifteenth century wellhouse built over this ancient medicinal well and centre of pilgrimage was removed in 1859 and used to build a replica of it over St. David’s Well in the Queen’s Park and the remains of the medieval building were filled in in 1969."

== Architecture ==
Dating from the 15th century, the well house is of a Gothic style, hexagonal in overall shape with rib-vaulting, the whole built into the hillside with semicircular stone exterior walling and a circular drinking bowl of a harder stone set externally. The interior has a central pillar with carved bosses with a pool below and a design based upon the design of St Triduana's Aisle at Restalrig. The water flows from a carved grotesque mask that had at some point been fitted with a pipe that once brought the water to the entrance area and allowed the easy filling of jugs, etc.

A round-arched opening into the well house has metal grating leading to well-house. Metal railings run along the top of the exterior walls. When first moved to Holyrood, it did not have the semi-circular walling and was fully open to allow access to the water.

== David's or the Well of the Holy Rood ==
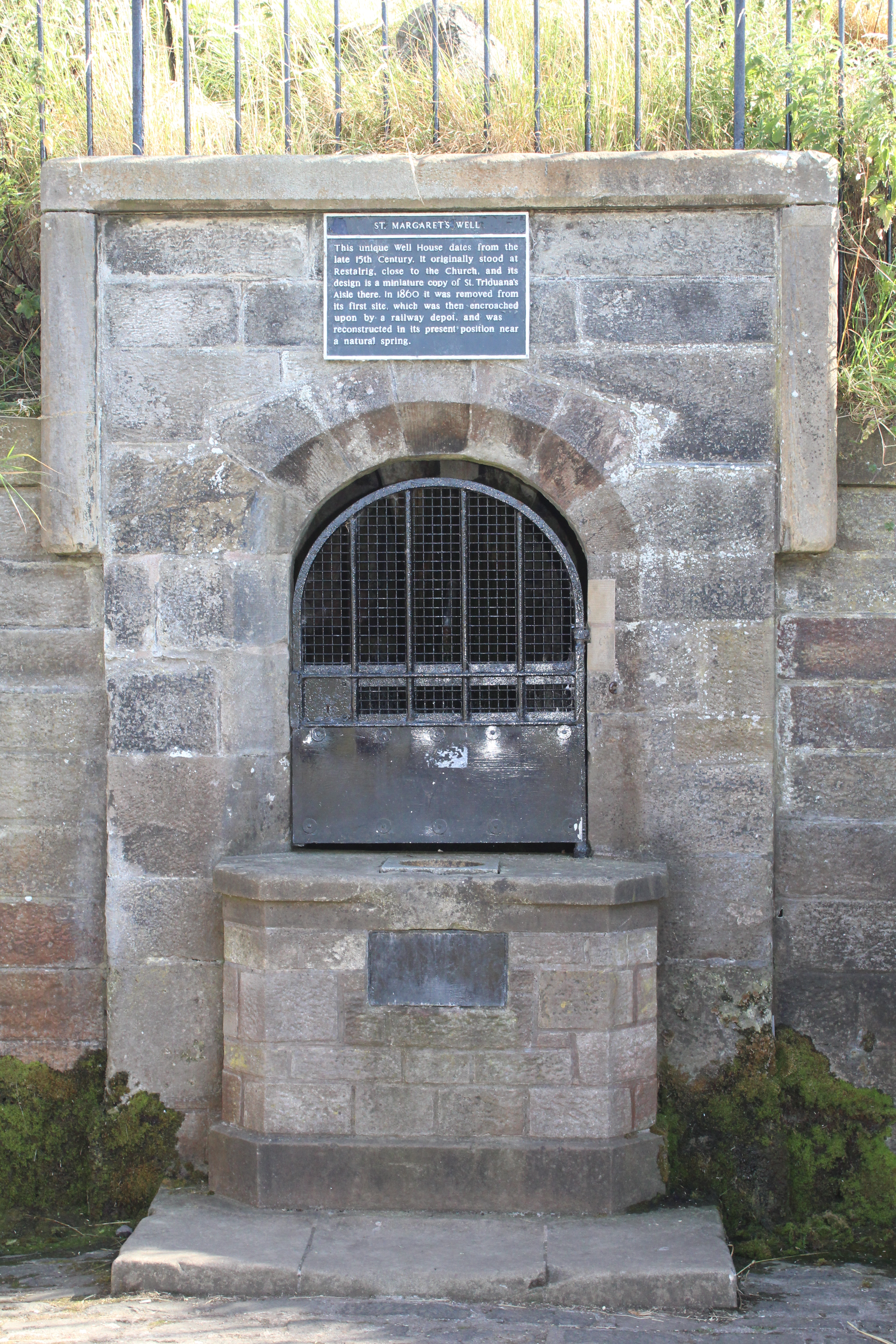
Detail of the well entrance

The spring that still supplies St Margaret's Well is regarded as holy, as it is thought to rise from the Well of the Holy Rood, Holy Cross or David’s Well, named after King David I who was not actually an official saint although the name St David's Well is sometimes used. The legend, that has various versions, states that King David I went hunting with his court after taking mass on 14 September 1128 in the forests lying to the east of Edinburgh during the Feast of the Cross. Upon halting on the north slope of Salisbury Crag, the king was attacked by a large hart or stag which had been resting next to a spring. Thrown from his horse he was gored. However, he prayed for deliverance and, upon grabbing the stag or hart's antlers in self-defence suddenly a cross appeared on its antlers and the animal then moved off towards the spring from whence it had come and vanished.

The old spring became known as the Spring of the Cross, the Well of the Holy Rood or David's Well (NT 2714 7370) and was the site of this incident. King David established a church near by as an act of gratitude for his survival that became Holyrood Abbey.

The water which flows through is said to come from the natural spring that supplied the old David's or the Well of the Holy Rood that once lay in a hollow above.

The Scots word Rood refers specifically to the cross of Christ.

The curative well of St Vining (NT 2651 7368) stood in the area and is said to have sprung up at Holyrood on the intercession of this saint and remained in use by believers until the 16th century reformation.

=== The site today ===
The well site has been restored several times and is used as a wishing well with many coins thrown by visitors into the holy water pool. Access to the water itself is no longer possible due to the presence of a metal grill. The site lies below the Salisbury Crags of Arthur's Seat with a pedestrian and cycle path running above. A path nearby runs up to the Hunter's Bog and St Margaret's Loch and the ruins of St Anthony's Chapel and Well lie to the east. An area of cobbles lies in front of the well.

A plaque above the well informs: "This unique Well House dates from the late 15th Century. It originally stood at Restalrig, close to the Church, and its design is a miniature copy of St. Triduana's Aisle there. In 1860 it was removed from its first site, which was then encroached upon by a railway depot, and was reconstructed in its present position near a natural spring."

== See also ==
- St Fillan's Kirk, Seat and Well
- St Peter's Well, Houston
- Wallace's Well – Robroyston, Glasgow
