= Clyde Waterfront Regeneration =

Regeneration project in Glasgow, Scotland

Coordinates: 55°54′19.2″N 4°24′29.8″W

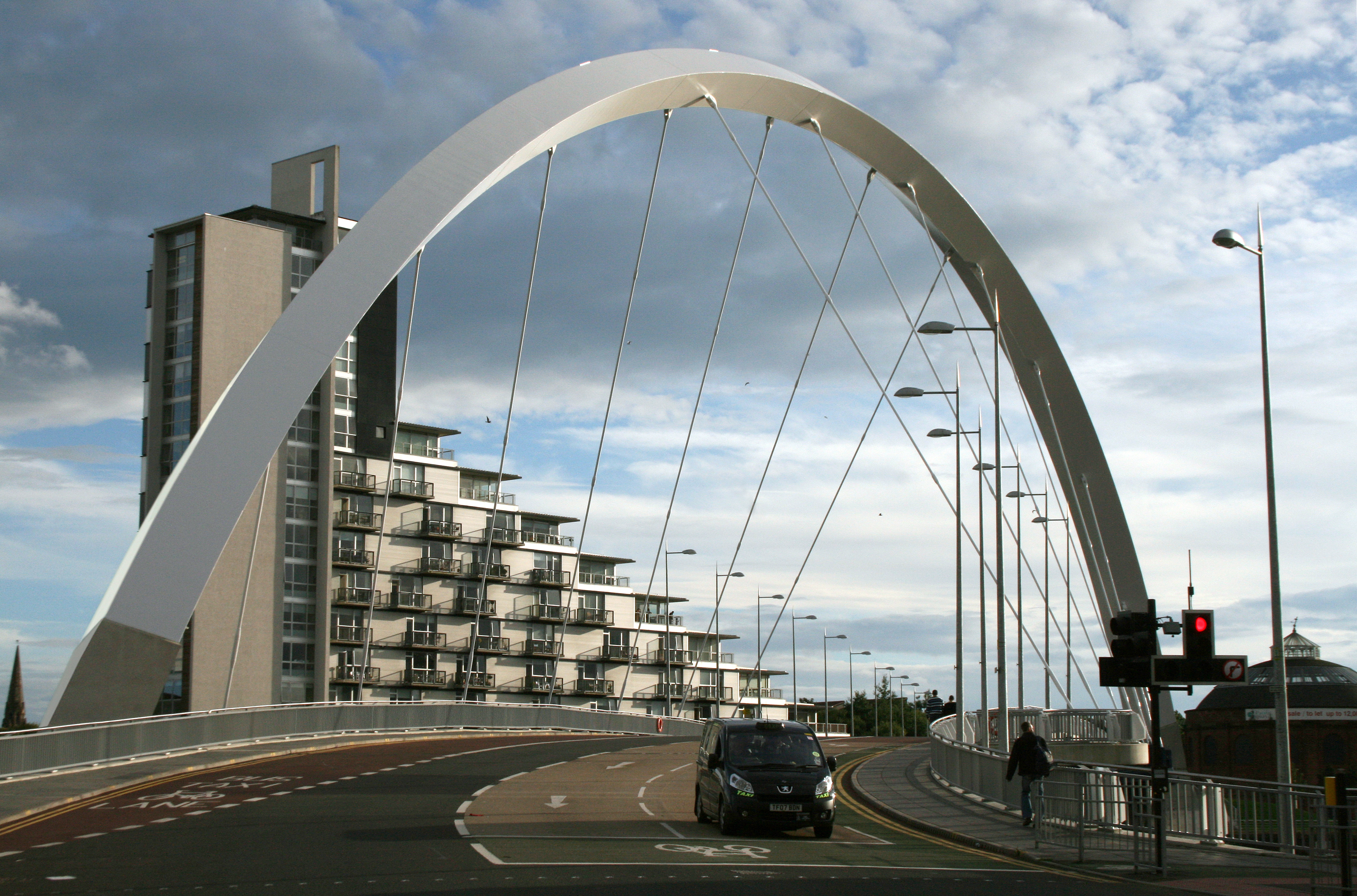
Clyde Arc

The 20 km long Clyde Waterfront Regeneration, launched in 2003, embraced a section of the River Clyde in Scotland that runs from Glasgow Green in the city's center to Dumbarton down river. This scene focused on earlier initiatives under way from the 1980s, and as a separate marketing tool, with several local authorities involved, came to an end in 2014.

Projects under way at the time involved local commerce, housing, tourism, and infrastructure. The planned public and private investment in Clyde Waterfront as of 2008 was pegged at £5–6 billion.

The Clyde Waterfront Regeneration project was an initiative aimed at progressing the transforming of the waterfront area of Glasgow, Scotland.

Some of the key aspects of the Clyde Waterfront Regeneration project were:

- New commercial and residential properties: the project involved the construction of new buildings, including office spaces, residential properties, and hotels. Notable developments included the Riverside Museum, the Hydro arena, and the Glasgow Science Centre Tower.
- Public spaces: the project aimed to create more public spaces along the waterfront, including parks, walkways, and cycle paths. The Glasgow Harbour development sought a riverside promenade.
- Infrastructure improvements: The project also involved significant infrastructure improvements, including the upgrading of roads, bridges, and public transport links. The Clyde Arc, also known as the Squinty Bridge, was built as part of the project, and provides a new pedestrian and cycle route across the river.

The Clyde Waterfront Regeneration project is a collaboration between Glasgow City Council, Scottish Enterprise, and other partners. It was seen as a key driver of economic growth in the area, and attracted significant investment from both public and private sectors.

As well as supporting inward investment and tourism, the aim of the regeneration of the Clyde was to benefit local communities. It was intended that local people would benefit from the improvements to transport and leisure facilities, shops and businesses, and from new jobs coming into the area. An estimated 50,000 new jobs will be created as businesses relocate in the area and more housing is built. Re-training is vital and a range of support is available locally to make sure residents can exploit the new opportunities as they arise.

== Projects ==
=== Commercial and residential ===
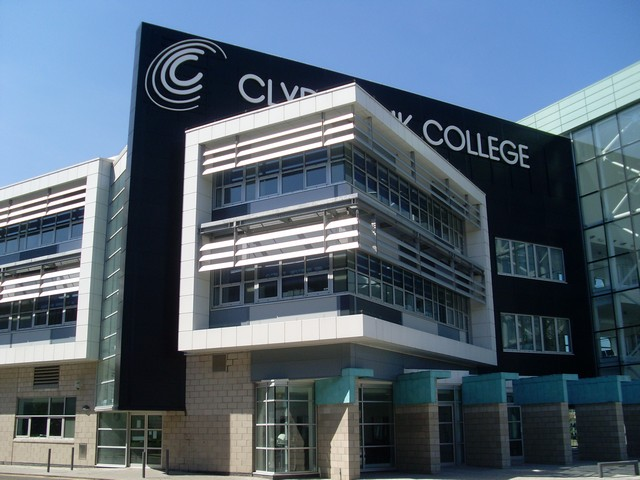
Clydebank College

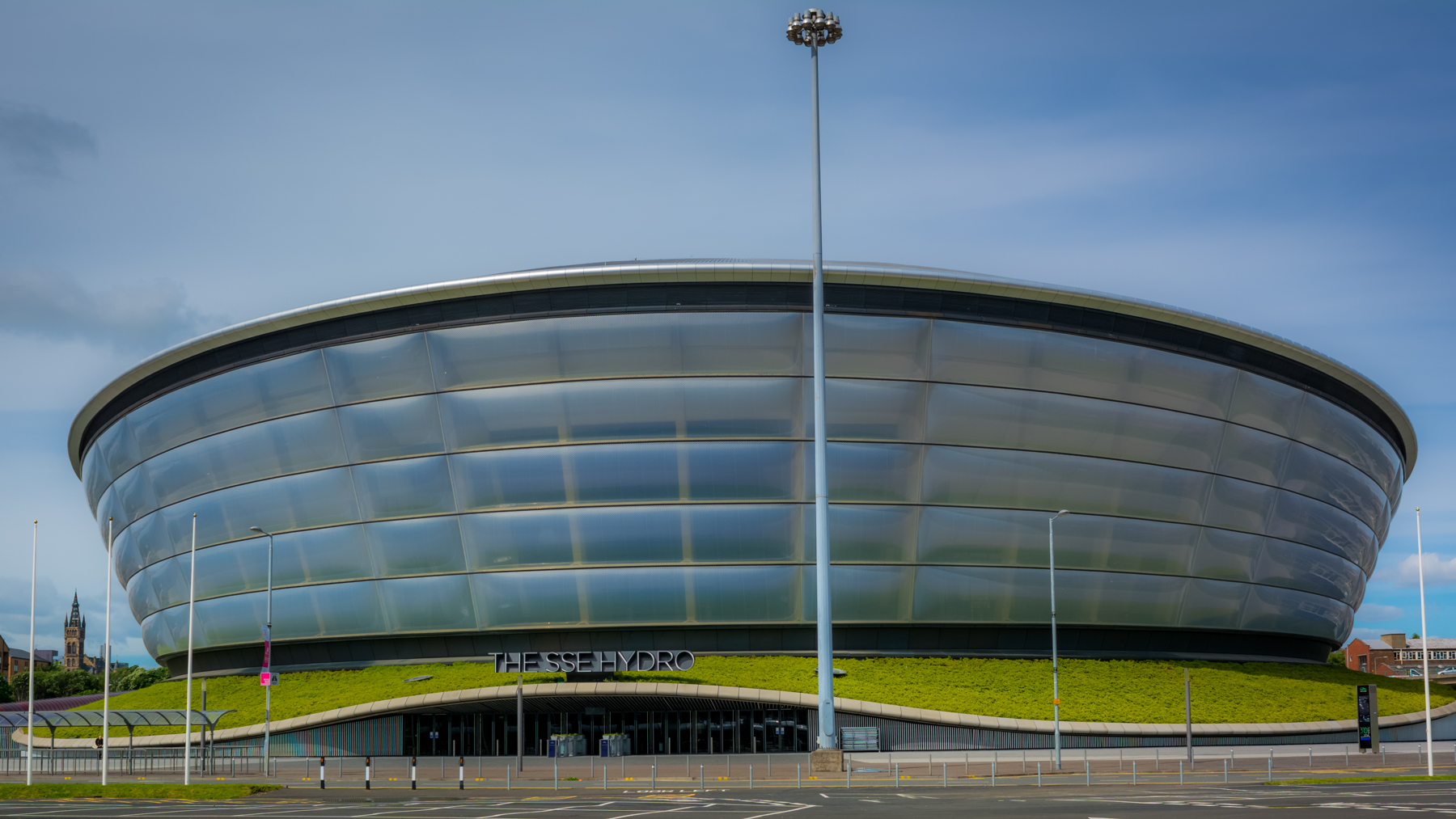
OVO Hydro

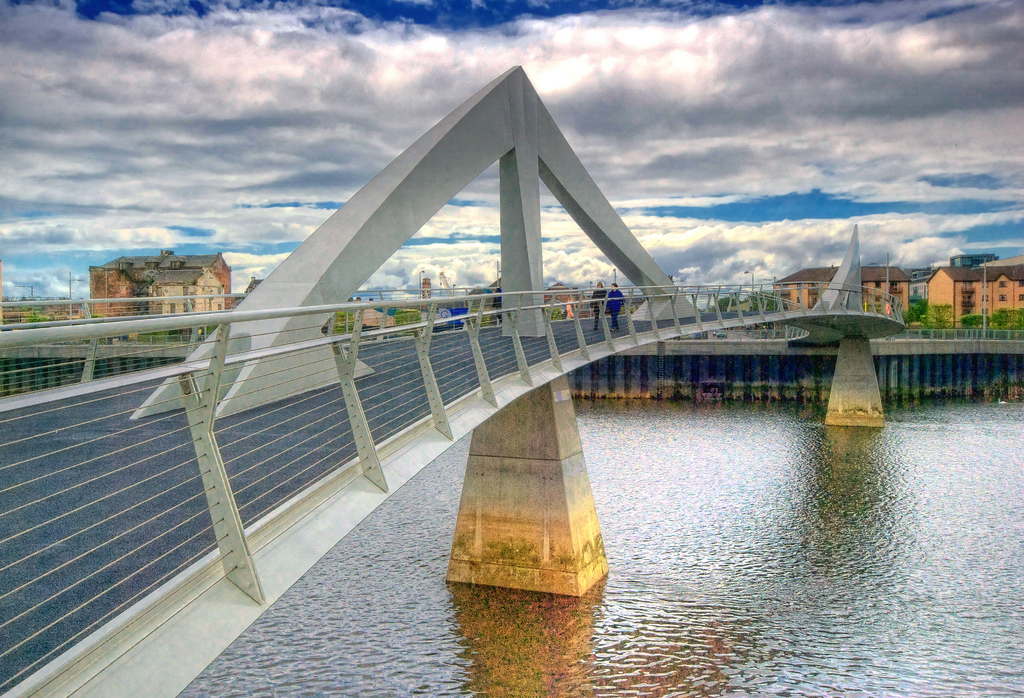
Tradeston Bridge

In Glasgow city centre, the International Financial Services District (IFSD) formed in previous years attracts new financial companies to the city. The IFSD, a joint partnership led by Scottish Enterprise and Glasgow City Council, has created almost two million square feet of new Grade ‘A’ office accommodation in the centre of the city. Since the launch of the project in 2001, over 15,000 new jobs have moved into the area, and over £1 billion has been invested.

Business parks are growing, the town of Renfrew is being regenerated, and a number of leading house builders are creating 2,000 new homes at Ferry Village, close to the Xscape leisure development.

Glasgow's Digital media Quarter at Pacific Quay had become home to the headquarters of BBC Scotland, with three major studio spaces, including "Studio A", the largest television studio outside London. The nearby Medius and Hub buildings, provide further opportunities for Scotland's digital media industries.

Back on the north side of the river, the first phase of the £1.2 billion residential development at Glasgow Harbour is almost entirely sold out. The second phase of housing, GH20, will provide a further 800 apartments, with many already sold and occupied.

Down the river at Clydebank, students at Clydebank College started the 2007/2008 academic year in brand new purpose-built accommodation overlooking the river. Forty years ago the John Brown Shipyards were the site for the construction of the QE2. Now the area at Queens Quay has been transformed into a college campus, with adjacent business park accommodation.

=== Transport ===
Major transport infrastructure is essential to ensure that the whole area is properly connected, and a number of vital projects are underway. For example, the Clyde Arc, also known as the "Squinty Bridge", was opened, the first road bridge to be built across the Clyde in Glasgow for almost 40 years. The bridge provides an important link between the West End of Glasgow and the Digital Media Quarter at Pacific Quay, and on into Govan.

A pedestrian bridge known as the Tradeston Bridge, was opened in 2009 to link Glasgow's IFSD on the north bank with its planned developments of the south bank at Tradeston.

Renfrewshire Council are proposing a new road bridge to be built between Renfrew and Yoker. The site of the bridge would be at Renfrew Ferry. If built, the structure would more than likely replace the ferry service. As the Clyde is still an important area for shipping and is still used for ship building, a moveable bridge structure would have to be built to let vessels pass up and down the river. Initial estimates for construction are £50m. If given the go-ahead, construction would start in 2018-19.

=== Culture and leisure ===
With the announcement that the Commonwealth Games will be held in Glasgow in 2014, further developments are under way. A proposed stadium, OVO Hydro, will be a 12,500-seat arena at SECC. It will sustain 1,400 jobs and continue to attract visitors to the city long after the Games are over. Further hotel accommodation is also required to handle the growth in tourism that is anticipated for the city and there is a commitment to complete key transport infrastructure projects in the area in time for the Games.

Work was completed on the Riverside Museum project in 2011. Architect Zaha Hadid designed a landmark building which will house Glasgow's transport collection.

== Other Clyde Waterfront Regeneration projects ==
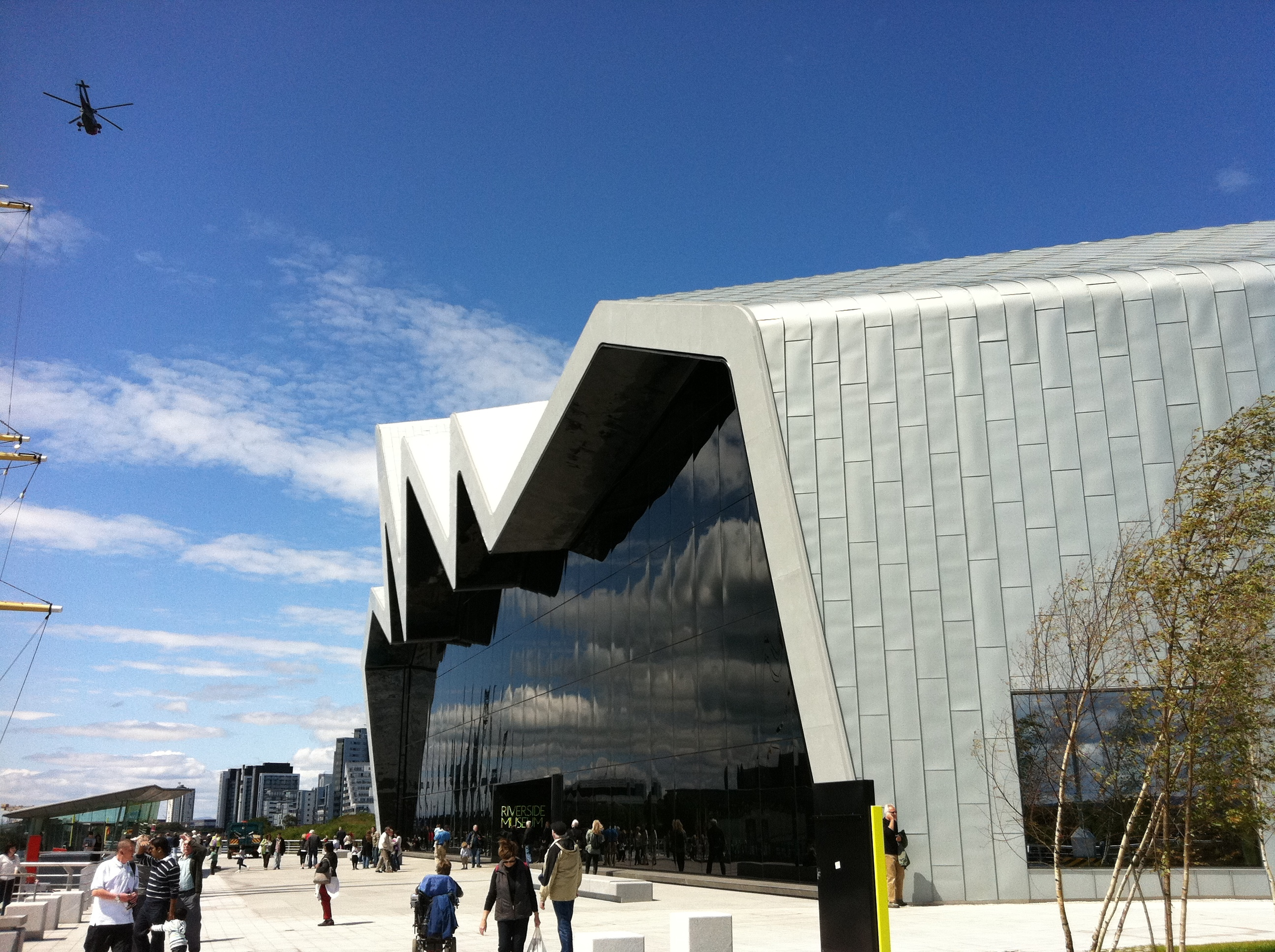
Riverside Museum

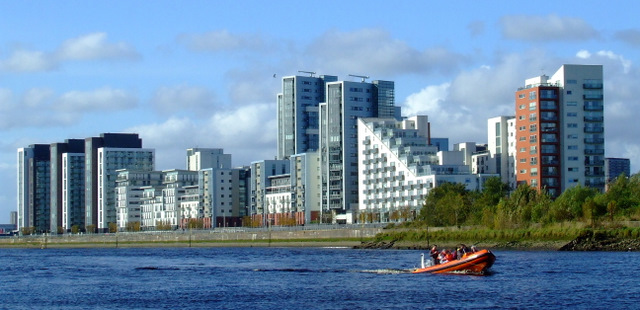
Glasgow Harbour

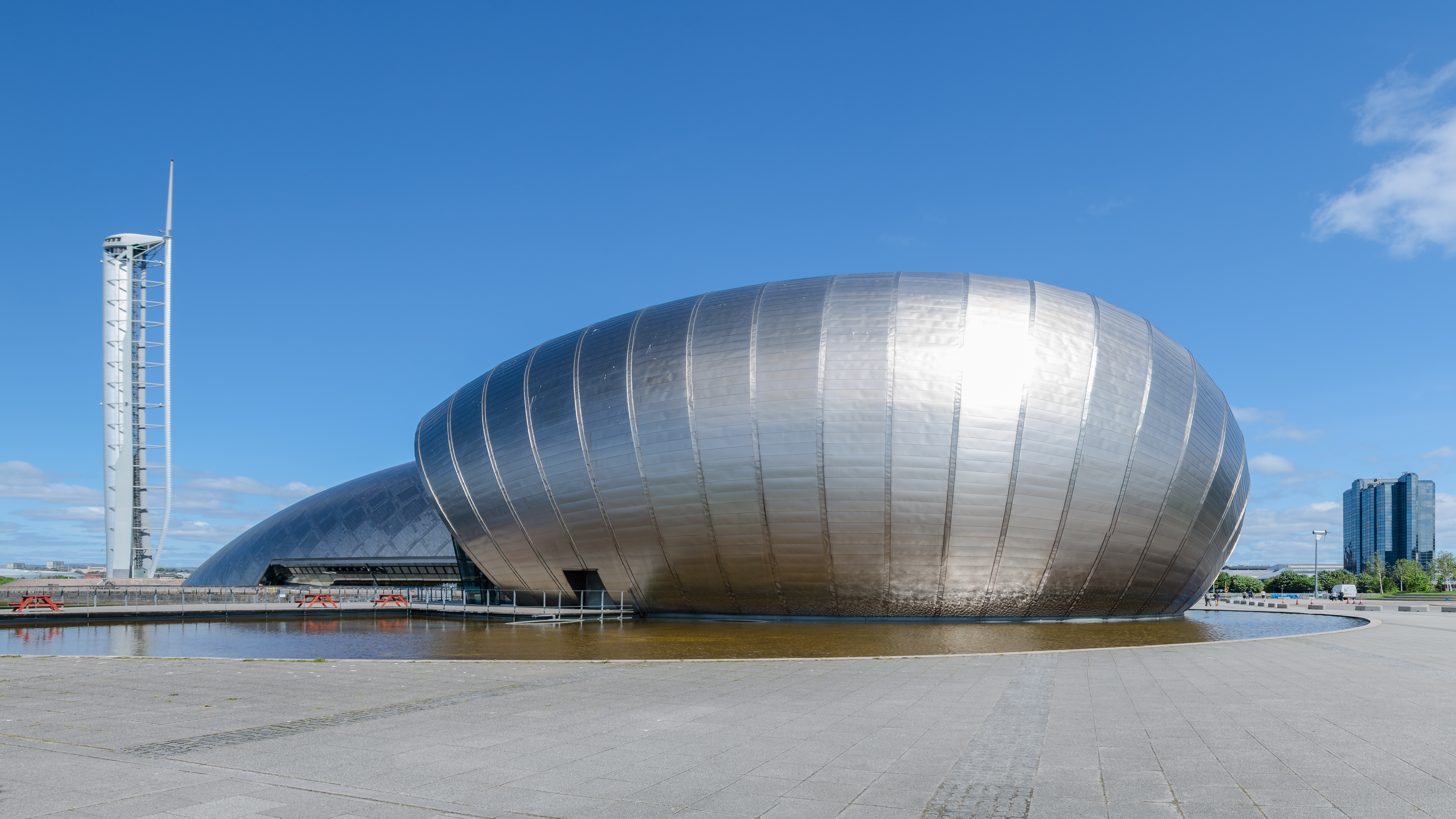
Glasgow Science Centre, Glasgow Tower and IMAX cinema

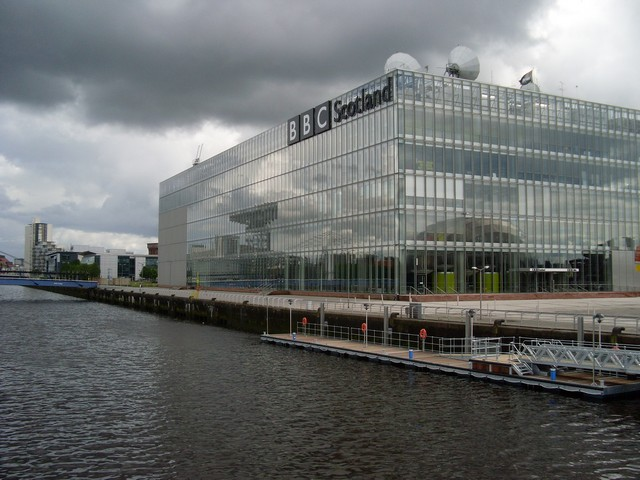
BBC Pacific Quay

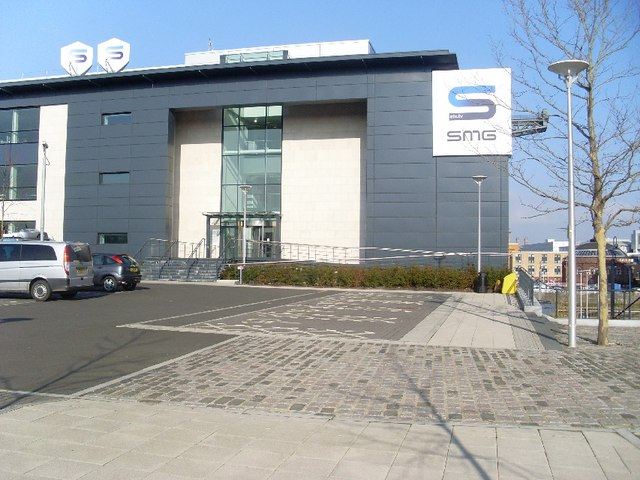
STV

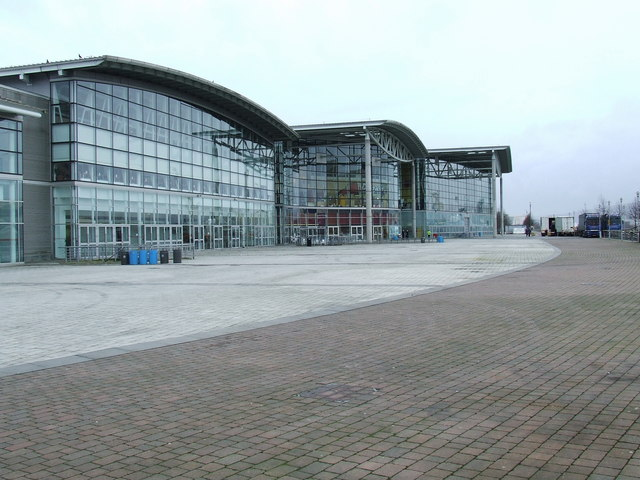
Braehead

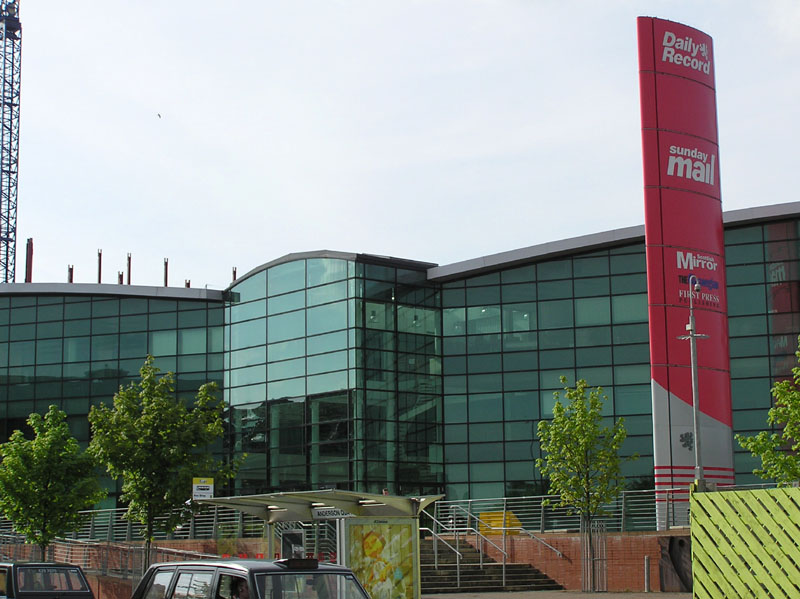
Daily Record

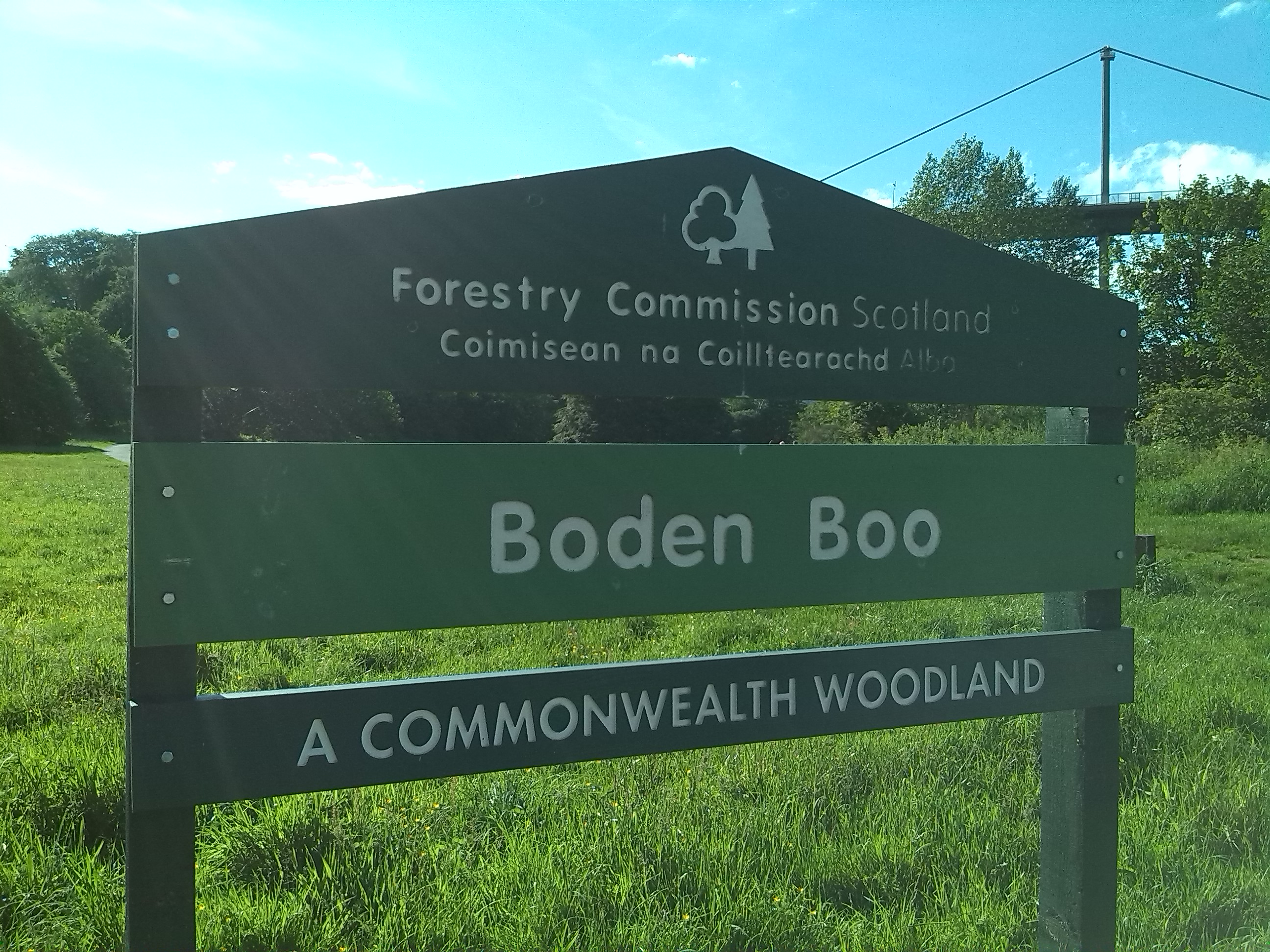
Boden Boo nature reserve at Erskine
