= MV Renfrew Rose =

Passenger ferry

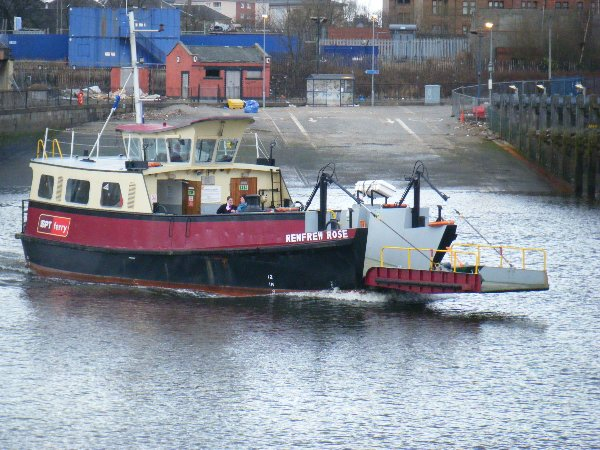
- MV Renfrew Rose in front of the Yoker slipway

History

United Kingdom
- Name: MV Renfrew Rose
- Owner: 1984-1994: Strathclyde Transport; 1994-2006: Renfrewshire Council; 2006-2010: SPT; 2010-2016: Arranmore Fast Ferry company; 2016-Present: Highland ferries
- Operator: Highland ferries
- Port of registry: Inverness
- Route: 1984-2010: Renfrew Ferry; 2010-2016: Burtonport to Arranmore island; since 2016: Cromarty to Nigg
- Builder: MacCrindle Shipbuilding Ltd, Ardrossan
- Yard number: 435
- Completed: 1984

General characteristics
- Type: Passenger Ferry
- Ramps: bow
- Capacity: 12 passengers 3 cars

MV Renfrew Rose is a passenger ferry built in 1984. She operated as the Renfrew Ferry between Renfrew and Yoker until mid 2010 when she became the Arranmore ferry carrying up to three cars. Since 2016, she has operated the Cromarty to Nigg ferry.

== History ==
Renfrew Rose was designed by Ian Nicolson and built in 1984 by MacCrindle Shipbuilding Ltd, Ardrossan.

== Service ==
Renfrew Rose and her sister ship, MV Yoker Swan, were operated by Strathclyde Partnership for Transport (SPT) as the Renfrew Ferry. Crossing the River Clyde between the town of Renfrew in Renfrewshire and the area of Yoker in Glasgow. it was the last operational Clyde crossing this far upstream, and the closest to Glasgow City Centre.

SPT announced on 22 January 2010 that the service was to close at the end of March 2010. They withdrew the service as part of moves to save £2.5M. The two vessels were approaching the end of their working life, and it was estimated that it would cost £2 million to replace them. Alternative services were investigated and a smaller passenger ferry replaced them as the Clydelink service.

After the SPT service ended, Renfrew Rose and her sister, Yoker Swan were purchased by the Arranmore Fast Ferry company for use on the Burtonport to Arranmore island route in County Donegal, Ireland. Repainted in their blue and white livery, they now carry up to three cars.

In May 2016, Renfrew Rose was purchased by the Highland Ferry company to operate the Cromarty to Nigg ferry service, linking the Black Isle to Easter Ross. This service was previously run by Cromarty Rose (from 1986 to 2010), and Cromarty Queen (from 2011 until 2014).

== Layout ==
The ferry has a front ramp, which is accessed directly from the concrete slipways on both sides of the river. These give access to the front deck and an enclosed passenger cabin, which provides some shelter during the 2-minute crossing.
