= Tour boat =

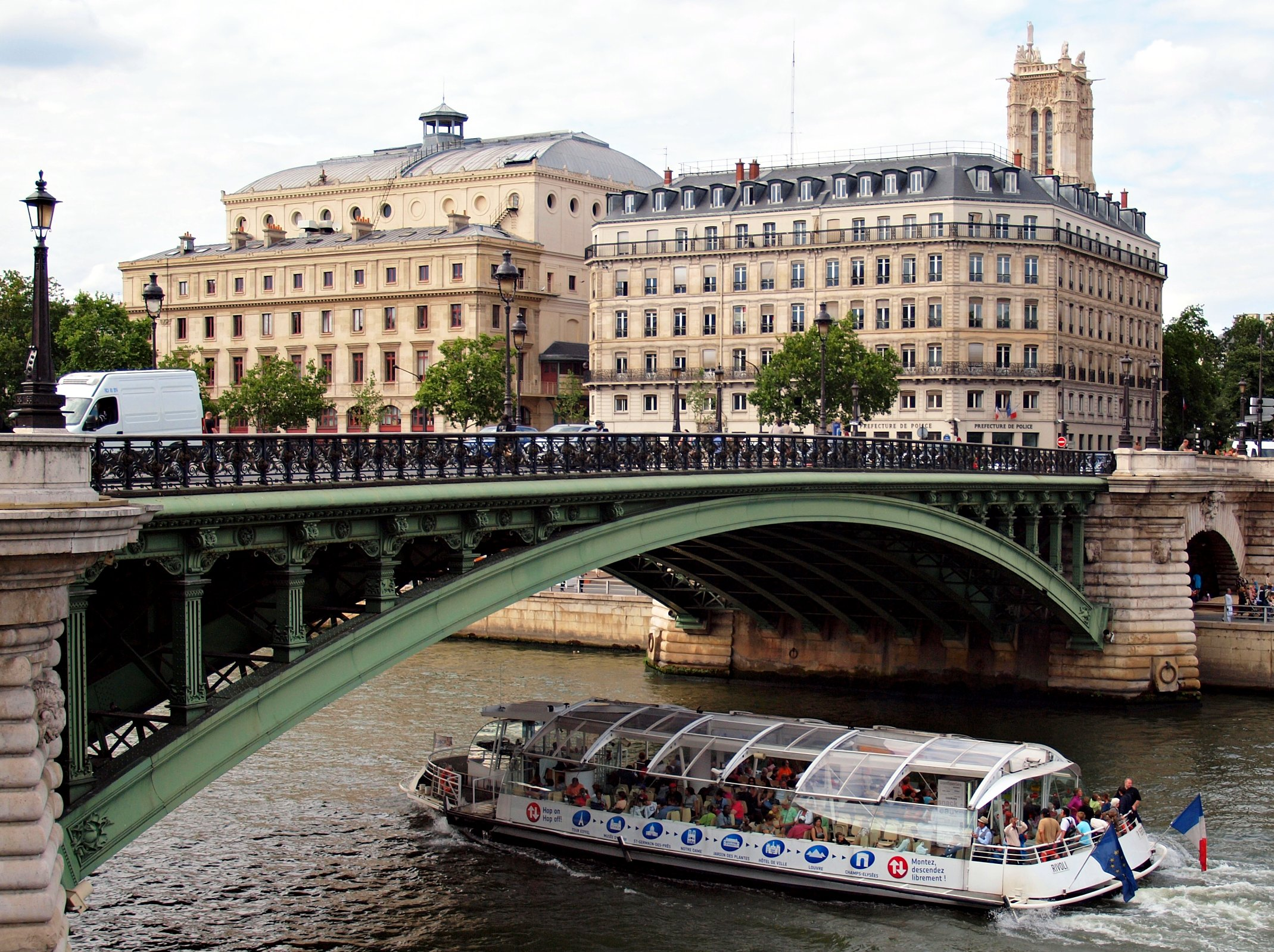
Tour boat in Paris

A tour boat, or sightseeing boat, is a boat used, and frequently purpose-built or adapted, for boat tours, a type of tourism frequently offered in much visited towns and cities of historic interest, that have canals or a river running through it, or that lie on a coast or a lake.

== Design and construction ==
To maximize the view outside for all (paying) passengers, a tour boat is usually constructed with a maximum amount and size of windows, possibly including a glazed roof, sometimes yielding a greenhouse-like superstructure. In order to be able to pass under small, low, sometimes centuries old little bridges, over canals in historic city centers, such tour boats may have a very specific design, lying very low in the water, with passengers sometimes sitting up to their waist below the water line, as well as being short and narrow, to allow making very tight turns around canals.

To minimize their burden on local residents and/or the natural environment, tour boats can be powered with silent running, zero emissions electric drive. In 2004, the Netherlands Energy Research Centre, ECN, and Canal Cruises Delft researched the option of running the Delft tour bouts using hydrogen fuel cells. In Amsterdam, a 100 passenger capacity hydrogen power tour boat was taken into service in 2006.

=== "Duck tour" amphibious truck and bus designs ===
A specific sub-type of tour boat is the duck tour vehicle or amphibious bus. In World War II, the United States built and deployed over 20,000 DUKW 2½-ton payload, 6x6 drive, amphibious trucks; and upon winning the war, many became surplus, and were left (sold or donated) in the liberated countries. In many countries these very robust vehicles were adapted, and proved very suitable in their new role of amphibious tour bus / boats.
In the Netherlands, company Amfibus has built multiple purpose-constructed amphibious tour-buses, that are propelled by pump-jets when in the water. The amfibus in Rotterdam has been in operation since 2011 for tourists, making 1,200 trips a year, carrying some 40,000 passengers.

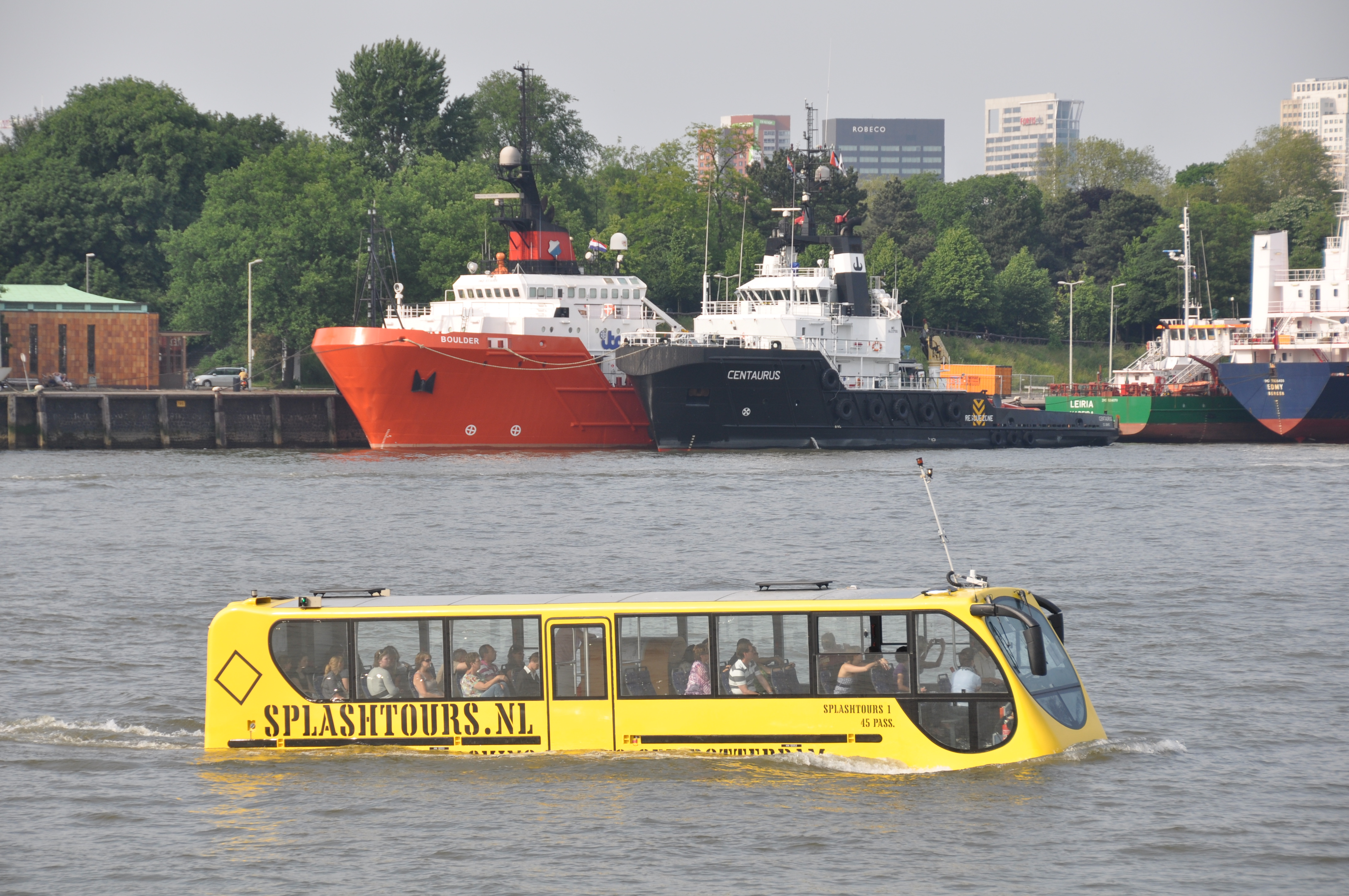
Splashtours amphibious 'Amfibus' in Rotterdam

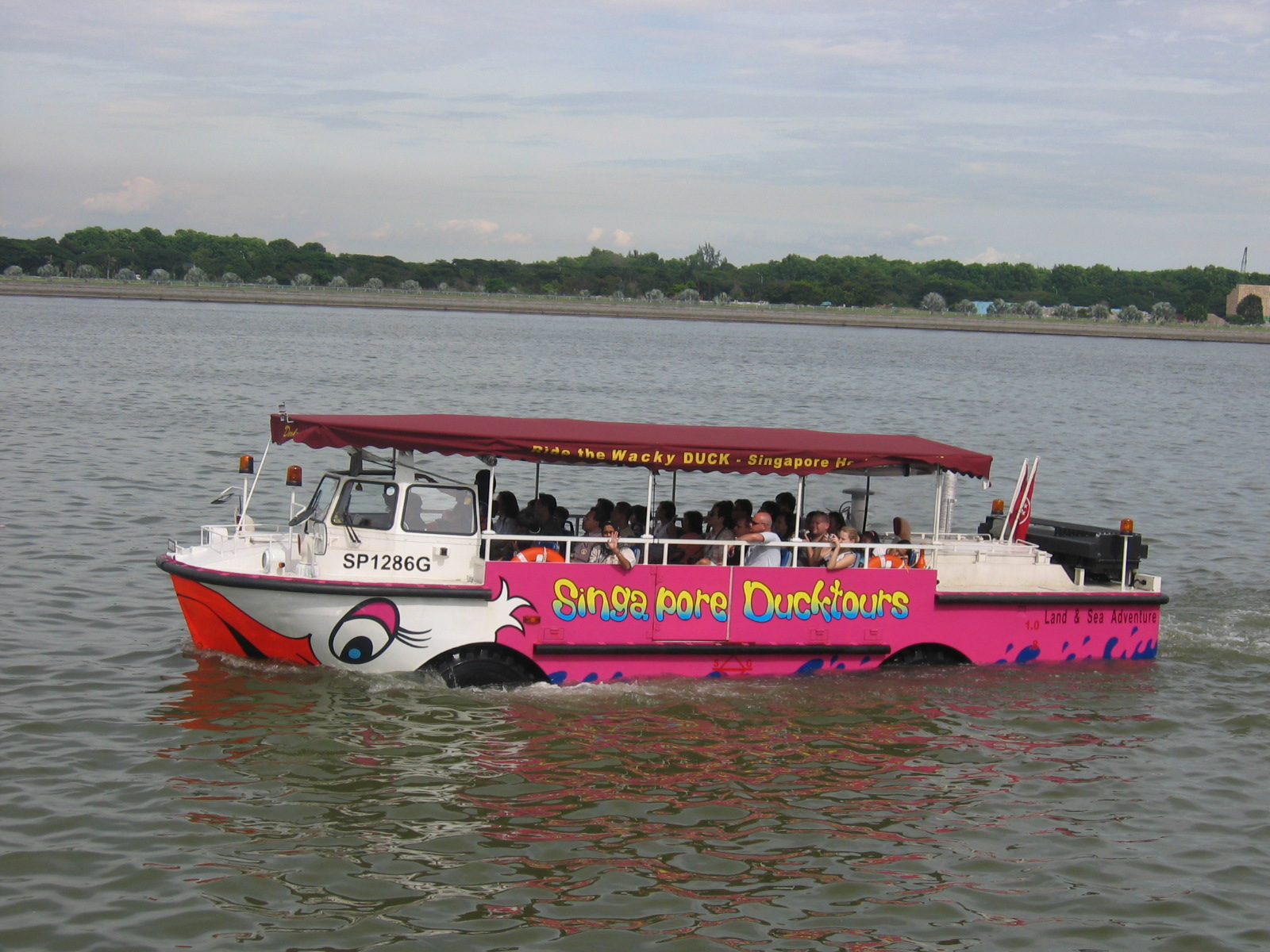
Duck tour in Singapore

== Netherlands ==
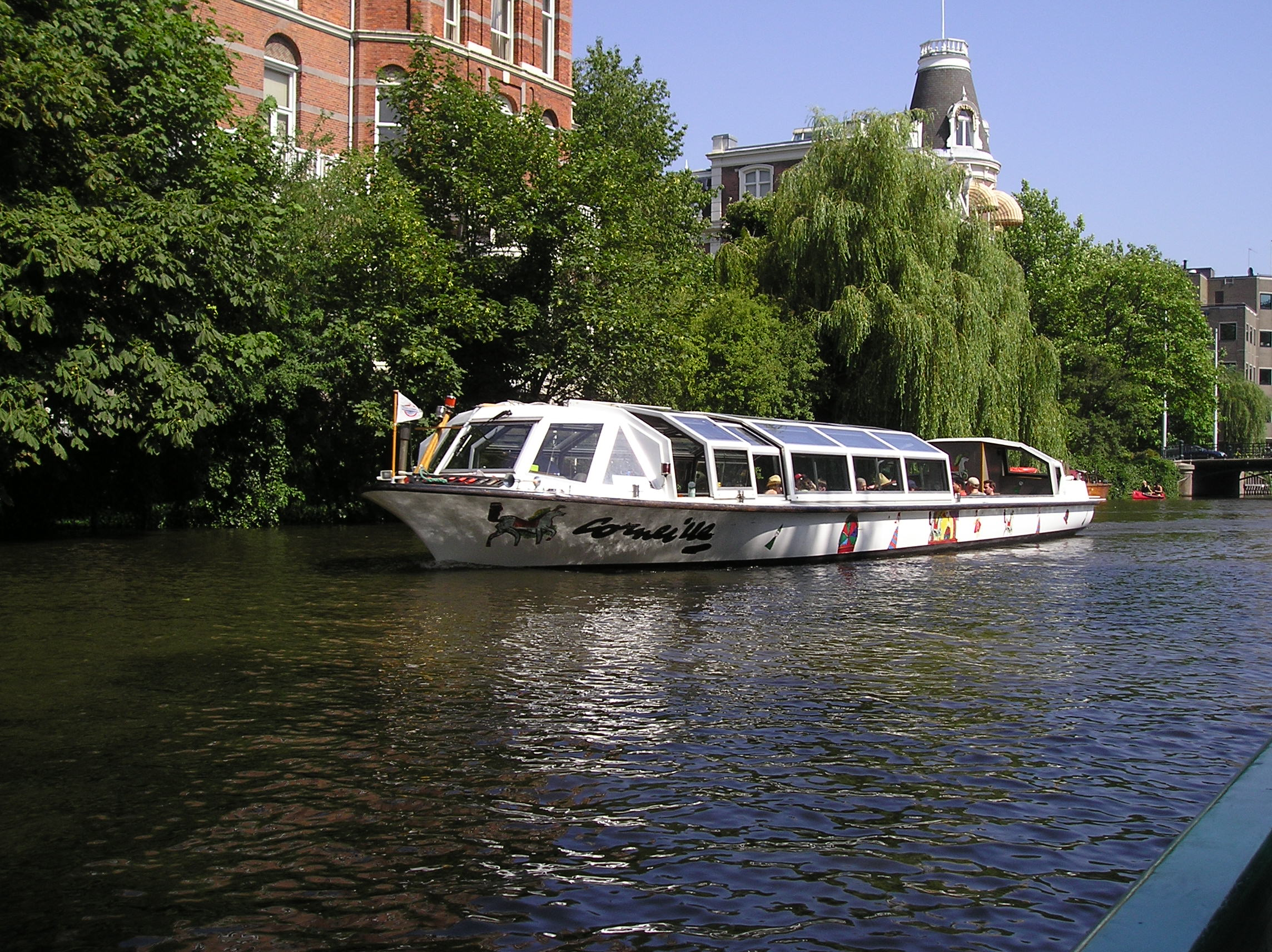
Tour boat in Amsterdam

In the Netherlands, boat tours are offered in many larger towns and cities with grachten and/or singels (intra-urban canals), like in Amsterdam, Delft, Leiden, Utrecht and Groningen. In Maastricht a river cruise on the Meuse is offered, including to adjacent Liège in Belgium. From Rotterdam center, the Port of Rotterdam can be cruised, over the "New Meuse", now a distributary of the Rhine (river), but formerly a distributary of the Meuse (river).

In 2010, boat tours through the Amsterdam Canal District hosted a record setting 3,072,000 visitors, making them the busiest tourist attraction in the country.

== See also ==
- Bateaux Mouches on the River Seine in Paris, France
- Chao Phraya Express Boat on the Chao Phraya River in Thailand
- Jaws theme park boat tour, Florida, USA
- Maid of the Mist at the Niagara Falls, Canada/United States

== See also ==
- Narrowboat
- List of boat types
