= MacCrindle Shipbuilding =

Shipbuilder in Ardrossan, Scotland

MacCrindle Shipbuilding Ltd was a shipbuilder in Ardrossan, Scotland.

== History ==
Ardrossan Shipyard built the South or New Shipyard in about 1916, with the first keel plate laid there in 1918. The yard covered 22 acres (89,000 m^{2}) and had five building berths capable of accommodating 400-500 ft boats of up to 9000 tons. The shipyard allowed vessels to be launched directly into the Firth of Clyde.

Vessels launched from the south yard:-

Yard No	Name	Type	Launch	Notes
	SS Hunstanworth			2580 gross tons
305	SS Glassford	Cargo Vessel	1919	2580 gross tons; Pennant Shipping, Cardiff
309	SS Poljana	Cargo Vessel	1919	3886 gross tons; Winge & Co., Christiania
310	SS Dunkerquois	Cargo Vessel	1920	3160 gross tons
312	SS Skrymer		9 October 1920	1990 gross tons

The yard closed in 1930. By 1969, some of the land was acquired by the McCrindle group, who continued the tradition of small shipbuilding in Ardrossan. McCrindle Shipbuilding was formed in 1976. They took over the yard number sequence of the earlier Ardrossan Dockyard, and became the last operating shipbuilder in the town.

McCrindle Shipbuilding finished their last ship, the trawler Spes Melior V, in 1990.

== Ships built ==
Yard No	Name	Type	Launch	Notes
434	Maid of Glencoul	Kylesku then Corran Ferry	3 September 1975	Highland Regional Council
	Stanes Moor	Sullom Voe Workboat	before 1984	
435	Renfrew Rose	Renfrew Ferry	1984	Strathclyde Passenger Transport Executive
436	Yoker Swan	Renfrew Ferry	1984	Strathclyde Passenger Transport Executive
439	Cromarty Rose	Nigg Ferry	1986	
440	Renown	Trawler	1987	J. W. Buchan & Partners, Fraserburgh
438	Steadfast III	Trawler	1987	A. M. Gardner & Partners, Anstruther
441	Rymarlee	Trawler	1988	Arthur Duthie & Co, Inverness
442	Spes Melior V	Trawler	1990	was Amadeus; now Rachel Jay
