= Renfrew Bridge =

Bridge in Renfrewshrie, Scotland

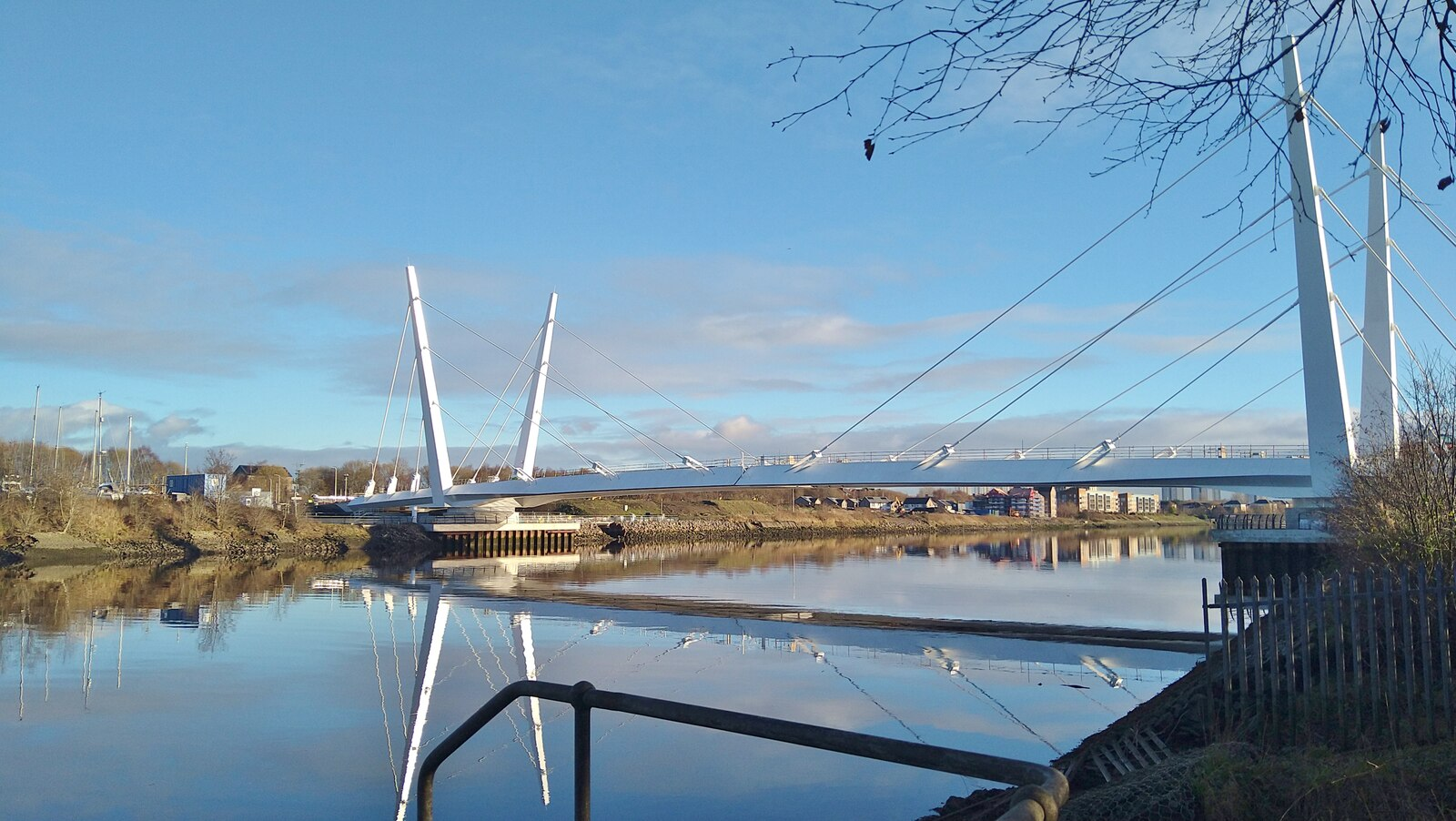
- Renfrew Bridge
- Coordinates: 55.8891423°N 4.3928917°W
- Carries: Motor vehicles, cyclists and pedestrians
- Crosses: River Clyde
- Locale: West Dunbartonshire; Renfrewshire

Characteristics
- Longest span: 184 m (604 ft)

History
- Construction cost: £117 million
- Opened: 9 May 2025
- Replaces: Renfrew Ferry

Location
- Interactive map of Renfrew Bridge

The Renfrew Bridge is a road and pedestrian bridge spanning the River Clyde in West Dunbartonshire and Renfrewshire, built as part of the ongoing Clyde Waterfront Regeneration. Opened to the public on 9 May 2025, it is the first new crossing point on the Clyde since the Govan–Partick Bridge was built in 2024.

== Proposal ==
Renfrewshire Council proposed a new road bridge to be built between Renfrew and Yoker/Clydebank (the north landing point being on the boundary between the City of Glasgow and West Dunbartonshire local authority areas). The site of the bridge is a short distance downstream (west) from the former Renfrew Ferry service. As the Clyde is still used for shipbuilding upriver of the proposed crossing at BAE Systems' yards in Scotstoun and Govan, a moveable bridge structure was required to let vessels pass up and down the river. Initial estimates for construction were £50 million, using City Deal funding.

In late 2018 the project was approved by the Scottish Government, but West Dunbartonshire Council later objected to the bridge with concerns about traffic levels. However, in February 2019, members of West Dunbartonshire Council's IRED committee unanimously voted to drop the council's objection to the project.

== History ==
=== Construction ===
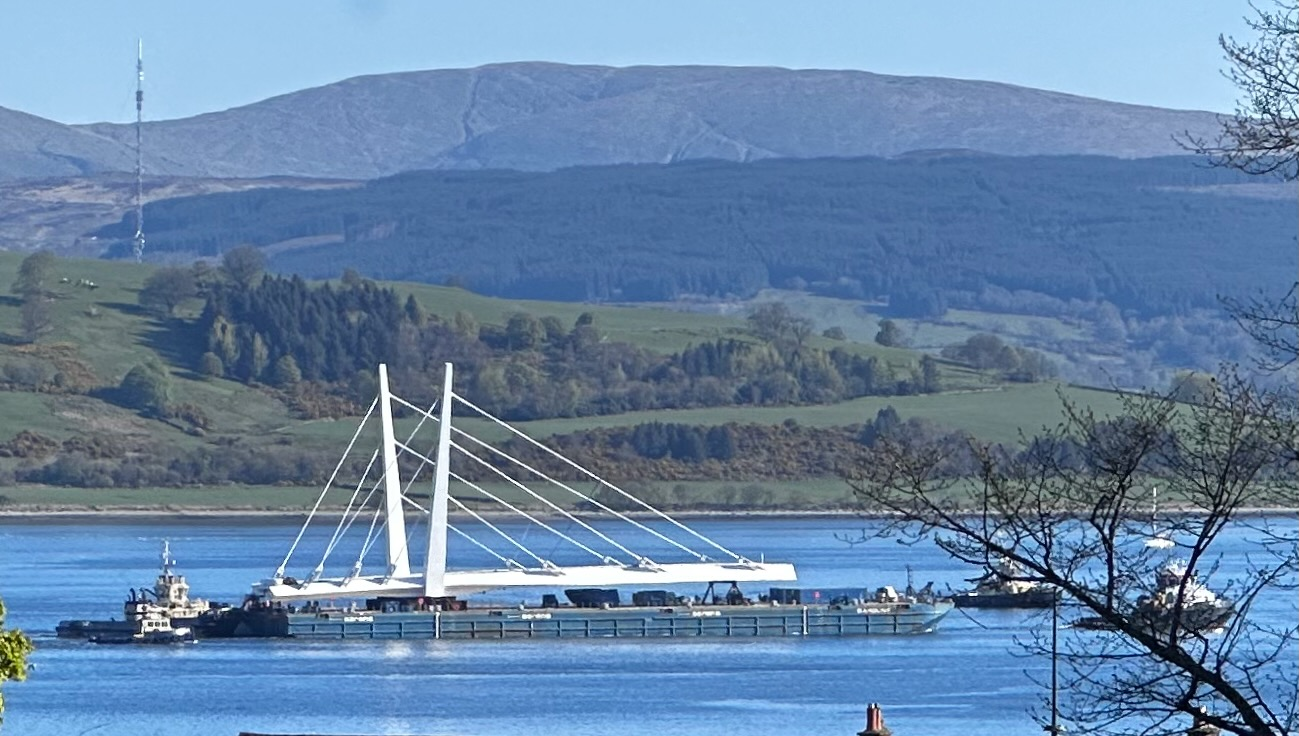
First section, on barge passing Portkil Bay, Firth of Clyde, in April 2024

The two main sections of the bridge were pre-constructed in the Netherlands, and transported by barge to the site in early 2024, to be installed over the course of that year.

=== Opening ===
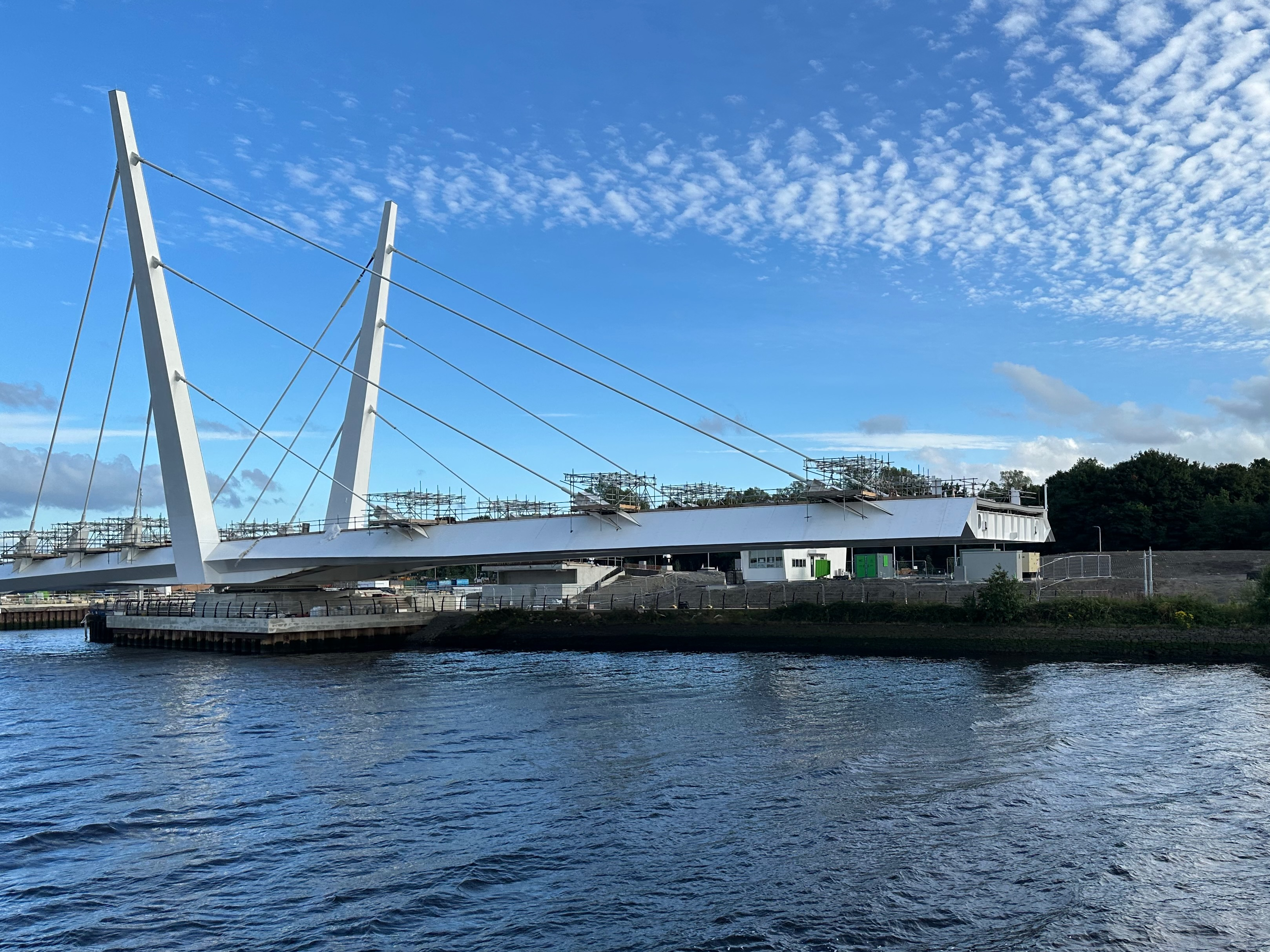
South section of the bridge undergoing testing prior to opening

The bridge was opened at midday on 9 May 2025, in a ceremony attended by locals as well as children from primary schools in Renfrew, Clydebank, and Yoker. As well as being attended by members of the Paisley Sea Cadets

=== Renfrew ferry ===
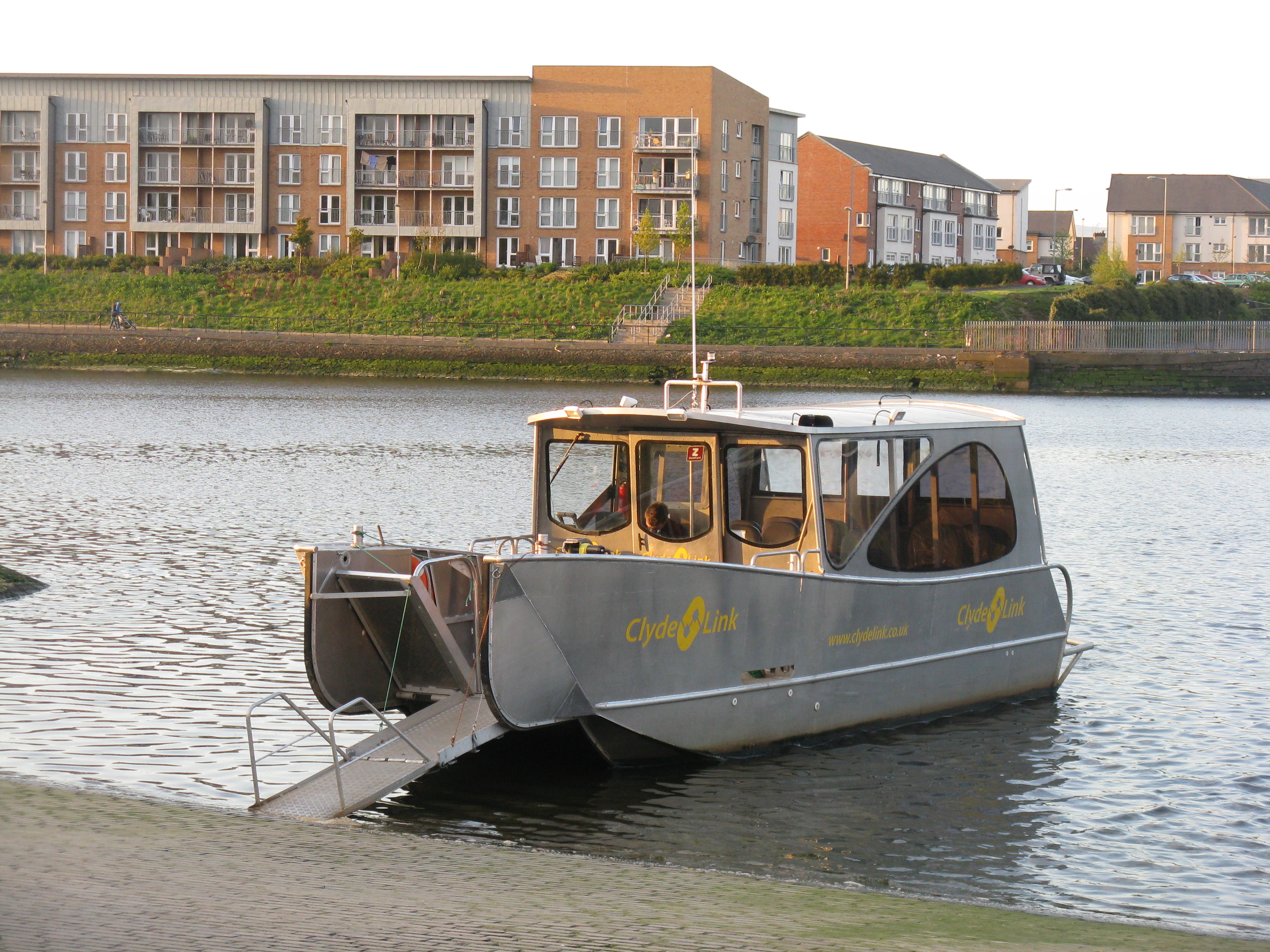
Renfrew Ferry

The Renfrew ferry initially continued operating after the bridge opened on 9 May 2025; however, the service ceased operation on 31 May, with the operator Clydelink stating that the bridge had reduced passenger numbers to an unsustainable level.

Due to damage and the resultant closure of the bridge caused by Storm Boelo in October 2026, there have been discussions over a return of the ferry service but as of 1st November 2026 nothing has been confirmed.

=== Non routine closures ===
On 23 June 2025 at 10:00, the bridge was closed after a suspicious item was found at a nearby building site. A bomb squad was sent to the scene, however it was established the item was not an explosive and the bridge reopened to the public at 12:40.

The bridge closed on 7 November 2025 after maintenance on the bridge discovered a flaw in its structure. It reopened on 10 November, with an extended closure due to take place on 12 November to complete the necessary repairs.

Due to damage caused by Storm Boelo in October 2026, the bridge had to close and was scheduled to remain inoperative for a number of months, being held in the open position due to legal obligations to allow the flow of river traffic.

== Bus Operations ==
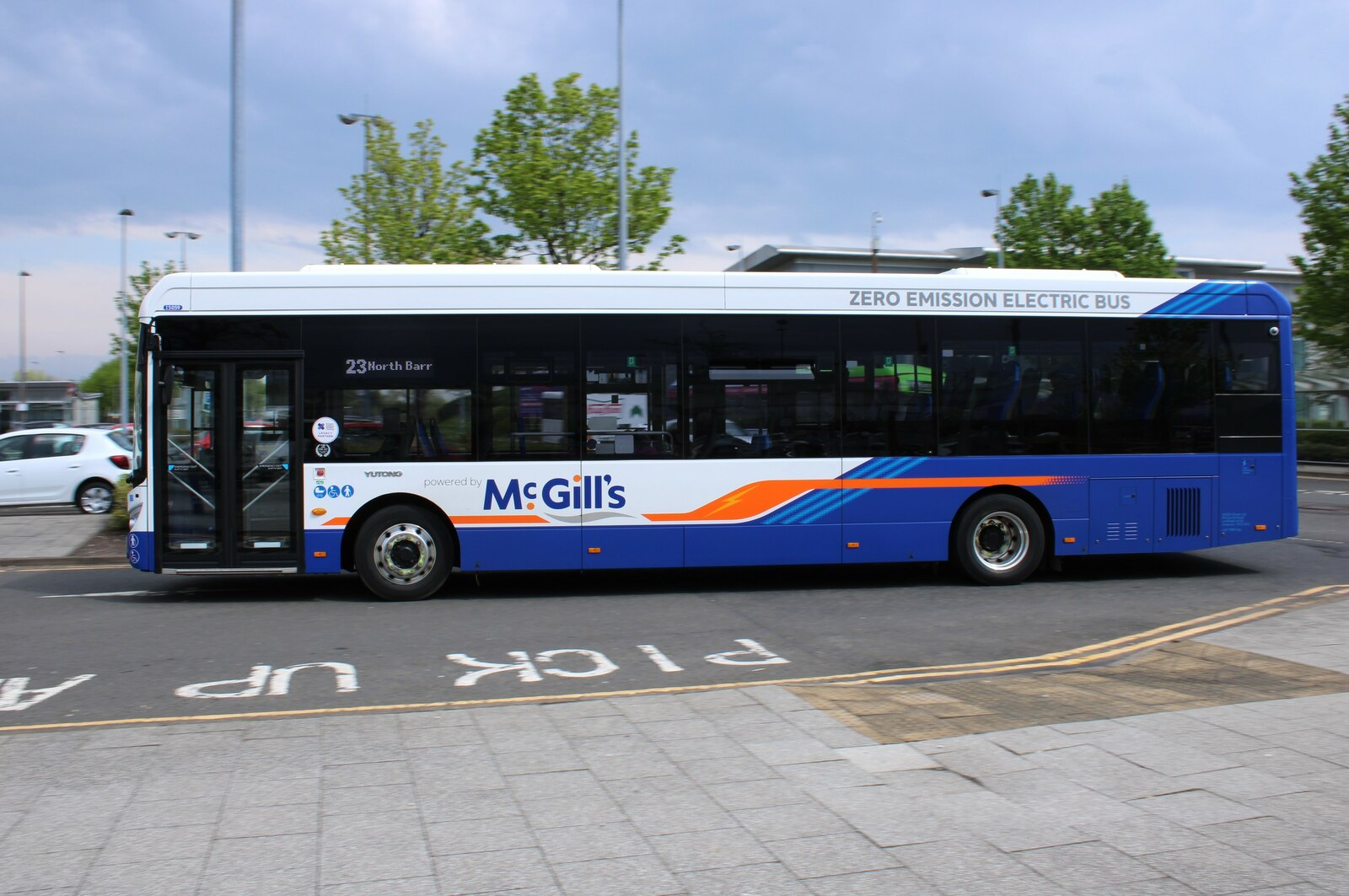
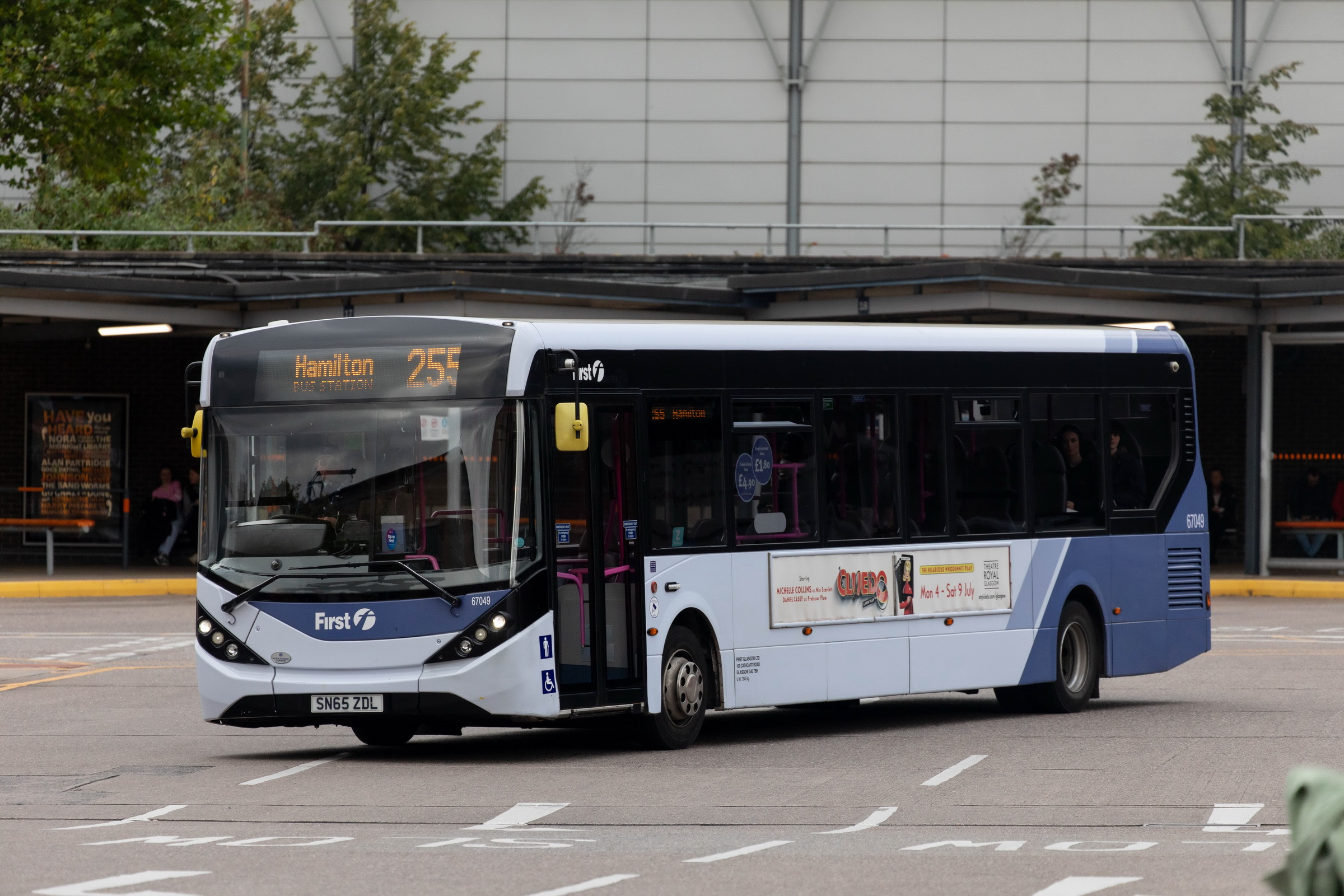
McGill's Buses (left); First Glasgow (right)

Local groups were in discussion before and after the bridge's opening in an attempt to secure a bus route crossing the bridge – this would be even more important due to the Renfrew ferry ceasing operations on 31 May 2025, making travelling between the two sides without a vehicle increasingly difficult. Discussions between Renfrew Community Council and McGill's Buses resulted in McGill's looking into the possibility of running a route over the bridge, but as of 13 June 2025 this had yet to be introduced. On the same date, First Glasgow announced that as of present it could not operate services over the bridge, citing unpredictability as the result of closures.

On 3 July 2026 McGill's Buses announced that they would pilot a bus service across the bridge connecting Clydebank, Braehead and the Queen Elizabeth University Hospital (QEUH). The service (Service 24) is due to operate hourly Monday to Saturday with services starting on 13 July 2026. In the event of a bridge closure it is noted that services will terminate on the south bank and not serve Clydebank.

On 24 October 2026 Scottish Citylink commenced operations of coach service '903' between Glasgow Airport and Edinburgh (with some services running to Blantyre in Lanarkshire) at a frequency of every hour with coaches crossing the bridge shortly after leaving the Airport. Making it the second bus route to cross the bridge. Aswell as that, Citylink also extended 1 route '900' service every evening to serve the airport, crossing the bridge in the process. In the event of a bridge closure, the route will redivert and avoid the bridge altogether.

== Gallery ==
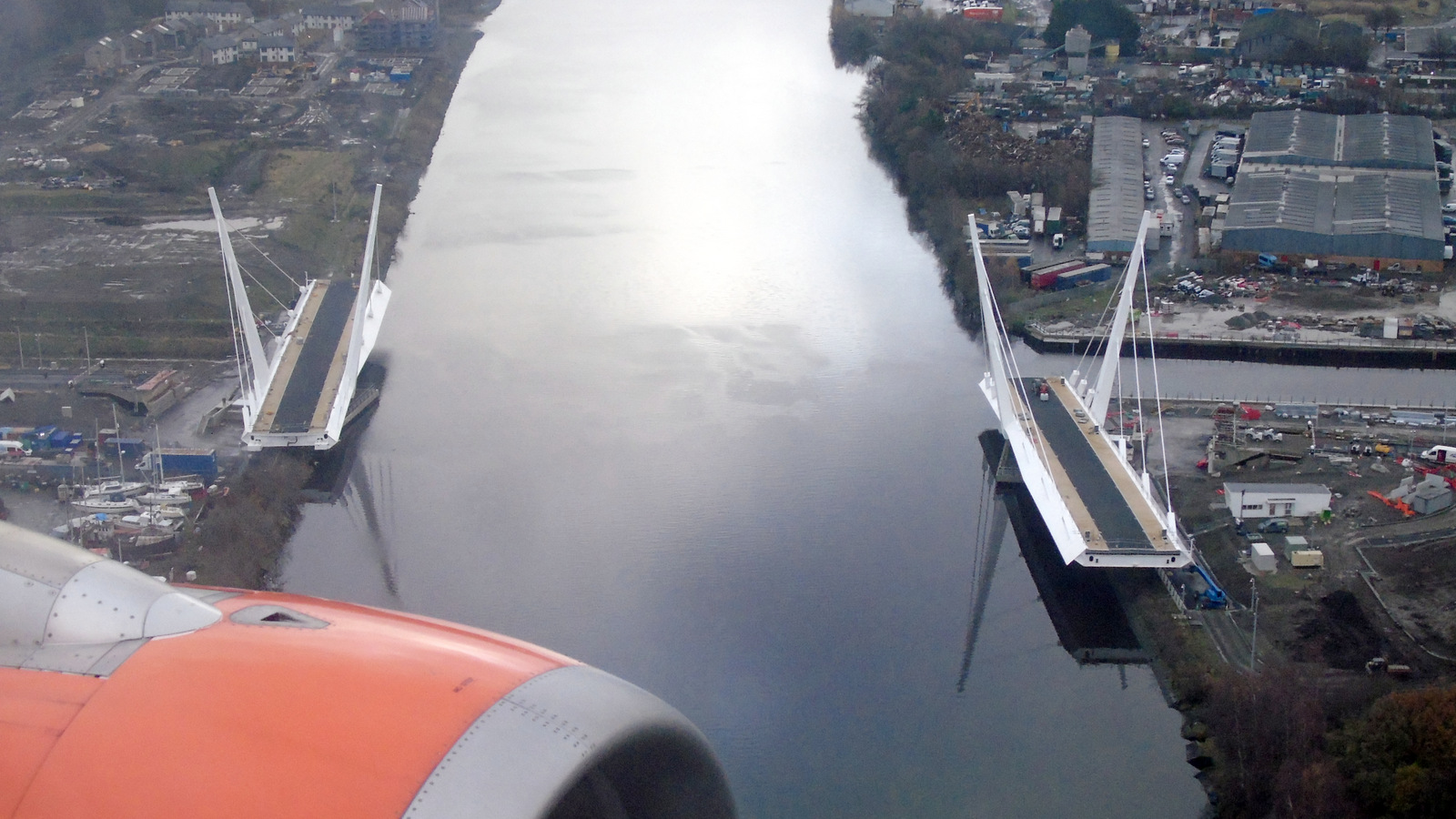
Renfrew bridge open during construction

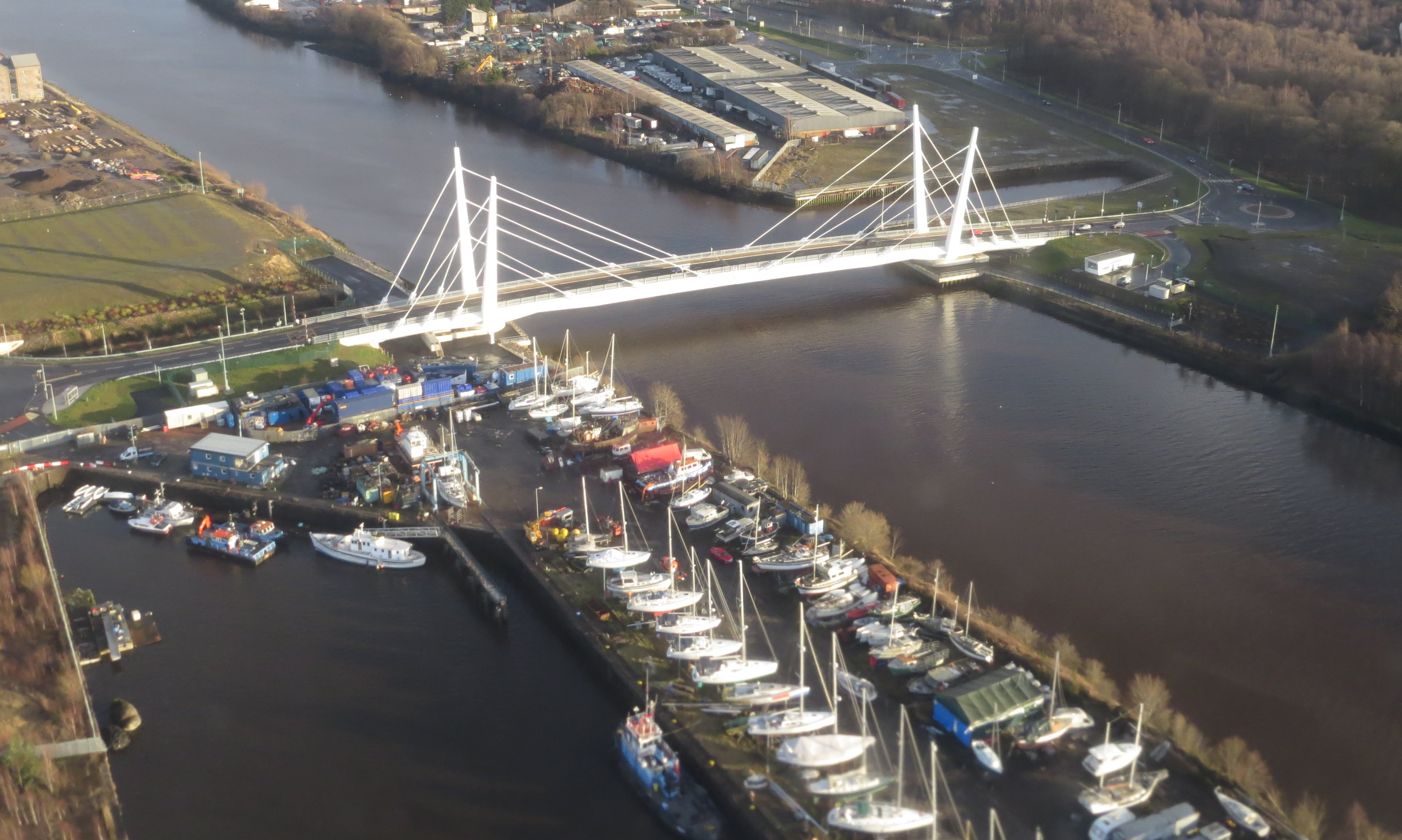
Renfrew bridge from above

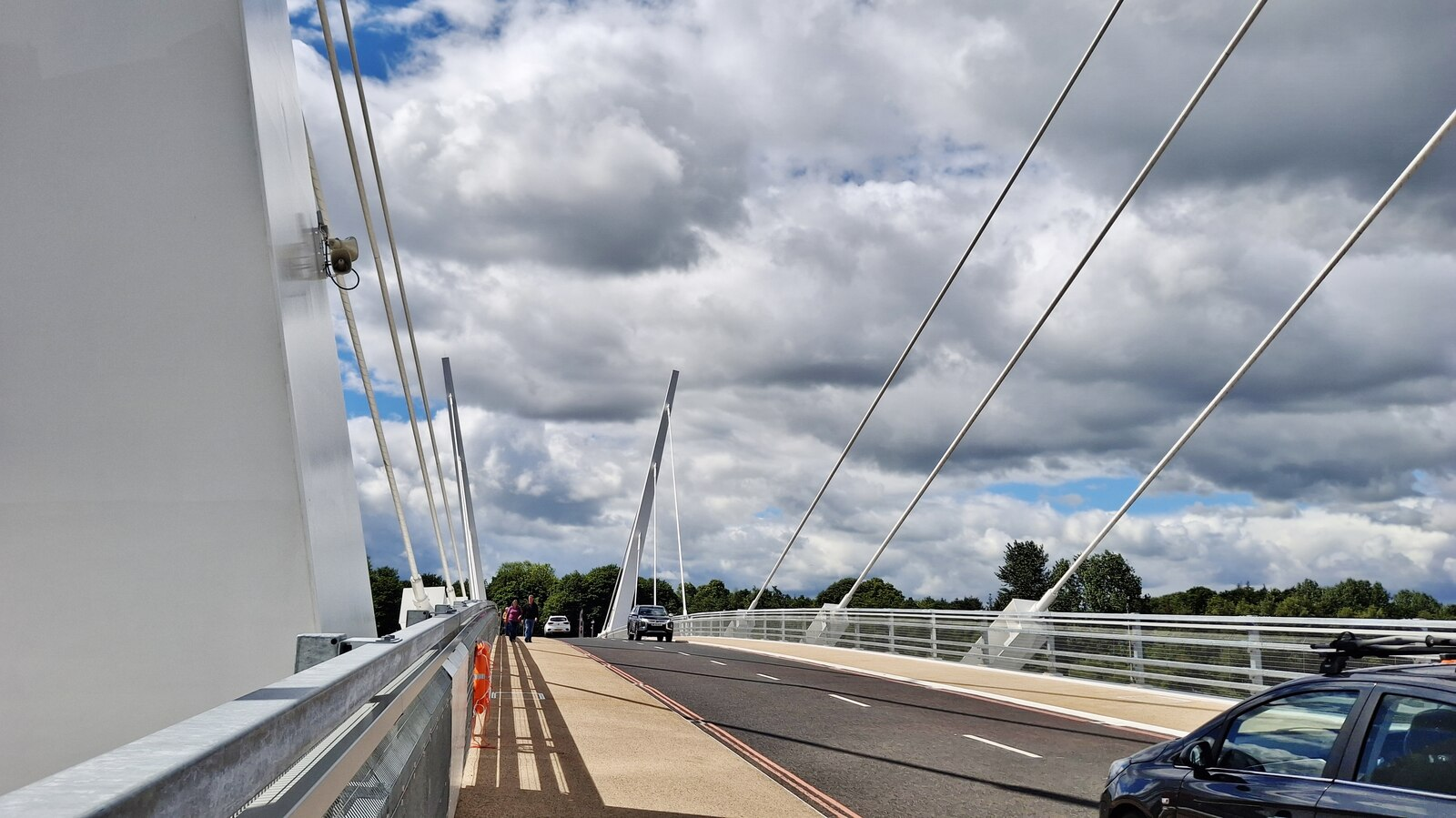
View of the bridge deck

== See also ==
- Govan–Partick Bridge, similar contemporaneous project upriver
- List of bridges in Scotland
