= Amfibus =

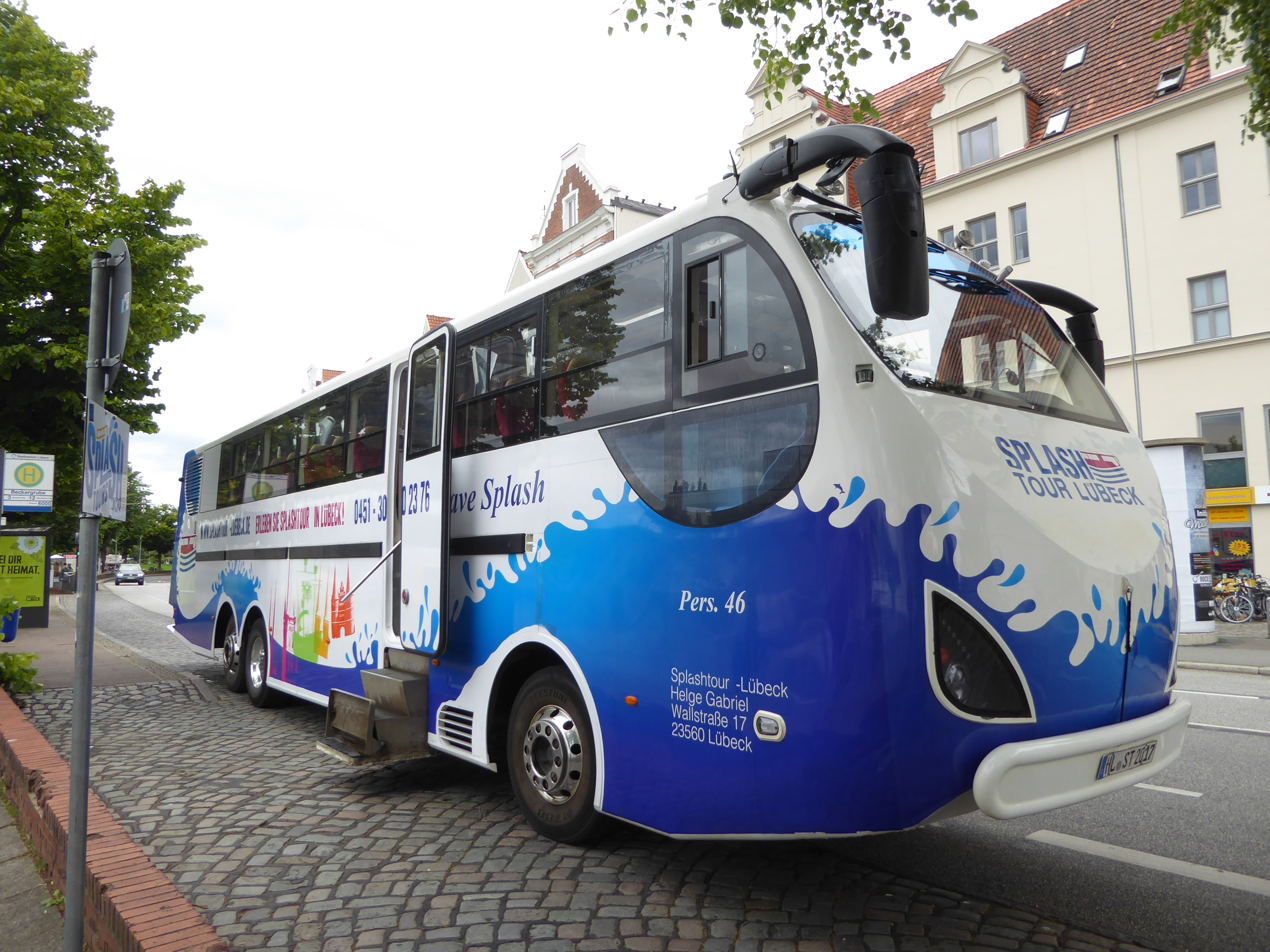
- Splashtour Amfibus in Lübeck, 2020

Overview
- Manufacturer: Dutch Amphibious Transport (DAT) Vehicles BV, Nijmegen
- Production: 2009 – present (2 or more)

Body and chassis
- Class: Amphibious
- Body style: Bus
- Layout: 55 seats

Powertrain
- Engine: Volvo DH12E 6 cylinder

Dimensions
- Wheelbase: 6.8 m
- Length: 13.80 m
- Width: 2.55 m
- Height: 3.8 m
- Kerb weight: 22.000 kg

The Amfibus is an amphibious bus, developed and built by DAT (Dutch Amphibious Transport) Vehicles B.V., in Nijmegen, Netherlands, which was considered as a replacement for the Renfrew Ferry across the River Clyde.

== Renfrew Ferry ==
When SPT ceased to operate the Renfrew Ferry on 31 March 2010, one option for replacement was the Amfibus, capable of both driving on the road and sailing across the river. The Amfibus had previously been trialled by Splashtours in Rotterdam Harbour, where it successfully coped with the wash from tugs and cargo ships. Trials on the Clyde took place on 8 and 9 February 2010. It was not without problems as one of the bus' airbags worked loose. The Amfibus was not selected to continue the service. However, in July 2011 a similar vehicle started a tourist cruise service running direct from Schiphol airport to the Amsterdam canals.

The contract to run the Renfrew Ferry was awarded to Silvers Marine, of Rosneath, who took over the running of the ferry from 1 April 2010 using fast boats.

== Service ==
Stagecoach proposed operating the Amfibus on a route between Braehead and Clydebank, entering and leaving the Clyde via existing slipways at Renfrew and Yoker.

== Design ==
The Amfibus is based on a Volvo chassis and made by Dutch Amphibious Transport (DAT) Vehicles BV, Nijmegen, Gelderland. An Amfibus cost £700,000 in 2010.

Propulsion in the water is by water jets. The Amfibus is capable of 60 mph (97 km/h) on land and 6.5 knots (12.0 km/h; 7.5 mph) on water.

== Gallery ==
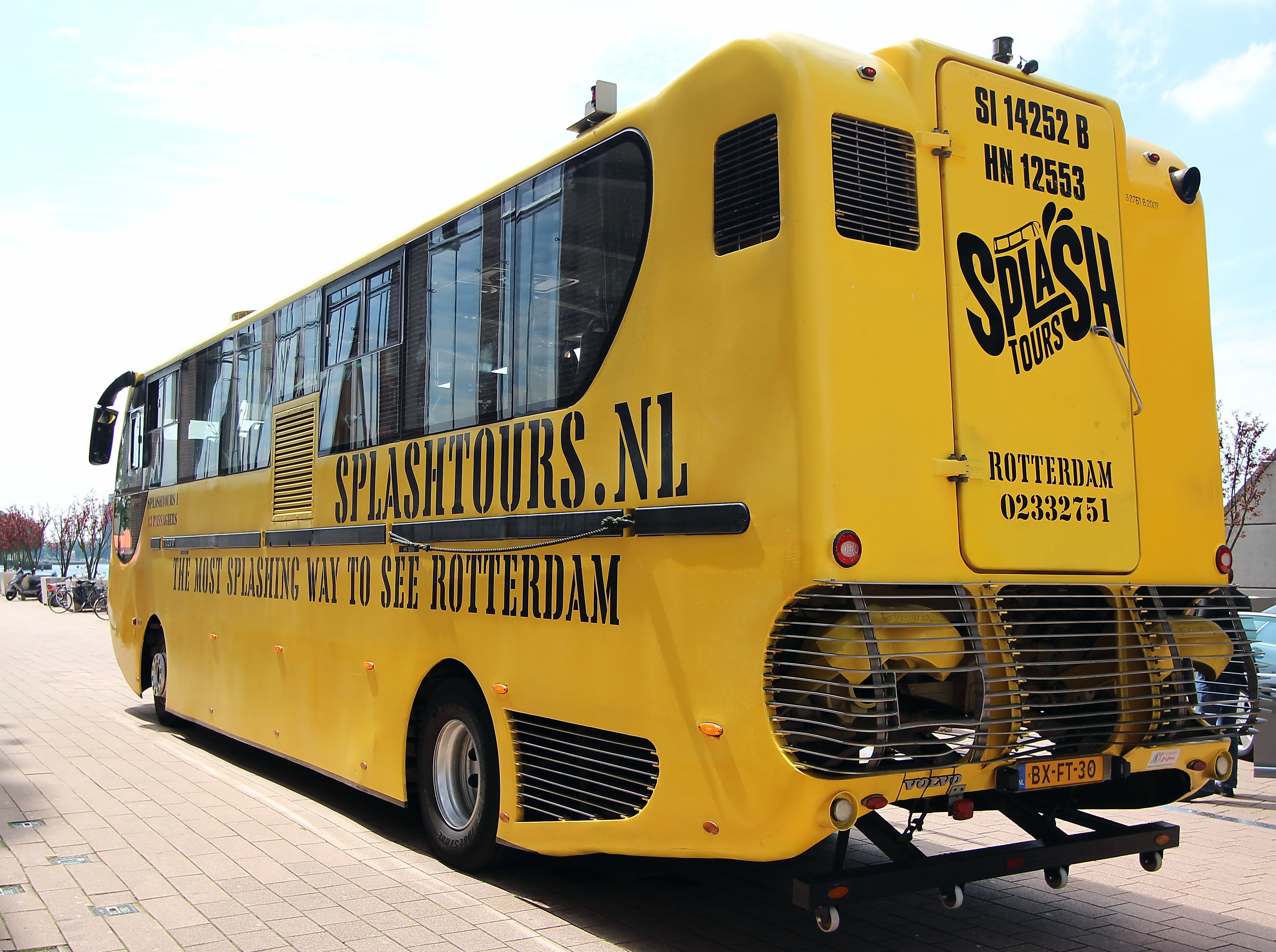
Impellers for in the water are built into the rear

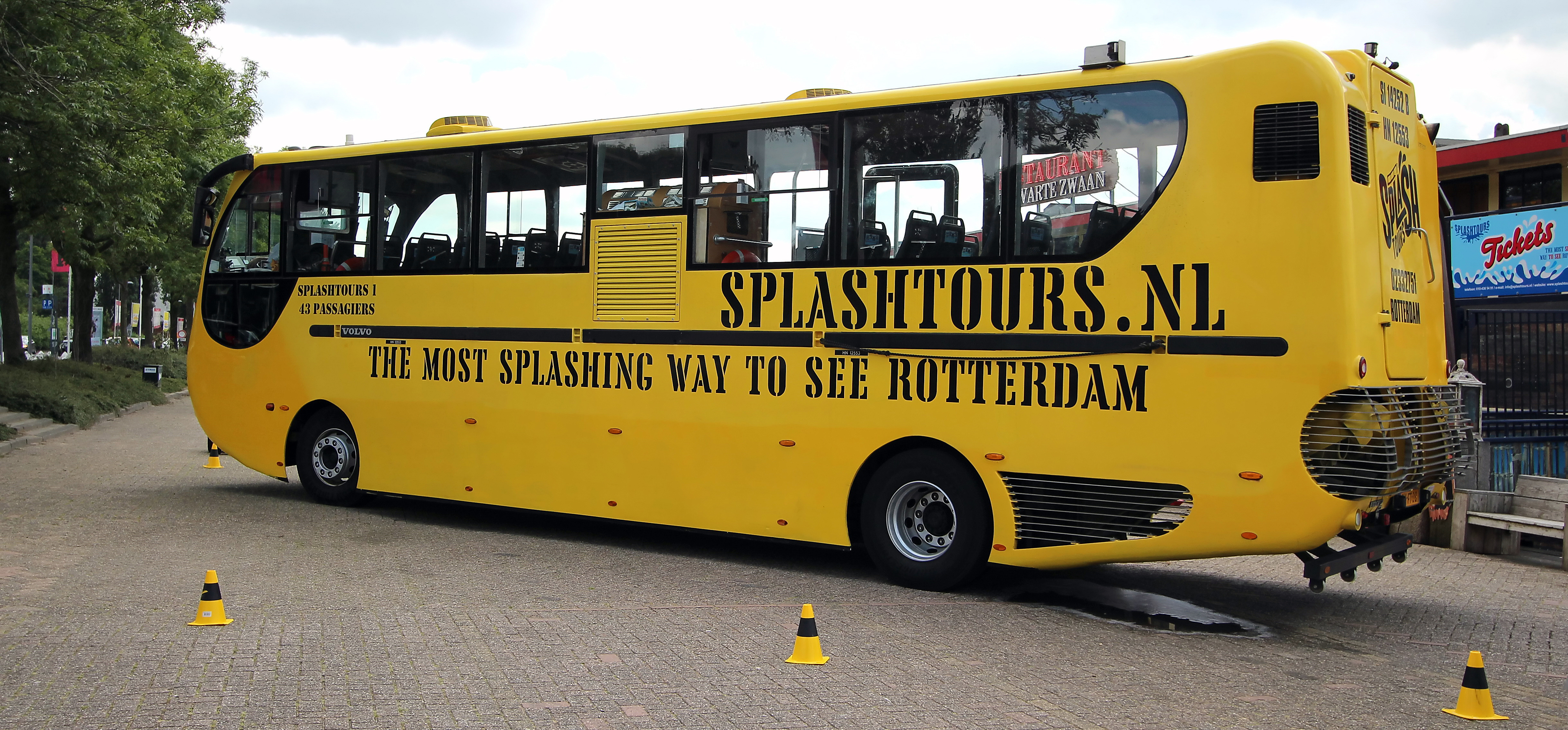
Amfibus Splashtours 1 side and rear view

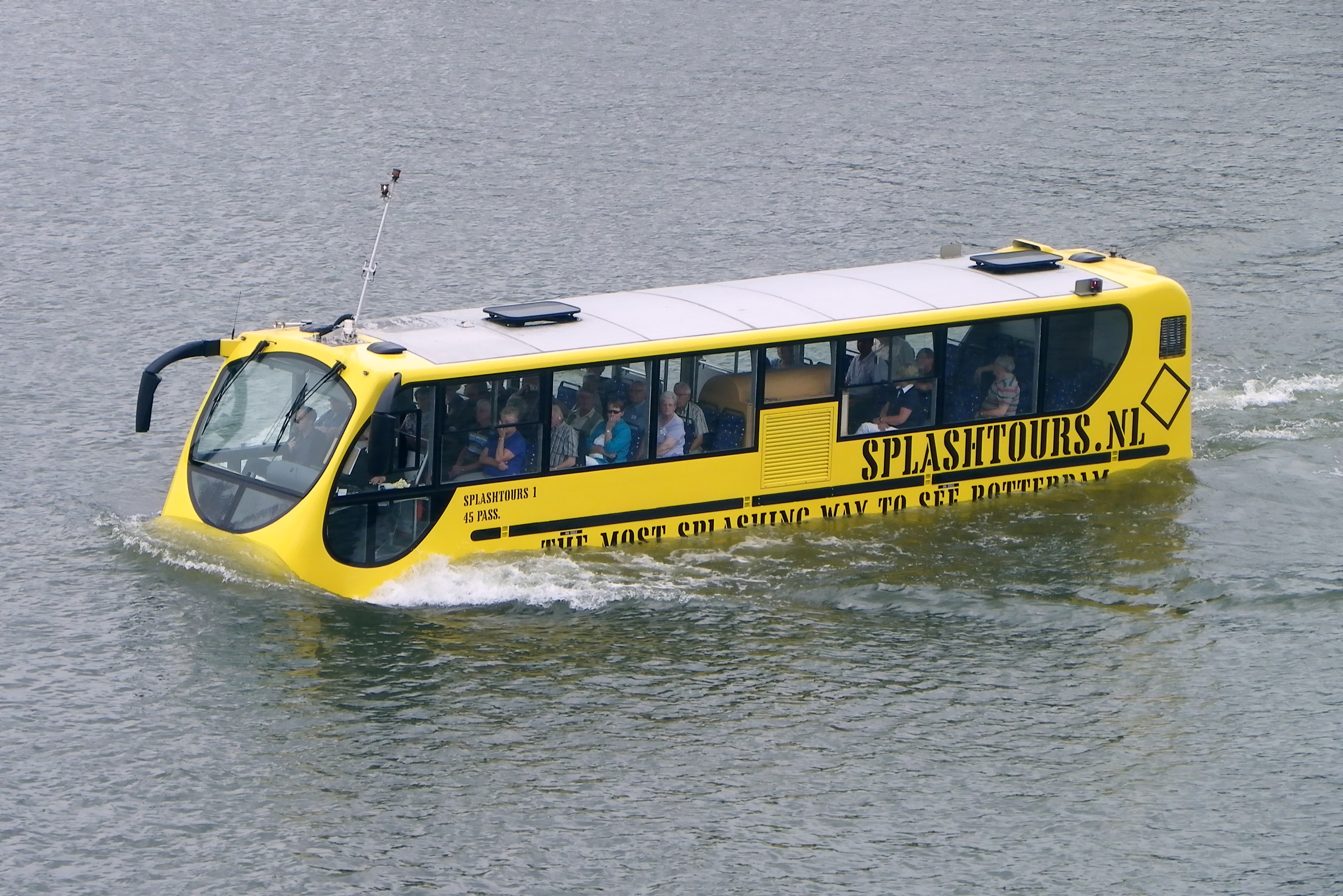
In the water in Rotterdam, 2010

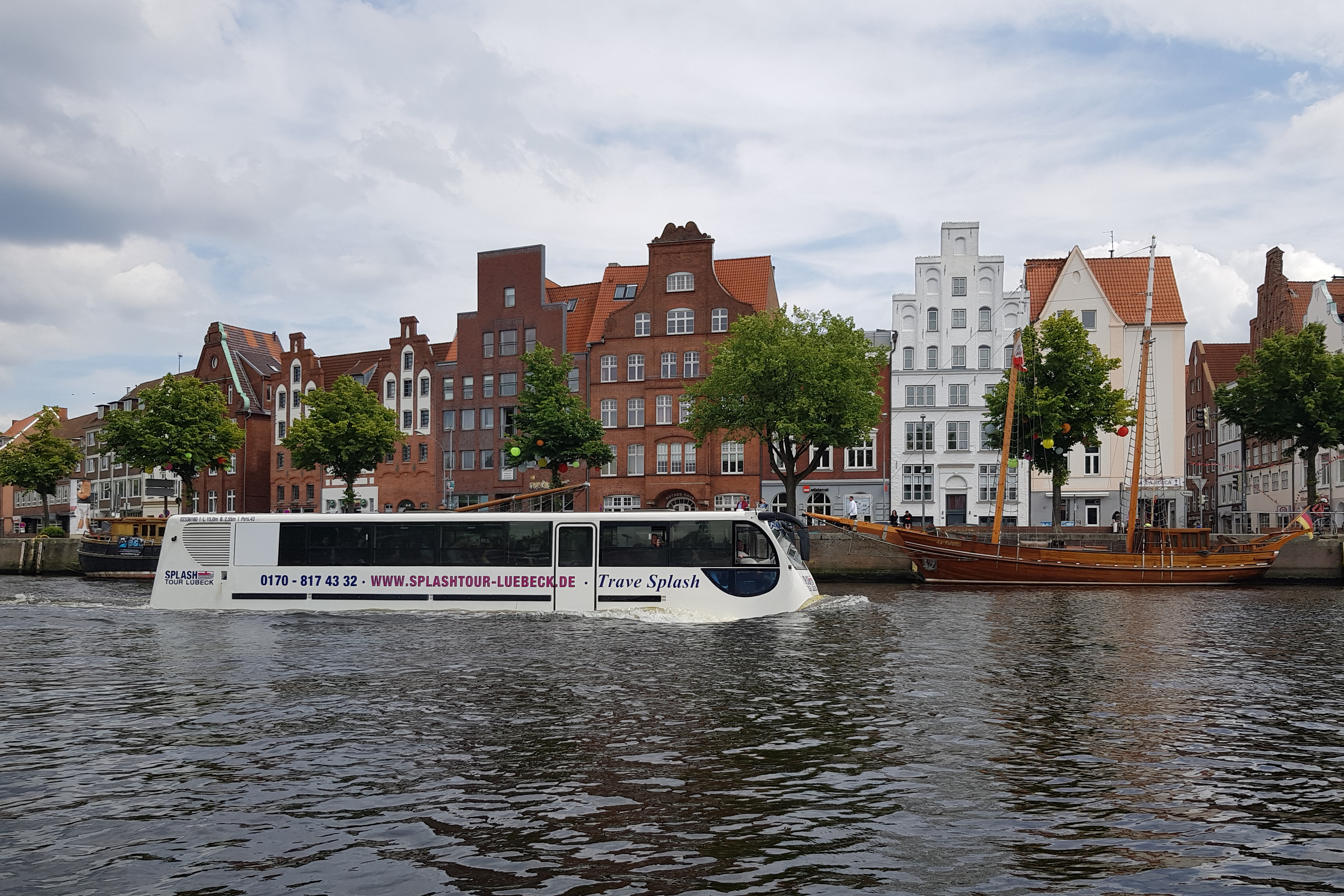
Amfibus on the Trave river in Lübeck's old town.

== See also ==
- List of buses
