= Cromarty Rose =

Vehicle ferry (1987–2009)

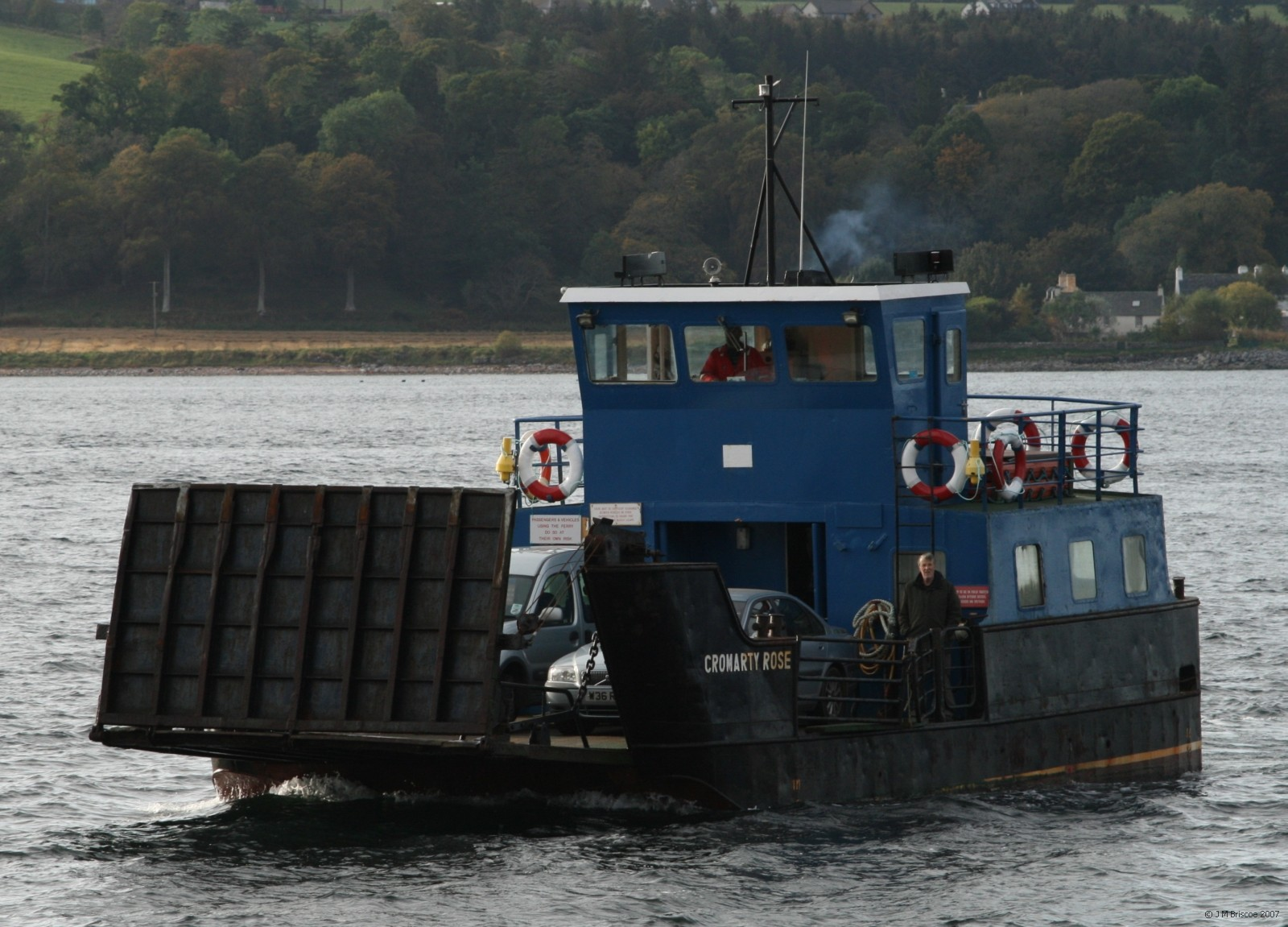
- MV Cromarty Rose arriving at Nigg

History

United Kingdom
- Name: Cromarty Rose
- Owner: Seaboard Marine (Nigg) Ltd; since 2001: Cromarty Ferry Company
- Route: 1987-2009 summers: Nigg - Cromarty
- Builder: MacCrindle Shipbuilding Ltd, Ardrossan; Engines: Ford/Lansing Marine, Dagenham
- Yard number: 439
- Launched: 1986
- Identification: MMSI 235076973
- Status: in service

General characteristics
- Class & type: ro-ro vehicle ferry
- Tonnage: 28 GT; 11 NT
- Length: 43 ft (13 m)
- Beam: 19.7 ft (6.0 m)
- Decks: 1
- Ramps: bow
- Installed power: Twin diesels 2 × M6cy 254bhp
- Propulsion: 2scr
- Speed: 8.5 knots (15.7 km/h; 9.8 mph)
- Capacity: 50 passengers; 2 cars
- Crew: 2

MV Cromarty Rose was the vehicle ferry serving the Nigg-Cromarty route across the Cromarty Firth, providing a summer only service from 1987 to 2009.

== History ==
MV Cromarty Rose was one of the smallest car ferries in the UK, and the only ferry serving the Black Isle, crossing the Cromarty Firth between Nigg and Cromarty. She is a 50-passenger, 2 car vessel built in 1987 in Ardrossan, Scotland for Seaboard Marine (Nigg) Ltd who operated the Cromarty-Nigg service until 2001. After a tendering process, the contract passed to the Cromarty Ferry Company, who purchased the Cromarty Rose from her previous owners.

== Service ==
Built for the Cromarty service, Cromarty Rose operated there from 1987 to 2009. Evening cruises were available for parties of between 10 and 50.

Cromarty Rose became the world's smallest drive-in floating cinema in November 2008, with a showing of The Maggie, to launch the Cromarty Film Festival.

In February 2010, Southampton Marine Services announced that they had won a £500,000 contract to build a new ferry for the Cromarty-Nigg service. and Cromarty Rose sailed from Cromarty on 16 February 2010, bound for the Bristol Channel, to run a service to the island of Steep Holm and Flat Holm . She was renamed Westward Ho by her current owner. She is operated by MW Marine.

The replacement vessel, Cromarty Queen, arrived in Cromarty on 10 October 2010, and commenced the summer service in 2011.
