= Nigg, Highland =

Village and parish in Scotland

Coordinates: 57.719°N 4.009°W

Nigg: Scottish Gaelic: An Neag
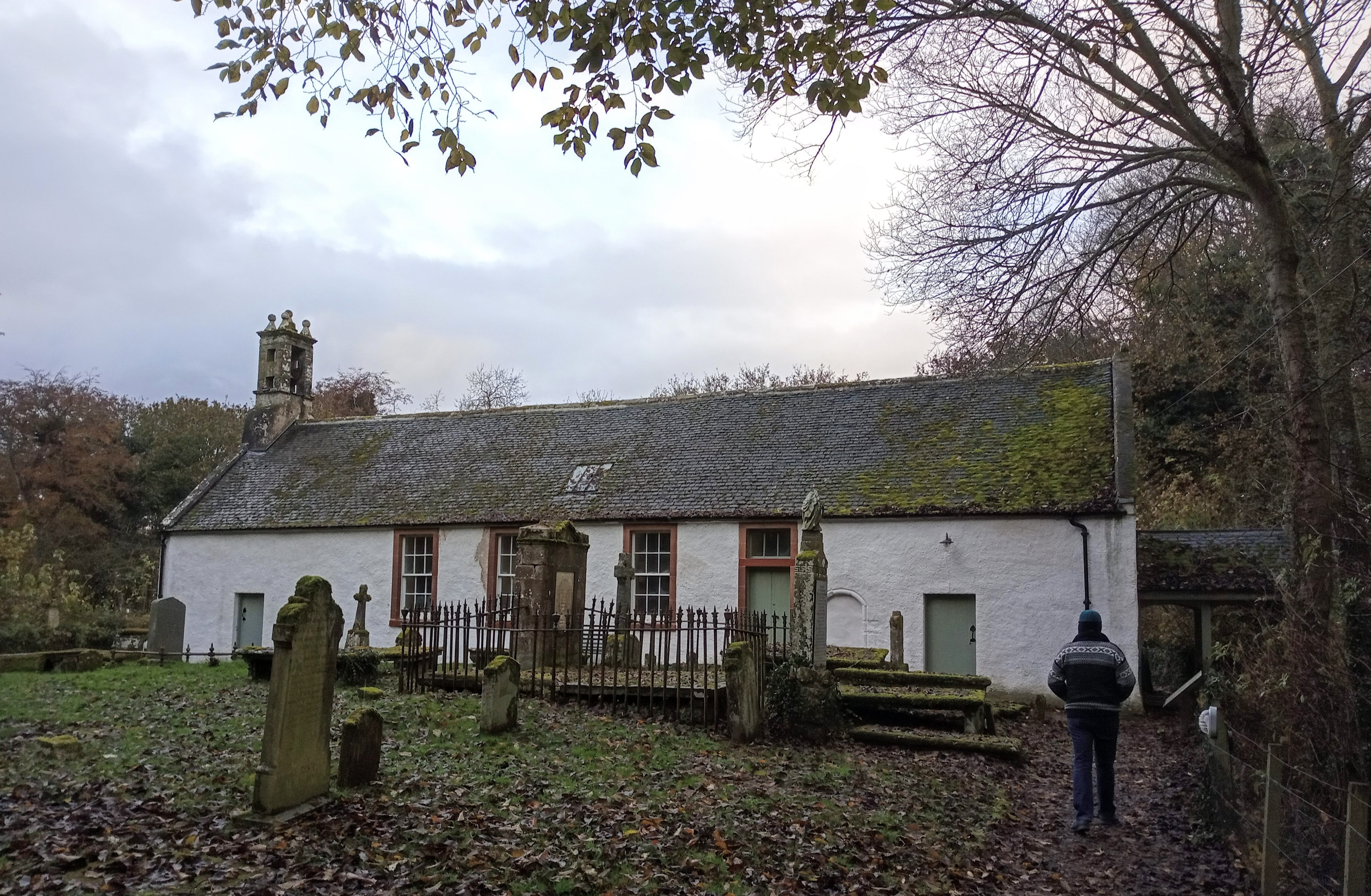
- Nigg Old Church and churchyard.

- Port of Nigg viewed from above the Cromarty Firth

- Location within the Ross and Cromarty area
- Population: 156
- OS grid reference: NH815708
- Council area: Highland
- Lieutenancy area: Ross and Cromarty
- Country: Scotland
- Sovereign state: United Kingdom
- Post town: Tain
- Postcode district: IV19 1
- Dialling code: 01862
- Police: Scotland
- Fire: Scottish
- Ambulance: Scottish
- UK Parliament: Caithness, Sutherland and Easter Ross (UK Parliament constituency)
- Scottish Parliament: Caithness, Sutherland and Ross (Scottish Parliament constituency)

Nigg (from the Scottish Gaelic: An Neag meaning "the notch", referring to a feature of the hills above the parish church), is a village and parish in Easter Ross, administered by the Highland Council. It lies on the north shore of the entrance to the Cromarty Firth.

The Cromarty Firth has long served as a deep-water harbour. A marine fabrication yard at Nigg, originally established for North Sea oil and gas operations, is now used for renewable energy projects.

== Nigg Old Church ==
The parish church is an 18th-century building on an early Christian site dating back to the 8th century. The Nigg Stone, one of the most elaborate stone monuments of early medieval western Europe, is preserved in a room at the west end of the church. This late 8th-century Pictish cross-slab formerly stood in the churchyard but was moved indoors for preservation in recent years.

The nearby manse is one of the oldest to survive in Scotland, dating back to the first half of the 17th century. It is now privately owned and no longer used as the parish minister's residence.

Nigg Old has odd and curious features. In the churchyard is the Cholera Stone, dating from the cholera epidemic of 1832. One of the elders, on coming out of the church, saw a cloud of vapour hovering above the ground. He believed it to be a cloud of cholera, tossed a blanket or cloth over it, and placed this large stone on top to keep it from escaping. According to one tradition, inside the church, the beadle (church officer) allowed an illicit still to be kept in the space under the pulpit.

== Marine fabrication yard ==
Nigg was the site of a crude oil storage and processing depot for oil piped in from the now abandoned Beatrice oil field in the Moray Firth and of a major multi-user energy park including a dry dock operated by Global Energy Group.

Following the oil boom of the 1970s, the oil fabrication yard at Nigg became extremely busy with many of the skilled workers moving from areas such as Glasgow. This resulted in what was called "Glasgow colonies" in towns such as Invergordon and Alness, with many of the families choosing to make the move permanent. This can be seen even now with some of the residents still possessing a Glaswegian accent.

Since the purchase of the fabrication yard by Global Energy Group in 2011 and with investment from the Scottish Government the area has begun to see a new influx of workers to the area again with the yard having plenty of work in the renewable energy sector and also in oil drilling rig refurbishment. In 2012 Global Energy Group set up a skills academy to create new jobs for residents and young people and this has resulted in a fall in unemployment in the area and a welcome boost to the local economy. In March 2017, Global Energy submitted an application to the Scottish Government requesting the yard be made a private port.

The order which was eventually granted, created Nigg Port and gave Global and Nigg Energy Park increased management powers over the quays, wharves, enclosed dry dock, and adjoining land area at Nigg, the ability to maintain and improve the facility through development rights powers, set reasonable charges for facility users, control goods and hazardous substances and manage the security of the port area. It also gives them the right to board vessels moored alongside the port facility or removes vessels, goods, and vehicles within Nigg Port's boundaries.

In 2021, SSE approved a £110M investment in a wind turbine tower factory at the Port of Nigg. However, as of 2026 progress appears to have stalled.

In May 2023, Japanese multinational Sumitomo Electric Industries announced a £200 million investment in building a new high-voltage subsea cable manufacturing factory in Nigg. Construction began the following year, following the announcement that Sumitomo was the preferred supplier for a new HVDC link to Shetland. The 15 ha facility is within the Inverness and Cromarty Firth Green Freeport, and was officially opened on 19 October 2026. The factory has 58,000 m^{2} of floorspace, cost £350m, and is expected to create 250 jobs directly producing both high-voltage AC and DC subsea cables.

In May 2024, Orbital Marine Power announced Global Energy Group in Nigg as their preferred supplier to manufacture the turbines for Orbital's initial projects in Orkney. Construction was expected to start before the end of the year.

In August 2026, it was announced the Port of Nigg would be used for marshalling components for the Dogger Bank Wind Farm phases B and C.

== Ferry service ==
The Nigg to Cromarty ferry route is often called The King’s Ferry – the route taken by King James IV of Scotland when on pilgrimage to the shrine of St Duthac at Tain, doing so at least 18 times in the years between 1493 and 1513.

It is the only ferry service from the Black Isle. The ferry crosses the entrance to the Cromarty Firth, one of the finest natural harbours in Europe and also an area rich in wildlife and world-famous for its dolphin population.

The current service is operated by the MV Renfrew Rose, one of the smallest car ferries in Britain, carrying up to 16 passengers and two cars. Up until the end of summer 2014, the crossing was provided during the summer by the MV Cromarty Queen. There was no ferry service during 2015.

The former Nigg Ferry Hotel, now a private residence, is located near the ferry pier (at grid reference NH796687).

== Notable persons ==
- William Brydon famous for reportedly being the only member of the British expedition retreat from Kabul in 1842 to reach safety
- James Munro, recipient of the Victoria Cross
- William Chisholm Wilson (1810–1876), founder of The New Zealand Herald (born in Nigg)

== See also ==
- Nigg Bay
- Nigg Stone
