= Renfrew Ferry =

Ferry between Renfrew and Yoker

Coordinates: 55°53′12″N 4°22′52″W

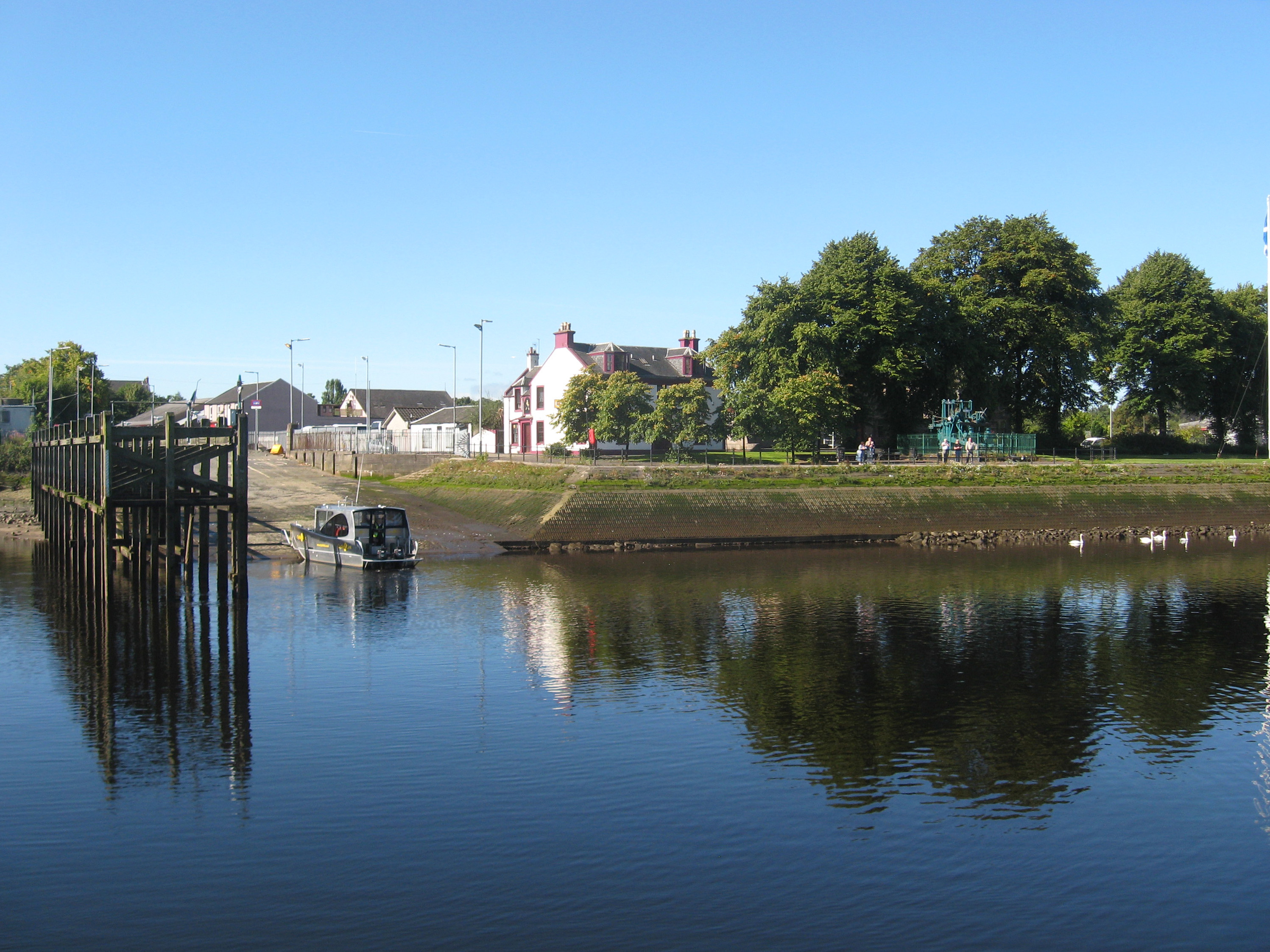
The Renfrew pier and slipway, with the Ferry Inn and the preserved marine engines from the paddle tug Clyde of 1851.

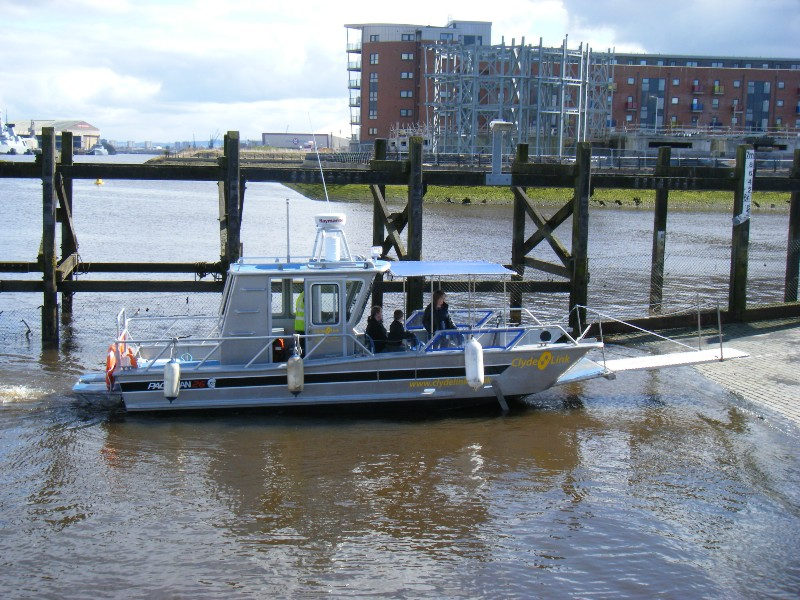
One of the two Clydelink passenger ferries introduced in 2010

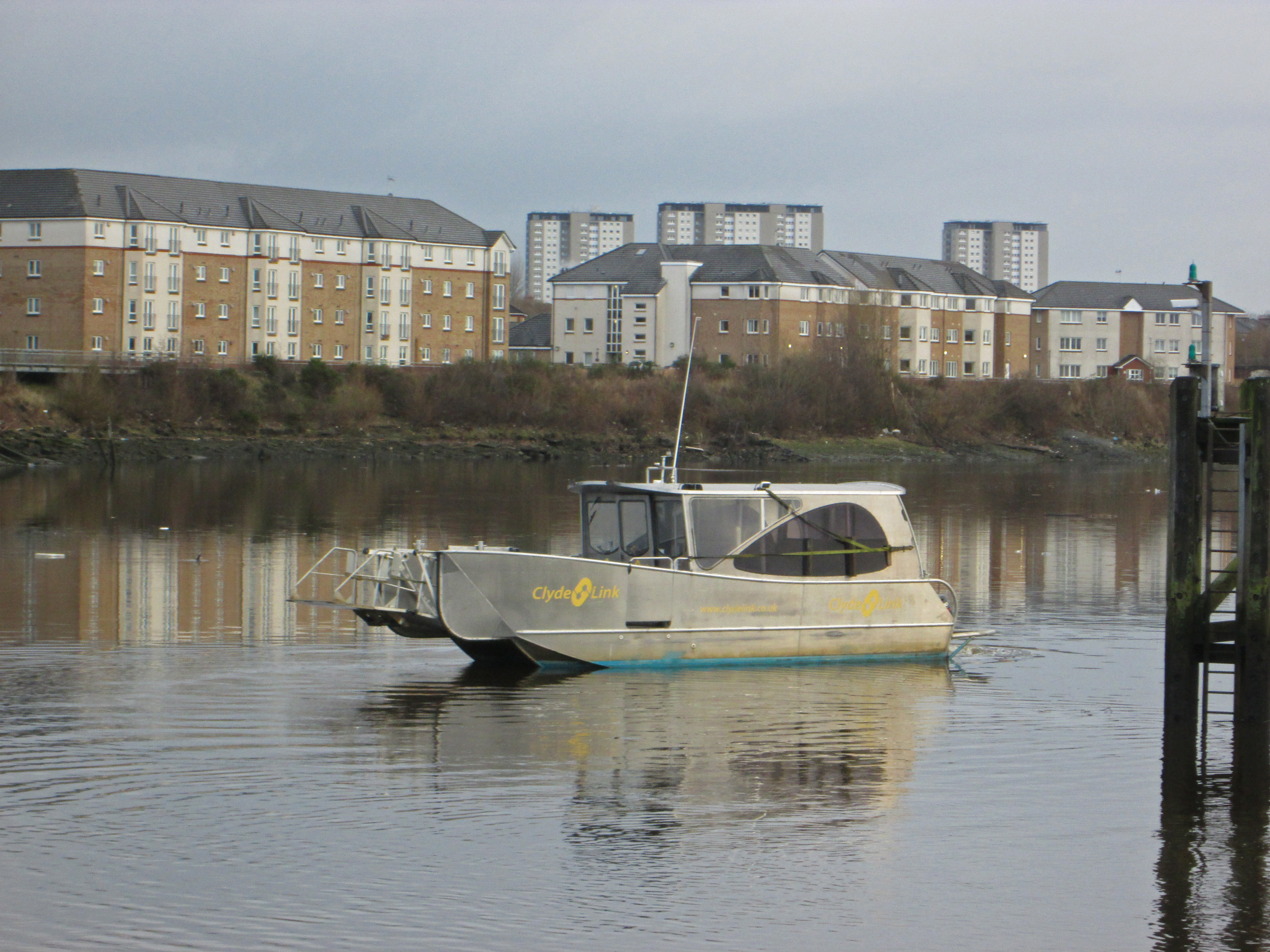
The second Clydelink passenger ferry introduced in 2010

The Renfrew Ferry was a passenger ferry service linking the north and south banks of the River Clyde in Scotland. The service was last operated by Clydelink without subsidy, crossing between Renfrew and Yoker. The service ceased operations on 31 May 2025.

== History ==
Originally the service operated from King's Inch, further upstream on land which is now the site of the Braehead Shopping Centre, but moved around two hundred years ago to better serve the town of Renfrew. In the 1960s there were many other crossings operating close to the Renfrew Ferry, mainly serving the dominant shipyards of the Clyde. The Erskine, Whiteinch, Partick, Govan and Finnieston ferries have all stopped providing the services as bridges and tunnels have also replaced them. It was the last operational Clyde crossing this far upstream, and the closest to Glasgow City Centre.

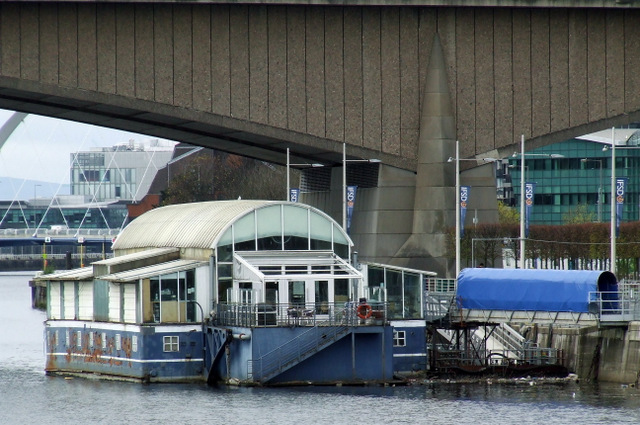
Former renfrew ferry

The service was passenger-only until the car boom of the 1950s and 1960s, when it became a car ferry. With the opening of the Clyde Tunnel just two miles upstream, which allowed faster crossings, the car service ceased in May 1984. Now, due to expanding car use, the tunnel and surrounding routes are themselves frequently congested. One of the old car ferries can still be seen moored on the Broomielaw, in the city centre of Glasgow, where it is a popular entertainment and nightspot, also called the Renfrew Ferry.

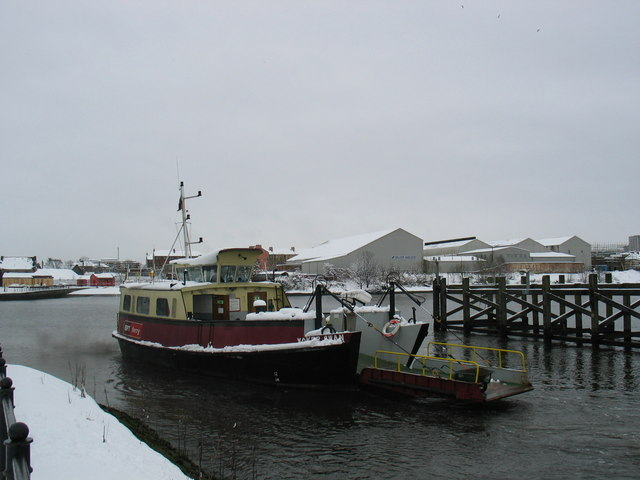
Yoker Swan

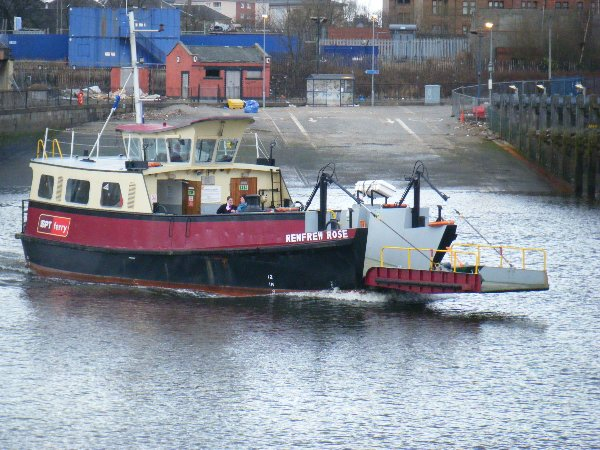
Renfrew Rose mid-river

From 1984 until 2010 Strathclyde Partnership for Transport (SPT) and its predecessor operated two passenger-only boats, appropriately named the MV Renfrew Rose and Yoker Swan. In 2007, a study was started to see the feasibility of replacing the ferry with a bridge, which would allow 24-hour crossings. It would be necessary for the bridge to have a large clearance or be able to open, due to shipbuilding and other river navigation upstream on the River Clyde. The study found that a replacement bridge would cost around fifteen million pounds.

The Strathclyde Partnership for Transport service ended at the end of March 2010, as part of moves to save £2.5M from their budget. The ferry was making an annual loss of £430,000 and SPT was providing a £3 subsidy for every £1.20 fare paid by passengers. Trials took place to ensure a seamless transition to a private sector service without subsidy. Five contenders included Scottish bus company Stagecoach Group, with an amphibious bus and Inverness-based Clyde River Taxis. The successful company was Argyll-based Silvers Marine, operating as Clydelink, with a small, fast ferry. They inaugurated their service using a William E. Munson Company aluminium vessel, capable of carrying 12 passengers.

The Renfrew Ferry figured prominently in the trial of Peter Manuel, with the ferryman as a key witness.

On 9 May 2025, the new Renfrew Bridge opened between Renfrew and Yoker with ferry services to continue operating as normal.

On 31 May 2025, it was confirmed that the ferry would cease operation effective immediately, due to the bridge opening making passenger numbers unviable to continue operating.

Due to damage and the resultant closure of the Renfrew bridge caused by Storm Boelo in October 2026, there have been discussions over a return of the service but as of 31st October 2026 nothing has been confirmed.

== Service ==
The crossing, between the area of Yoker in Glasgow and the town of Renfrew in Renfrewshire, is only 200 metres (220 yd), with graded slipways on each side. The service operated between 6.30 am and 9.30 pm, being on-demand at peak times and half-hourly at other times. The company planned to extend the service to Braehead. The service had reliability issues, with two weeks out of service in 2017 and three weeks in 2018 as of late June. The service was due to continue operating despite the new bridge opening between Renfrew and Yoker. However on May 31st it was confirmed that the ferry would cease operation effective immediately.

== Transport links ==
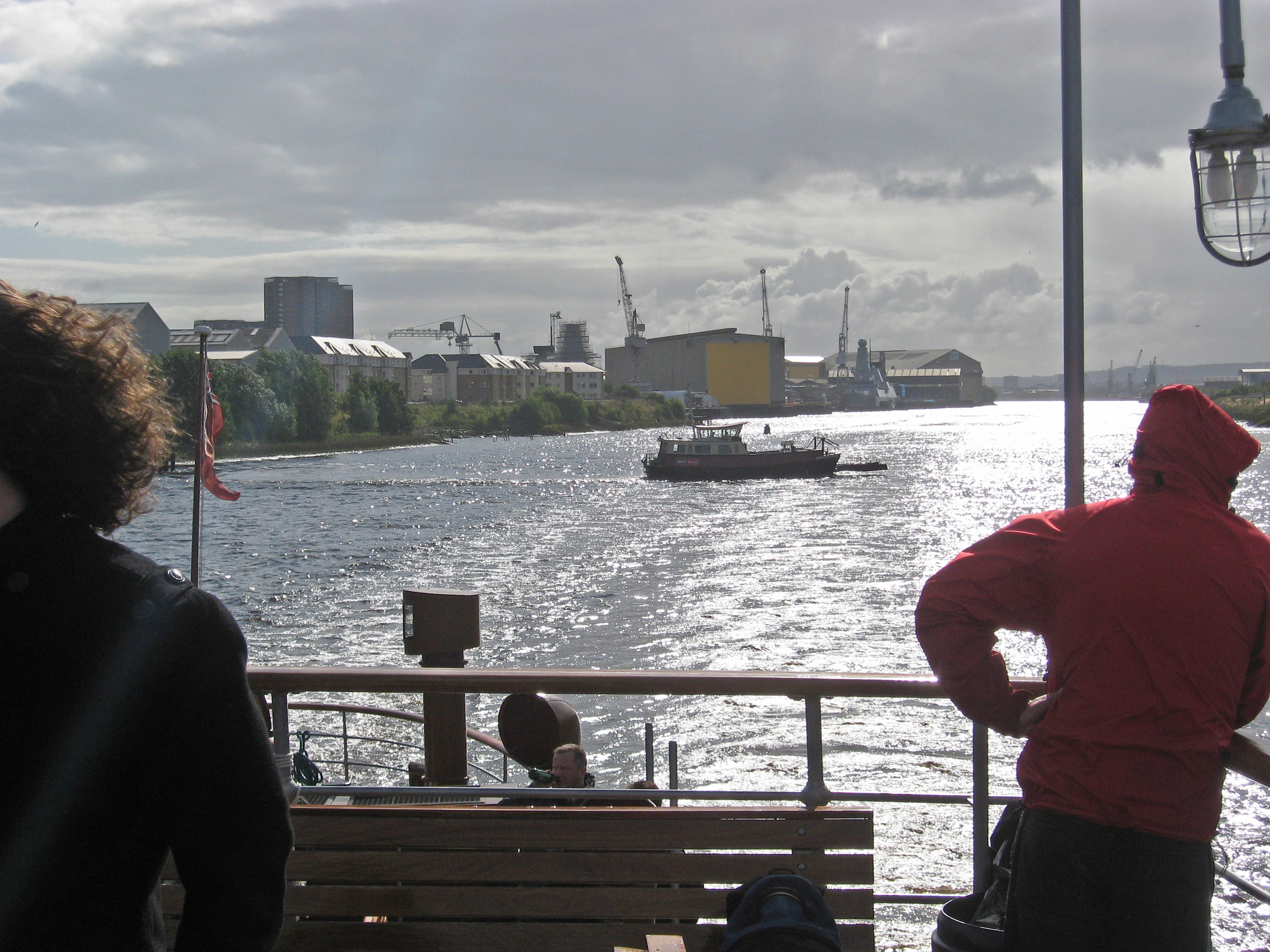
The SPT Renfrew Rose leaving Yoker, seen from PS Waverley in 2009.

The Renfrew Ferry was a dedicated bus terminus on the southern side. In recent years, the opening of Braehead Shopping Centre has seen most services divert via Ferry Village to Braehead Bus Station, and few services now stop at the former ferry slipway, most stopping some 200 m away. Services from FirstGroup and McGills are operated to Paisley, Govan, Renfrew, Glasgow, and Glasgow Airport.

The northern side was located near Dumbarton Road, which is a major bus artery with numerous services. These are operated to destinations such as Helensburgh, Clydebank, Anniesland, Partick and Balloch.

== See also ==
- Renfrew Bridge, new bridge on the River Clyde between Renfrew and Yoker
