= Yoker =

Area of Glasgow, Scotland

Coordinates: 55.888218°N 4.378192°W

Yoker: Scottish Gaelic: An Eochair
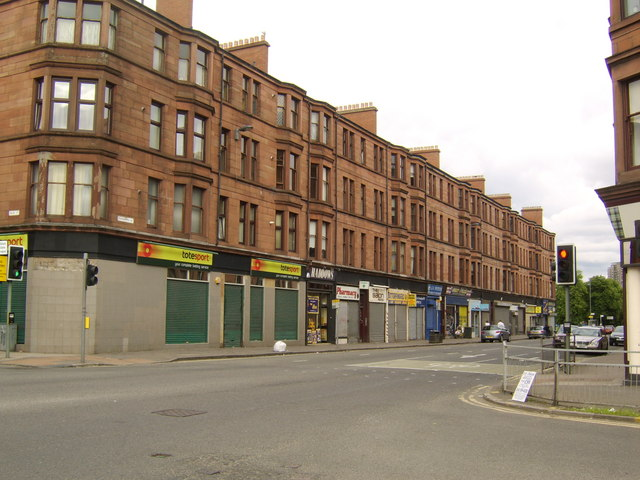
- Shops in Yoker

- Location within Glasgow
- OS grid reference: NS513692
- Council area: Glasgow City Council
- Lieutenancy area: Glasgow
- Country: Scotland
- Sovereign state: United Kingdom
- Post town: GLASGOW
- Postcode district: G14
- Dialling code: 0141
- Police: Scotland
- Fire: Scottish
- Ambulance: Scottish
- UK Parliament: Glasgow North West
- Scottish Parliament: Glasgow Anniesland

Yoker (Scottish Gaelic: An Eochair) is an area of Glasgow, Scotland, located on the northern bank of the Clyde east of Clydebank, 5 miles (8 kilometres) west of the city centre. The name is an Anglicisation of the Scottish Gaelic Eochair meaning a river bank.

== History ==
From the fourteenth century, the Renfrew Ferry has linked Yoker with Renfrew on the south bank of the river. The shipbuilding industry drove the growth of the district in the 19th century; this has since declined, although the nearby Yarrows shipyard, now owned by BAE Systems, is still in operation. Motor vehicles and tramcars were also manufactured in Yoker, which is now an operations centre for the North Clyde Line, part of Glasgow's suburban rail network.

== Transport ==
Yoker railway station has services on the North Clyde and Argyle Lines. Several buses travel along Dumbarton Road, the main thoroughfare between Glasgow and Clydebank which runs parallel to the river. The New River Clyde bridge, a road bridge at the ferry crossing point was constructed in 2024, providing easier access to the retail and leisure facilities at Braehead.

== Notable people ==
In his childhood, Alf Wight lived in the area and attended Yoker Primary School. Alf Wight went on to become a world famous veterinary surgeon, better known by his pen name, James Herriot.

== In popular culture ==
The TV comedy series Limmy's Show featured a sketch in which perpetually stoned Dee Dee Durie travelled to Yoker on a whim, finding the experience an exciting and terrifying adventure, rather than a mundane bus journey.
