= Joseph Lea Gleave =

British architect

- Born: 5 August 1907
- Died: 16 January 1965 (aged 57)
- Occupation: Architect
- Practice: Associated architectural firm[s]
- Buildings: Columbus Lighthouse, Vale of Leven Hospital
- Projects: Glasgow Prestwick Airport

Joseph Lea Gleave (5 August 1907 – 16 January 1965) was a British architect. In 1931, when he was 23, he won the international architectural competition for the Columbus Lighthouse in Santo Domingo Este, Dominican Republic, a memorial monument that was a tribute to Christopher Columbus. Later in his career he became known for the designing of a number of Scottish hospitals.

== Life ==
Gleave was the son of a farmer, James Gleave and his wife Hannah née Lea. Between September 1923 and September 1927 he studied on a part-time basis at Manchester School of Architecture. In 1927 he was apprenticed to James Theodore Halliday in Manchester for several months, before moving to work with Francis Jones as assistant, between 1927 and 1928. In the same year Gleave moved employment again to Thomas Cecil Howitt from 1929 to 1930. From February 1930 to May 1931, he assisted with Jones & Dalrymple in Manchester. The following year, Gleave was appointed to Edinburgh College of Art as a senior assistant. In 1935, he was promoted to director of the School of Architecture at the college.

=== World War II ===
During the war, he was assigned to the Anti-Aircraft Command and reached the rank of lieutenant colonel.

=== After the war ===
After he returned to the department in 1946, he spent a year redesigning the Columbus Memorial and working on Renfrew Airport along with his brother-in-law, the Scottish architect William Kininmonth. In 1948, Gleave became a partner at Keppie Henderson, with the firm being renamed to Keppie Henderson & J L Gleave. Initially focusing on houses and schools, he constructed the new Engineering Building at the University of Glasgow, which lead to additional work, in the construction of hospitals. Between 1951 and 1955, Gleave worked on the development of Vale of Leven Hospital. At the time, his practice was expanding. Known to be eccentric and unpredictable in his approach, with a penchant for late night working, sometimes as late as 4 a.m., his approach led to differences and eventually arguments with the two other partners in the firm, Henderson and Alex Smellie. This led him in early 1958 to establish his own consultancy, known as J L Gleave. Shortly after he worked on commissions for the Queen Mother Hospital in Glasgow and additions to Glasgow Prestwick Airport.

In 1964, he constructed a new science block for the University of Glasgow that was named in honour of Lord John Boyd Orr of Brechin, named as Boyd Orr Building. Orr was a noted biologist and nutritional physiologist, who was rector between 1945 and 1947 and chancellor from 1946 to 1971.

=== Death ===
On 16 January 1965, Gleave died in the Western Infirmary in Glasgow. He has been suffering from cancer for more than a year, but diagnosed in the spring of the year before.

His wife, Margaret Grierson Sutherland survived him. He had two children, a daughter Carolyn, who was an interior designer and a son David. His son David also trained as an architect. He would go on to join his father's old practice in 1987 that changing name as partners came and went and time went on, eventually becoming Young & Gault.

== Gallery ==
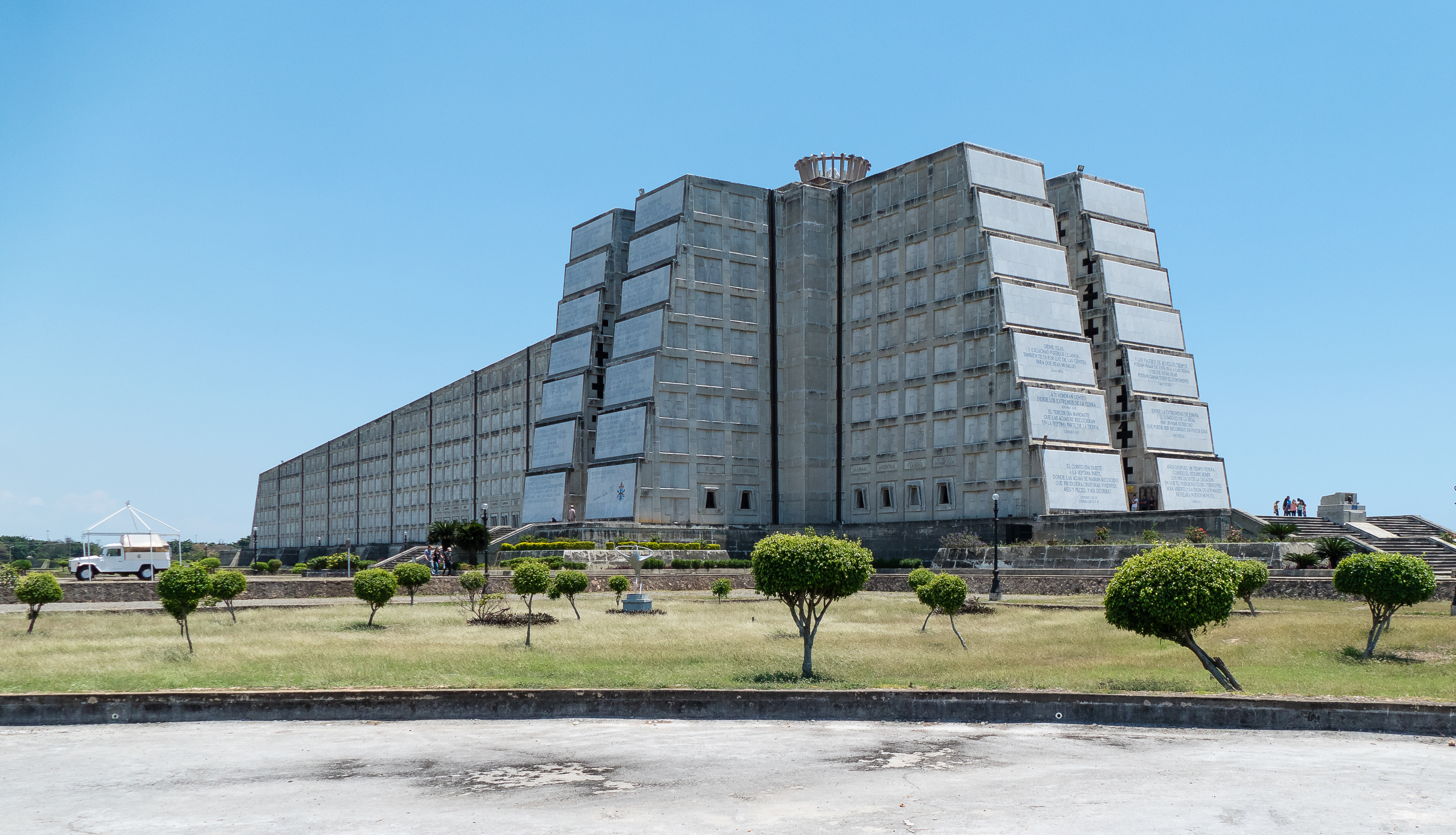
Columbus Lighthouse. Designed by Gleave in 1931 but not completed fully until 1992.

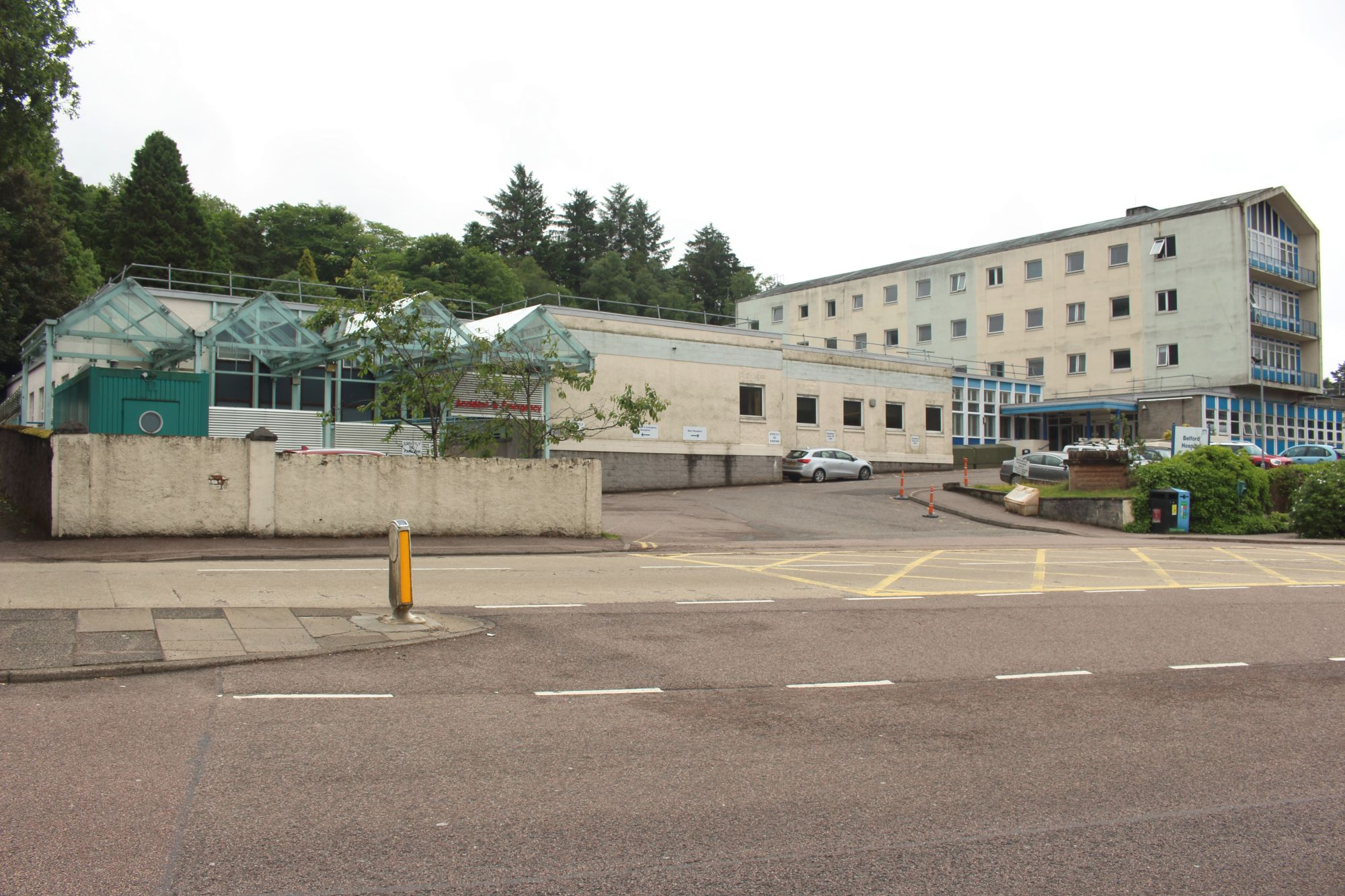
Bedford Hospital, Fort William. After 1949

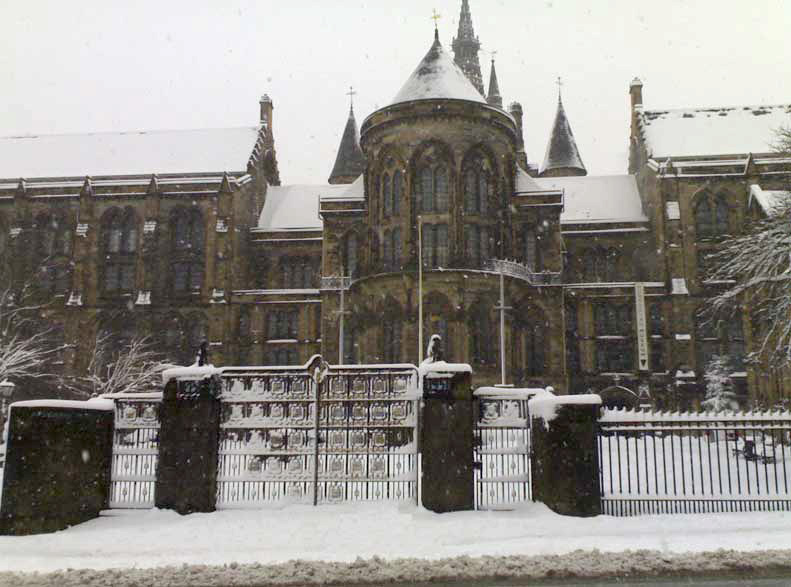
University of Glasgow, Quincentenary Memorial Gates. Circa 1950

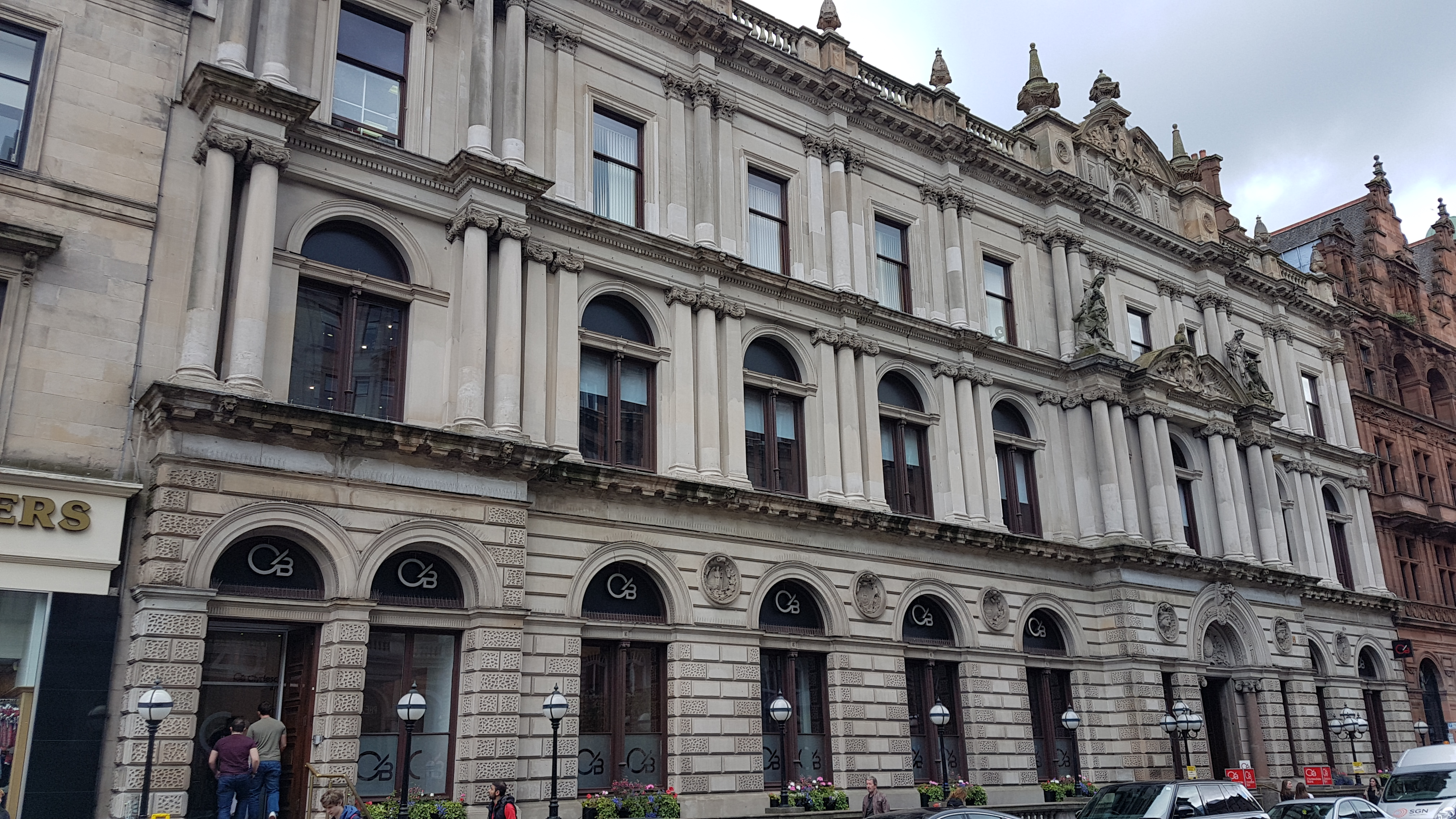
Clydesdale Bank Headquarters, Glasgow. Circa 1951. Alterations.

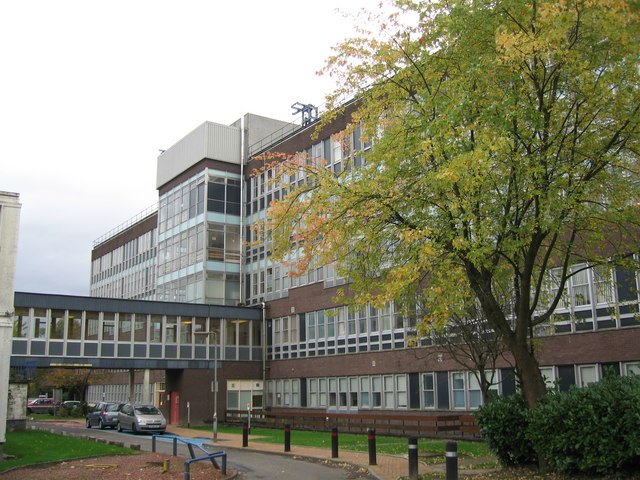
Vale of Leven Hospital in Alexandria. Circa 1951
