= Alexandria railway station (Scotland) =

Railway station in West Dunbartonshire, Scotland

Alexandria
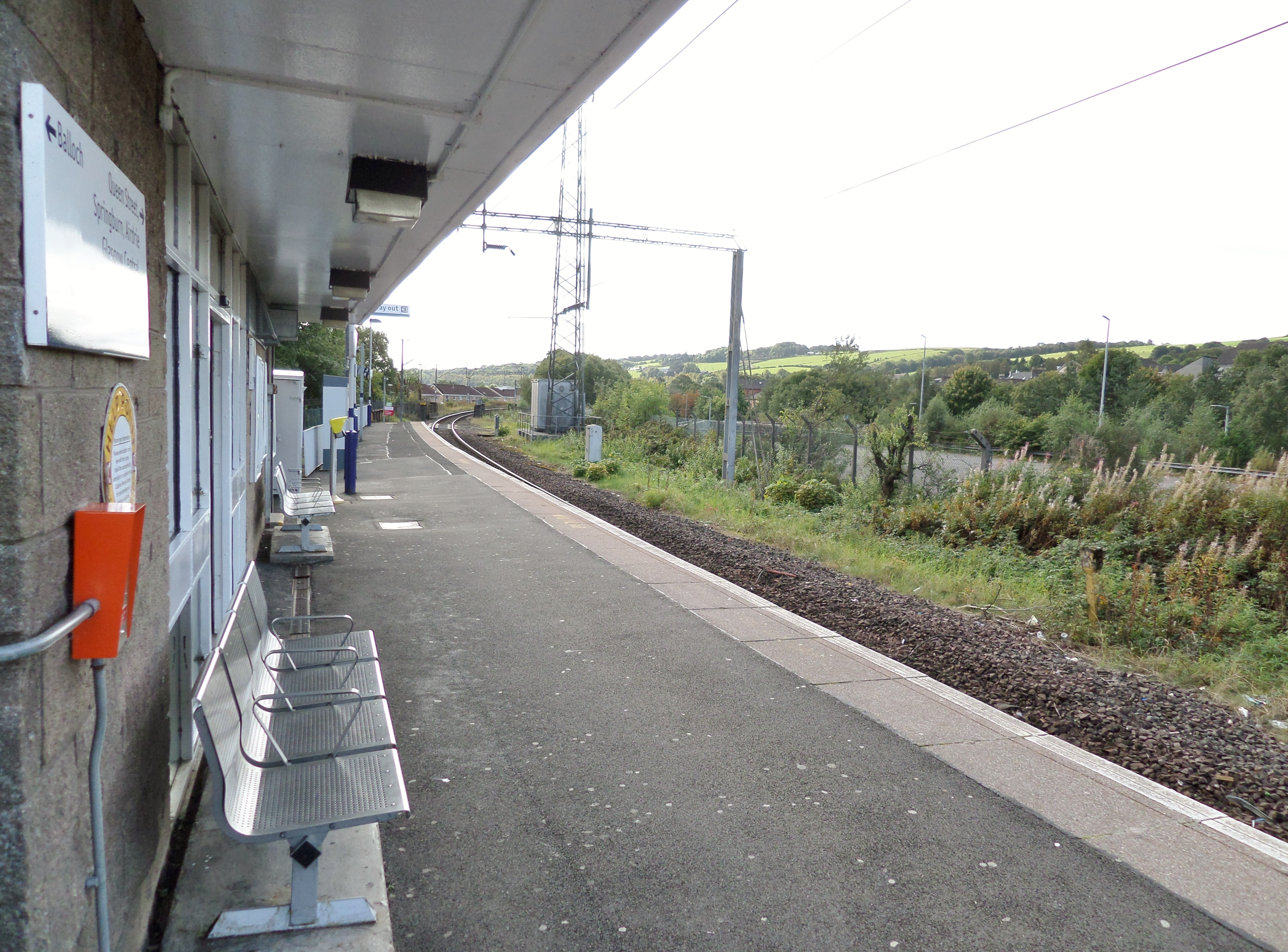
- View south towards Renton

General information
- Location: Alexandria, West Dunbartonshire; Scotland
- Coordinates: 55.9853°N 4.5773°W
- Grid reference: NS393799
- Manager: ScotRail
- Transit authority: SPT
- Platforms: 1

Other information
- Station code: ALX

History
- Original company: Caledonian and Dunbartonshire Junction Railway
- Pre-grouping: Caledonian Railway and North British Railway
- Post-grouping: LMSR and LNER

Key dates
- 15 July 1850: Station opened
- January 1935: Renamed Alexandria and Bonhill
- 1962: Renamed Alexandria

Passengers
- 2021/22: ▲0.111 million
- 2022/23: ▲0.148 million
- 2023/24: ▲0.177 million
- 2024/25: ▲0.186 million
- 2025/26: ▲0.187 million
Location
Notes
- Passenger statistics from the Office of Rail and Road

Alexandria railway station serves the town of Alexandria, Scotland. The station is managed by ScotRail and is served by their trains on the North Clyde Line. It is sited 19 miles 20 chains (31 km) northwest of Glasgow Queen Street, measured via Singer and Maryhill, and is situated between Renton and Balloch.

== History ==
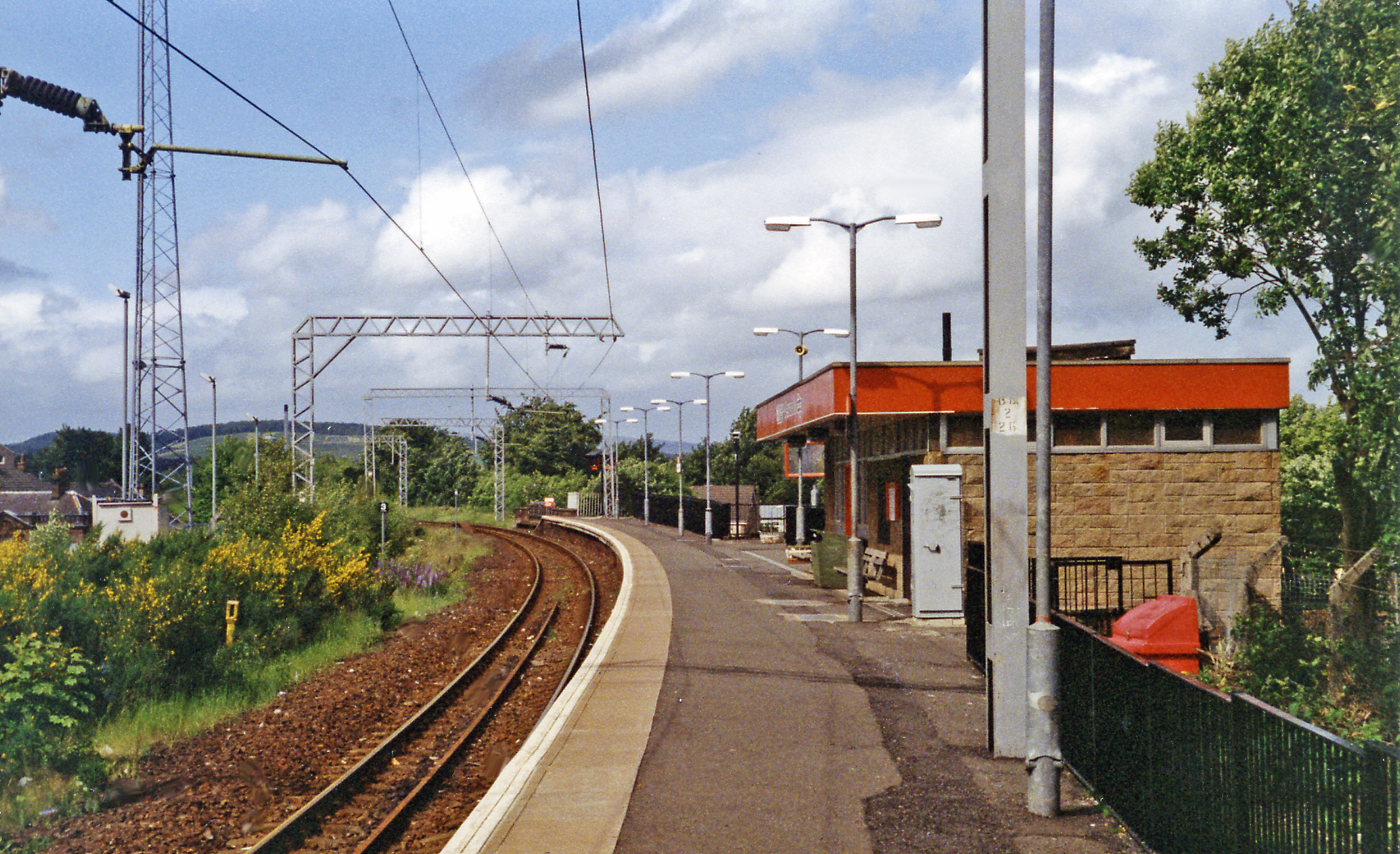
Looking north towards Balloch in 1994

Opened by the Caledonian and Dunbartonshire Junction Railway on 15 July 1850, it became part of a joint London, Midland and Scottish Railway and London and North Eastern Railway line during the Grouping of 1923. The line then passed on to the Scottish Region of British Railways on nationalisation in 1948. The line through the station was double until 1973, but now only one track and platform are in use.

In 2018, it was reported locally that new signage, showing the way to the Vale of Leven Hospital, had been installed at the station and at Balloch.

== Facilities ==
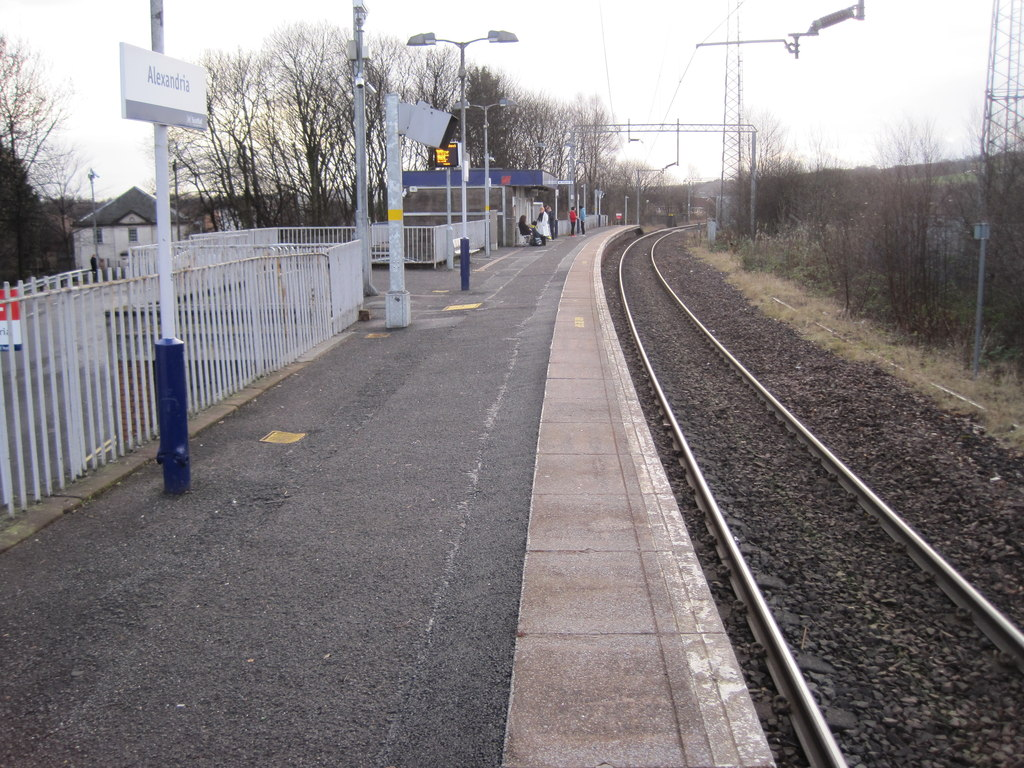
Looking south from the station, in 2012

Unlike Renton, the only other intermediate station on the Balloch line, Alexandria does have a ticket office and a car park. It also has a help point, bench and bike racks located on the platform, plus a payphone in the ticket office. Although the ticket office entrance from the car park is not step-free, there is step-free access to the platform (and from the platform to the ticket office).

== Passenger volume ==
The main origin or destination station for journeys to or from Alexandria in the 2022–23 period was Glasgow Queen Street, making up 41,932 of the 148,340 journeys (28.3%).

Passenger volume at Alexandria
	2002–03	2004–05	2005–06	2006–07	2007–08	2008–09	2009–10	2010–11	2011–12	2012–13	2013–14	2014–15	2015–16	2016–17	2017–18	2018–19	2019–20	2020–21	2021–22	2022–23
Entries and exits	270,904	276,238	305,459	294,563	298,266	333,302	343,238	346,556	348,418	357,744	347,056	359,874	344,530	307,348	278,932	244,378	233,278	26,080	111,434	148,340

The statistics cover twelve month periods that start in April.

== Services ==
The typical off-peak service in trains per hour Mondays to Saturdays is:

- 2 tph to Airdrie via Singer and Glasgow Queen Street
- 2 tph to Balloch

The typical service on Sundays is:

- 1 tph to Motherwell via Yoker, Glasgow Central and Whifflet
- 1 tph to Larkhall via Yoker, Glasgow Central and Hamilton Central
- 2 tph to Balloch

.

Preceding station	National Rail	Following station
Renton	ScotRail; North Clyde Line	Balloch
	Historical railways	
Renton	CR & NBR; Caledonian and Dunbartonshire Junction Railway	Balloch Central

== Bibliography ==
- Butt, R. V. J. (October 1995). The Directory of Railway Stations: details every public and private passenger station, halt, platform and stopping place, past and present (1st ed.). Sparkford: Patrick Stephens Ltd. ISBN 978-1-85260-508-7. OCLC 60251199. OL 11956311M.
- Jowett, Alan (2000). Jowett's Nationalised Railway Atlas (1st ed.). Penryn, Cornwall: Atlantic Transport Publishers. ISBN 978-0-906899-99-1. OCLC 228266687.
- Jowett, Alan (March 1989). Jowett's Railway Atlas of Great Britain and Ireland: From Pre-Grouping to the Present Day (1st ed.). Sparkford: Patrick Stephens Ltd. ISBN 978-1-85260-086-0. OCLC 22311137.
