= Argyll aircraft engine =

1914 prototype Burt-McCollum sleeve valve aircraft engine

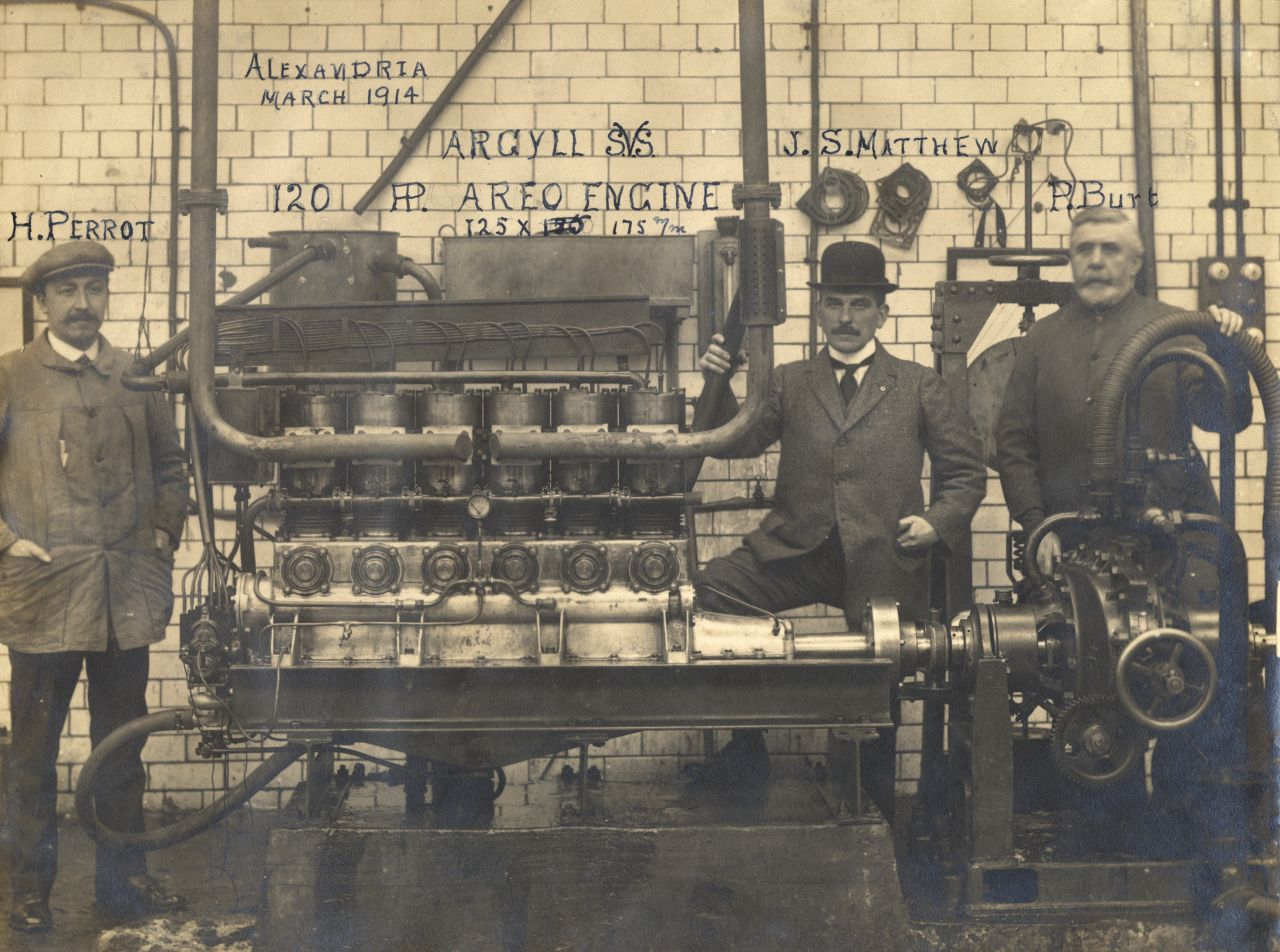
- An Argyll aircraft engine on the test stand at the firms factory in Alexandria near Glasgow, Scotland
- Type: Water-cooled straight-six Burt-McCollum single sleeve valve aircraft engine
- National origin: United Kingdom
- Manufacturer: Argylls Ltd
- First run: 1914
- Major applications: Prototypes only
- Number built: 2

The Argyll aircraft engine was the first four stroke sleeve valve engine built for aircraft use. Manufactured by the Scottish car maker Argylls in 1914, the engine was a 120 hp straight-six design utilising Burt-McCollum single sleeve valves which eliminated the need for poppet valves. The Argyll aircraft engine was exhibited to the British War Office in 1914 but was not put into production.

Development of Burt-McCollum single sleeve valves continued after World War I with the type eventually seeing widespread use in British aero engines starting with the Bristol Perseus in 1932.

== Design and development ==
In 1909 the Scottish engineer Peter Burt patented a single sleeve valve design. In the same year a Canadian engineer, James McCollum, patented a similar single sleeve valve design. Arrangements were made between Peter Burt, James McCollum and Argylls Ltd which lead to the valve design being referred to as the Burt-McCollum. Argylls used the Burt-McCollum design in a series of luxury automobiles between 1911 and 1914.

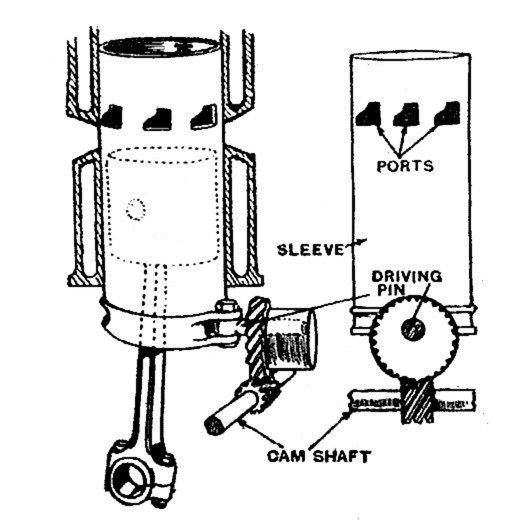
The Burt-McCollum single sleeve-valve mechanism used in Argyll engines

The Burt-McCollum design used a single sleeve geared to produce both rotary and reciprocating motion. The design eliminated the dual sleeve found in the earlier Knight engine design, which had been found unreliable in operation due to lubrication problems. The movement of the sleeve uncovered ports for inlet and exhaust allowing the engine to operate in a four-stroke cycle without conventional valves. Contemporary engine valves were relatively failure prone so their elimination offered the potential for a big improvement in reliability as well as low vibration for smoother running.

In 1913 the British War Office announced a contest for aircraft engines with the selection taking place in 1914 at Farnborough. Argylls submitted two water-cooled six-cylinder inline engines using their signature Burt-McCollum sleeve valves. The engines featured an aluminum crankcase with welded steel cooling water jackets and steel pistons. Two spark plugs were fitted to each cylinder fired by one Bosch magneto.

During the competition, the Argyll aircraft engines experienced several mechanical breakdowns. Despite this, one of the engines successfully completed a six-hour run test at full load, earning a £100 prize. The engine received positive feedback for its low vibration and high fuel efficiency; however, it was considered relatively heavy for its power output.. Although it was not selected for production, the Royal Aircraft Factory expressed interest in the design and later built a prototype Burt-McCollum sleeve-valve version of an existing V12 engine.

== Further development ==
In June 1914, Argylls went into receivership at which point the single sleeve valve patents reverted to Peter Burt. In 1918 the patents were bought outright by Wallace Ltd of Glasgow, who licensed the designs to other manufacturers, including Barr and Stroud who produced a line of Burt-McCollum sleeve valve engines for motorcycles.

In 1926, Continental Motors purchased the exclusive worldwide rights to manufacture and license Burt-McCollum sleeve valves. Discussions were held between Continental and Antony Fokker resulting in a radial Burt-McCollum sleeve valve engine which was exhibited at trade shows in 1927. The engine was not put into production.

After WW1, designers in the United Kingdom continued the development of Burt-McCollum sleeve valve aero-engines. Harry Ricardo pursued the development of sleeve valve engines as these allowed cooling water jackets to be extended to cover cylinder heads allowing for better and more even cooling which resulted in a lower risk of detonation allowing for higher cylinder compression ratios. Roy Fedden cited quieter operation, higher compression ratios, low maintenance and the complete enclosure of all working parts as inherent advantages of the sleeve valve engine over the poppet valve type.

The first sleeve valve aircraft engine to go into production was Roy Fedden's Bristol Perseus in 1932. Development continued in the UK with both D. Napier & Son and the Bristol Aeroplane Company producing Burt-McCollum sleeve valve engines well into the 1950s.

== Specifications ==
Data from Angle & Wells

=== General characteristics ===
- Type: Inline six-cylinder piston engine
- Bore: 4.92 in (125 mm)
- Stroke: 6.89 in (175 mm)
- Displacement: 785.94 cu in (12.9 L)
- Dry weight: 600 lb (272 kg) - Including radiator
- Designer: Henri Perrot

=== Components ===
- Valvetrain: Burt-McCollum single sleeve valves
- Fuel system: Twin Zenith carburettors
- Fuel type: Petrol
- Oil system: Wet sump
- Cooling system: Water-cooled
- Reduction gear: Direct-drive
- Bearings: White metal journals

=== Performance ===
- Power output: 120 hp (89 kW) at 1200 rpm (rated). 130 hp (97 kW) at 1300 rpm (achieved in testing).
- Specific fuel consumption: 0.47 lb/(hp⋅h) (0.286 kg/kWh)
- Power-to-weight ratio: 0.22 hp/lb (0.36 kW/kg)
