= Argyll Motor Works =

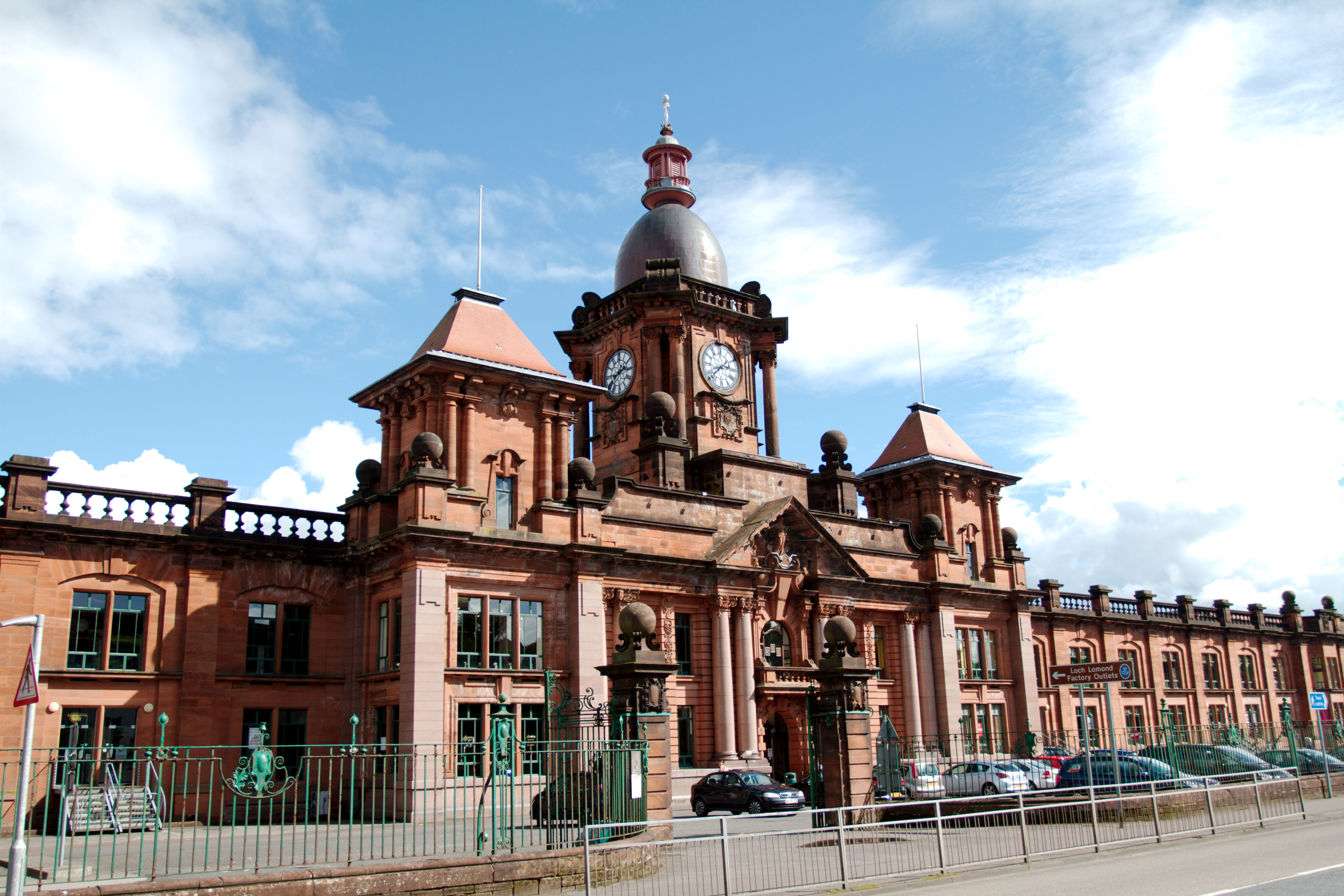
- Argyll Motor Works on North Main Street

- Location in West Dunbartonshire
- 55.9919°N 4.5838°W

Listed Building – Category A
- Designated: 14 May 1971
- Reference no.: LB127

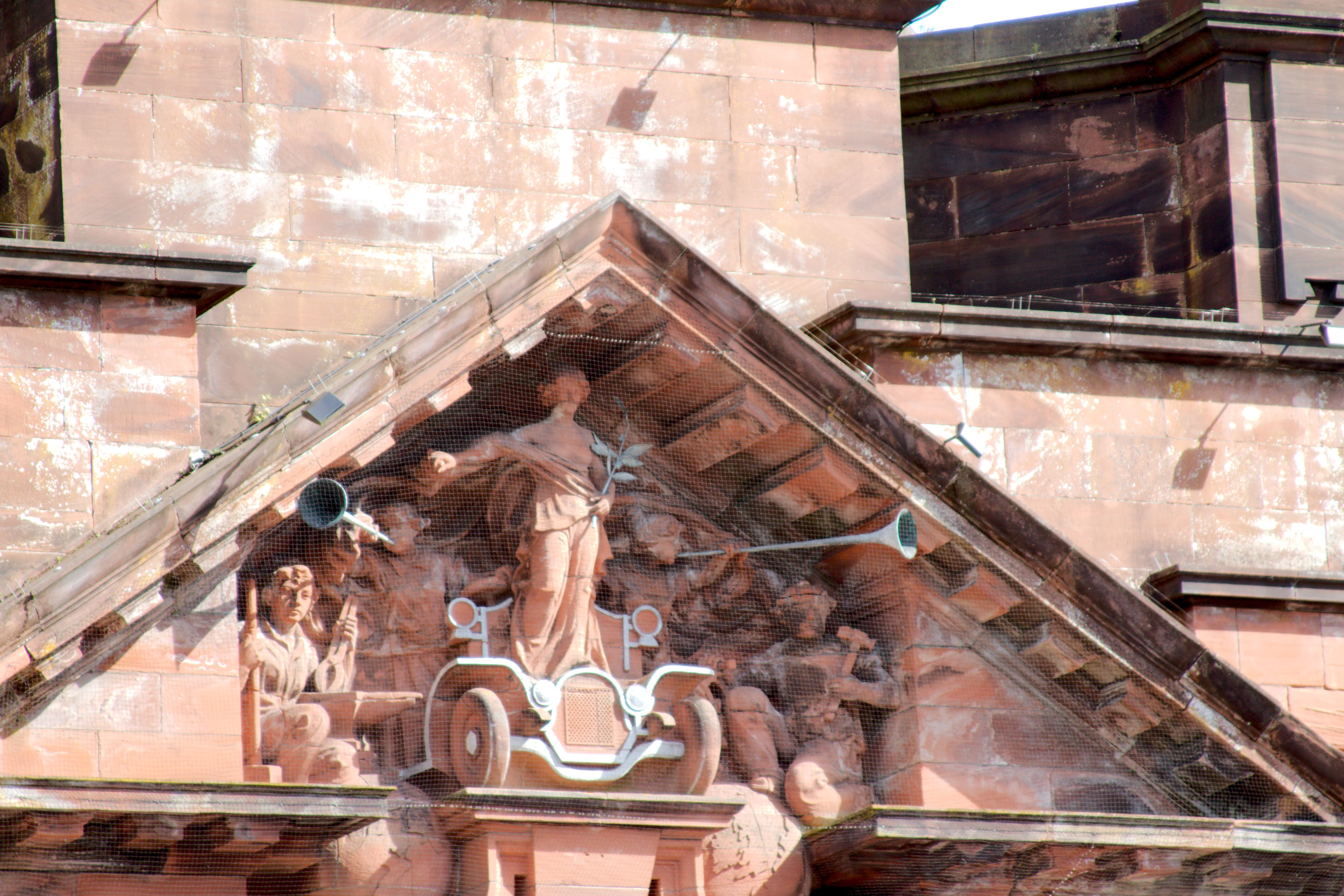
Detail of the facade of the Argyll Motor works

The Argyll Motor Works, currently known as Lomond Galleries, is a former car factory in Alexandria, West Dunbartonshire, Scotland. It was opened in 1906 by Argyll Motors Ltd, at the time the largest producer of cars in Scotland. After the Argyll company folded it was used as a torpedo factory, subsequently lying empty for many years, and is now a shopping centre. The elaborate structure is protected as a category A listed building.

== History ==
Argyll Motors Ltd was established in Bridgeton, Glasgow, in 1899 as the Hozier Engineering Company. By 1905, the company was expanding production rapidly, and a new site at Alexandria, outside the city, was identified. Plans were drawn up by architect Charles James Halley, and the building was officially opened by John Douglas-Scott-Montagu, 2nd Baron Montagu of Beaulieu, on 26 June 1906. The factory covered 12 acres (4.9 ha), and was served by its own railway line and several streets of houses for the factory workers. The new facility cost over £200,000, and was designed to produce 2,500 cars per year. By 1907, production had passed 800 per year, but a series of technical experiments, and increasing competition, led to the company's decline. The high running costs of the huge factory, and the failure to adopt mass production, may also have contributed to the company's troubles. The final blow came in 1914 following a lawsuit brought by Daimler, which Argyll won, but the costs led to bankruptcy and production ceased.

The works, and its employees, were taken over by the Admiralty as a munitions factory during the First World War (1914–1919). Afterwards, it was briefly a silk works, but remained empty for most of the interwar period. In 1937, it was repurchased by the Admiralty and reopened as the Royal Naval Torpedo Factory, which operated into the 1950s. In the 1960s, the site is said to have been involved in Chevaline, a secret project to improve Britain's Polaris nuclear warheads.

The facility was closed in 1969, and in 1971, the Argyll Works was purchased by electronics company Plessey. However, their production unit closed within a year, prompting a sit-in protest by staff. Despite various proposals, the factory remained empty for nearly three decades; the factory sheds were demolished, and the substantial red sandstone offices facing North Main Street deteriorated. The future of the building was secured in the 1990s with its renovation as a shopping centre, opened in 1997 by Princess Anne as Loch Lomond Factory Outlets. It now trades as Lomond Galleries.
