= Vale of Leven Hospital =

- NHS Greater Glasgow and Clyde
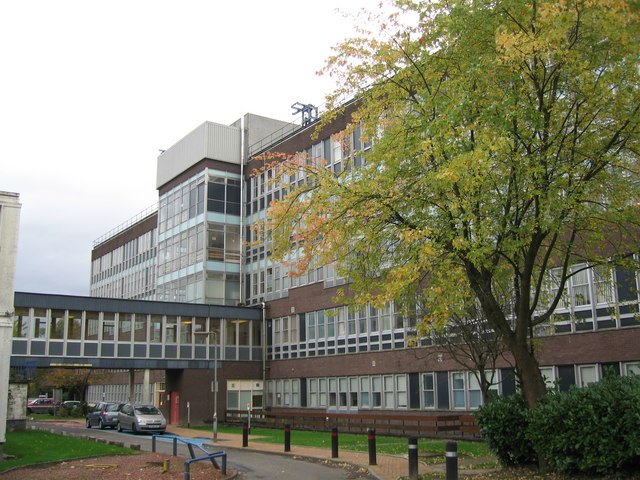
- Vale of Leven Hospital

- Shown in West Dunbartonshire

Geography
- Location: Alexandria, West Dunbartonshire, Scotland
- Coordinates: 55.993030°N 4.590681°W

Organisation
- Care system: NHS Scotland
- Type: District General
- Affiliated university: University of Glasgow; University of the West of Scotland

Services
- Emergency department: No - Minor injuries only
- Beds: 92

Links
- Website: Vale of Leven Hospital
- Lists: Hospitals in Scotland

Vale of Leven District General Hospital or simply the Vale of Leven Hospital is a district general hospital in Alexandria, West Dunbartonshire, Scotland. It is managed by NHS Greater Glasgow and Clyde.

== History ==
The hospital has its origins in the Henry Brock Hospital which opened in a converted private house in 1924. After the Second World War it was decided to commission a purpose-built facility: the new hospital was designed by Keppie Henderson & Joseph Gleave and built on a site adjacent to Henry Brock Cottage Hospital between 1951 and 1955.

== Services ==
The hospital has 92 inpatient beds as well as a Minor Injuries Unit. The hospital has approximately 47 births per year and has full accreditation as baby friendly, since 2006. This is down from 900 births per year in 2002.

== Vale of Leven Hospital Inquiry ==
An Inquiry was set up by Scottish Ministers to investigate the occurrence of C. difficile infection at the hospital from 1 January 2007 onwards. The Inquiry published its final report on 24 November 2014. There was criticism at the delay of the Inquiry five times. The findings of the inquiry were considered by the Academy of Medical Royal Colleges and Faculties in Scotland, when they produced a report in July 2015, entitled “Learning from serious failings in care”. The Inquiry cost £10m for an inquiry which took so long that by the time it reached its conclusions, the problem had already largely been fixed. The health secretary noted that at the time of the outbreak, "there was no effective inspection regime at the time to pick up these failings". The newly-appointed Scottish Health Secretary Shona Robison said "We now have an effective inspection routine through the Healthcare Environment Inspectorate that completes unannounced, comprehensive inspections and demands urgent actions".
