= Dalreoch railway station =

Railway station in West Dunbartonshire, Scotland

Dalreoch Scottish Gaelic: An Dail Riabhach
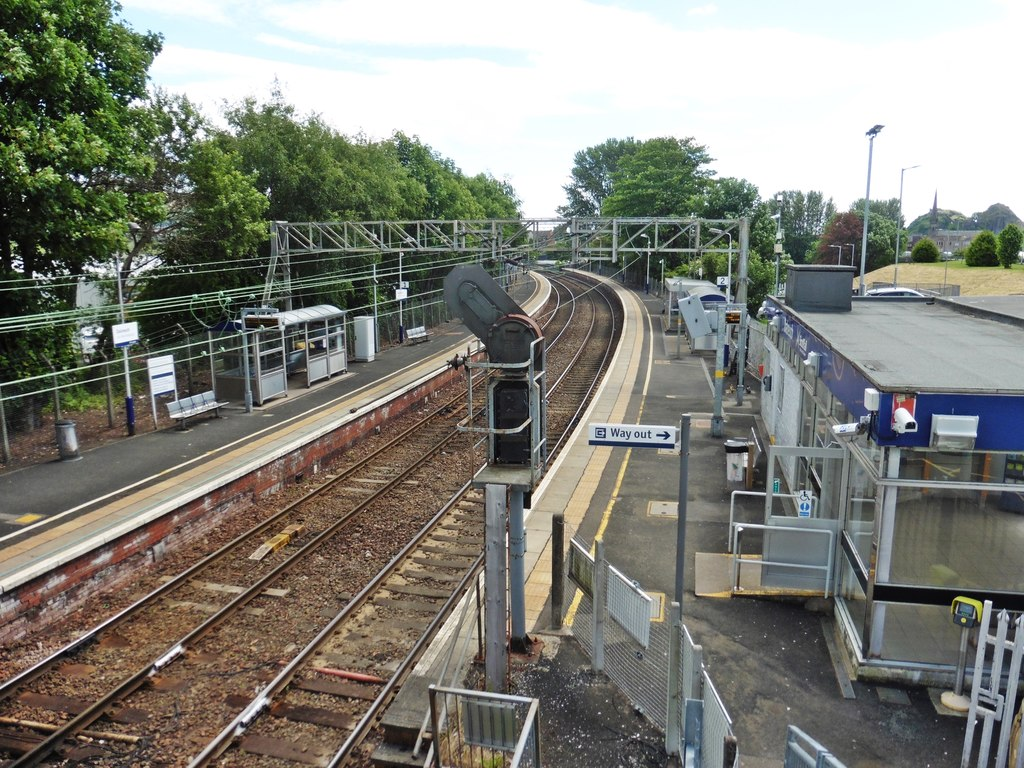

General information
- Location: Dumbarton, West Dunbartonshire; Scotland
- Coordinates: 55.9472°N 4.5770°W
- Grid reference: NS391757
- Manager: ScotRail
- Transit authority: SPT
- Platforms: 2

Other information
- Station code: DLR
- Fare zone: D2

History
- Original company: Caledonian and Dumbartonshire Junction Railway
- Pre-grouping: Dumbarton and Balloch Railway
- Post-grouping: Dumbarton and Balloch Railway

Key dates
- 15 July 1850: Station opened
- 28 May 1858: Helensburgh line opened

Passengers
- 2021/22: ▲0.133 million
- 2022/23: ▲0.180 million
- 2023/24: ▲0.192 million
- 2024/25: ▲0.197 million
- 2025/26: ▲0.200 million
Location
Notes
- Passenger statistics from the Office of Rail and Road

Dalreoch railway station serves the west end of Dumbarton in West Dunbartonshire, Scotland. The station is managed and served by ScotRail and is served by trains on the North Clyde Line. The station is 16 miles 38 chains (26.5 km) northwest of Glasgow Queen Street (High Level), measured via Singer and Maryhill.

== History ==
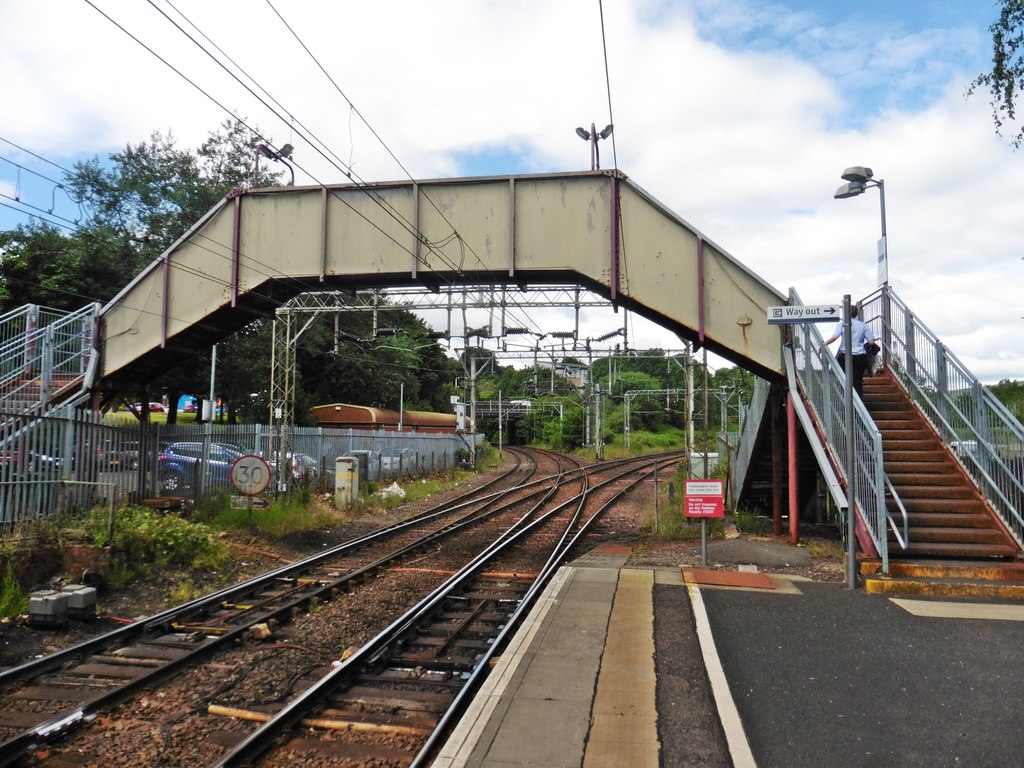
The junction at Dalreoch - the line diverging to the right becomes single track and heads to Balloch. The line to the left runs to Helensburgh Central, or onto the West Highland Line and to Oban, Fort William and Mallaig.

The Caledonian and Dumbartonshire [sic] Junction Railway (C&DJR) was opened in 1850, and Dalreoch railway station opened on 15 July 1850. The station became a junction with the opening of the Glasgow, Dumbarton and Helensburgh Railway (GD&HR) on 28 May 1858. The tunnel at the west end of the station, on the route to Helensburgh, was doubled in 1896 at a cost of £400,000 - the last section of the line to be doubled.

The line was electrified in 1960. Services on the Lanarkshire & Dumbartonshire Railway route to Possil via Dalmuir Riverside ended in October 1964 when it fell victim to the Beeching Axe.

== Facilities ==
The station is equipped with a ticket office on platform 2, the latter adjacent to the car park and bike racks. Both platforms have benches, help points and shelters. The platforms are linked by a footbridge, so only platform 2 has step-free access.

== Passenger volume ==
Passenger Volume at Dalreoch
	2002–03	2004–05	2005–06	2006–07	2007–08	2008–09	2009–10	2010–11	2011–12	2012–13	2013–14	2014–15	2015–16	2016–17	2017–18	2018–19	2019–20	2020–21	2021–22	2022–23
Entries and exits	316,146	303,851	321,643	313,186	318,398	331,162	315,876	337,210	322,230	318,230	391,096	390,800	397,382	364,594	294,780	291,698	278,512	42,802	132,936	179,500

The statistics cover twelve-month periods that start in April.

== Services ==
The typical off-peak service in trains per hour Mondays to Saturdays is:

- 2 tph to Edinburgh Waverley via Glasgow Queen Street (semi-fast)
- 2 tph to Airdrie via Singer and Glasgow Queen Street
- 2 tph to Helensburgh Central
- 2 tph to Balloch

The typical service on Sundays is:

- 2 tph to Edinburgh Waverley via Singer and Glasgow Queen Street
- 1 tph to Motherwell via Yoker, Glasgow Central and Whifflet
- 1 tph to Larkhall via Yoker, Glasgow Central and Hamilton Central
- 2 tph to Helensburgh Central
- 2 tph to Balloch

Preceding station	National Rail	Following station
Dumbarton Central	ScotRail; North Clyde Line	Cardross
Dumbarton Central	ScotRail; North Clyde Line	Renton
	Historical railways	
continuing line	North British Railway; Glasgow, Dumbarton and Helensburgh Railway	Cardross; Line and station open
Dumbarton Central; Line and station open	CR & NBR; Caledonian and Dunbartonshire Junction Railway	Renton; Line and station open

== Bibliography ==
- Brailsford, Martyn, ed. (December 2017) [1987]. Railway Track Diagrams 1: Scotland & Isle of Man (6th ed.). Frome: Trackmaps. ISBN 978-0-9549866-9-8.
- Butt, R. V. J. (October 1995). The Directory of Railway Stations: details every public and private passenger station, halt, platform and stopping place, past and present (1st ed.). Sparkford: Patrick Stephens Ltd. ISBN 978-1-85260-508-7. OCLC 60251199. OL 11956311M.
- Casserley, H. C. (1968). Britain's Joint Lines. London: Ian Allan. ISBN 0-7110-0024-7.
- Jowett, Alan (March 1989). Jowett's Railway Atlas of Great Britain and Ireland: From Pre-Grouping to the Present Day (1st ed.). Sparkford: Patrick Stephens Ltd. ISBN 978-1-85260-086-0. OCLC 22311137.
