= Renton railway station =

Railway station in West Dunbartonshire, Scotland

Renton
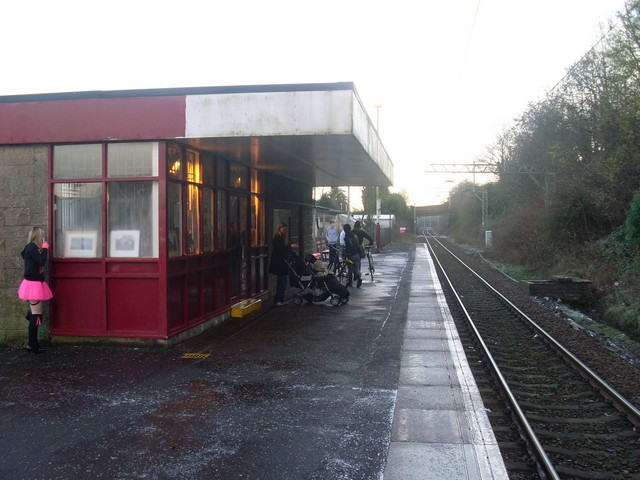
- Looking south from the station, towards Glasgow

General information
- Location: Renton, West Dunbartonshire; Scotland
- Coordinates: 55.9704°N 4.5863°W
- Grid reference: NS386782
- Manager: ScotRail
- Transit authority: SPT
- Platforms: 1

Other information
- Station code: RTN

Key dates
- 15 July 1850: Opened

Passengers
- 2021/22: ▲37,578
- 2022/23: ▲52,900
- 2023/24: ▲60,106
- 2024/25: ▲67,362
- 2025/26: ▲70,676
Location
Notes
- Passenger statistics from the Office of Rail and Road

Renton railway station is a railway station serving the village of Renton, Scotland. The station is managed by ScotRail and is served by its trains on the North Clyde Line. It is sited 18 miles 11 chains (29.2 km) northwest of Glasgow Queen Street (High Level), measured via Singer and Maryhill, between Alexandria and Dalreoch, on the line to Balloch.

== History ==
It was opened in July 1850 by the Caledonian and Dumbartonshire Junction Railway on its line from Bowling (on the north bank of the River Clyde) to Balloch Central. Through running to Glasgow did not commence until 1858, when the Glasgow, Dumbarton and Helensburgh Railway was opened; before this travellers had to transfer to steamships at Bowling to continue their journey southwards. The line through the station used to be double, but was reduced to single track around 1986.

The station buildings have now been taken over by Strathleven Artizans to become one of many taking part in ScotRail's Adopt a Station. The official opening was on 27 March 2010. A heritage centre has been created in a tribute to Robert the Bruce.

== Facilities ==
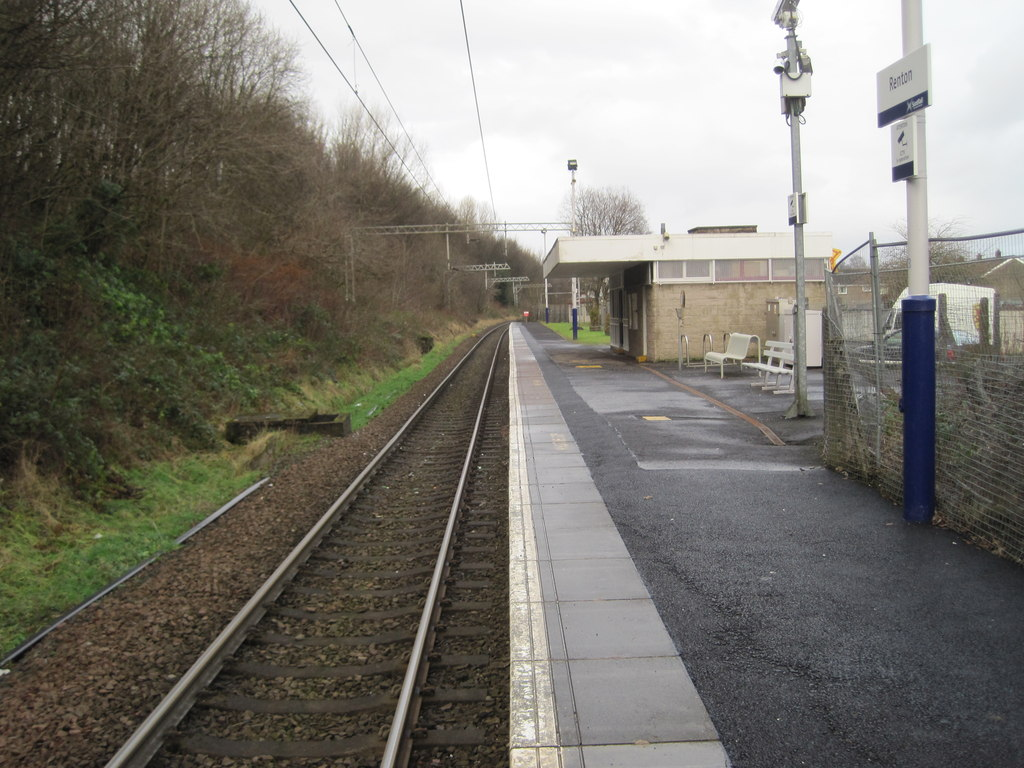
The station looking north

The station has only very basic facilities, being a help point, a bench and some bicycle racks. The ticket office is no longer in use so, given there are no facilities to purchase tickets, passengers must buy one in advance or from the ticket examiner on the train. The station has step-free access.

== Passenger volume ==
Passenger Volume at Renton
	2002-03	2004-05	2005-06	2006-07	2007-08	2008-09	2009-10	2010-11	2011-12	2012-13	2013-14	2014-15	2015-16	2016-17	2017-18	2018-19	2019-20	2020-21
Entries and exits	57,819	62,187	72,280	70,671	75,362	86,192	103,092	102,238	105,876	104,954	123,204	118,356	117,582	118,166	89,424	102,938	93,262	6,292

The statistics cover twelve month periods that start in April.

== Services ==
The typical off-peak service in trains per hour Mondays to Saturdays is:

- 2 tph to Airdrie via Singer and Glasgow Queen Street
- 2 tph to Balloch

The typical service on Sundays is:

- 1 tph to Motherwell via Yoker, Glasgow Central and Whifflet
- 1 tph to Larkhall via Yoker, Glasgow Central and Hamilton Central
- 2 tph to Balloch

Preceding station	National Rail	Following station
Dalreoch	ScotRail; North Clyde Line	Alexandria
	Historical railways	
Dalreoch	CR & NBR; Caledonian and Dumbartonshire Junction Railway	Alexandria
