= Cardross railway station =

Railway station in Argyll and Bute, Scotland

Cardross Scottish Gaelic: Càrdanros
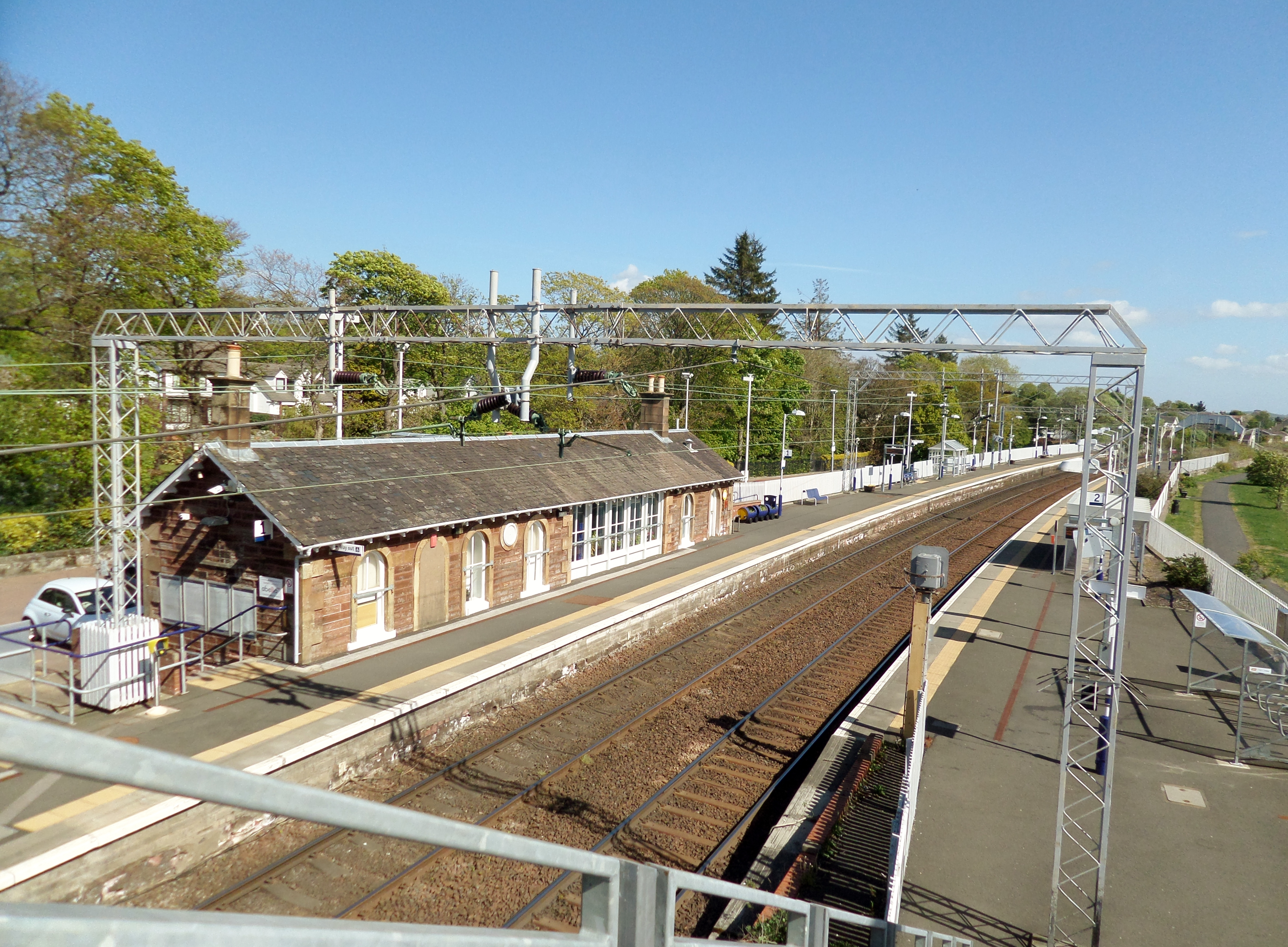

General information
- Location: Cardross, Argyll and Bute; Scotland
- Coordinates: 55.9601°N 4.6526°W
- Grid reference: NS344773
- Manager: ScotRail
- Transit authority: SPT
- Platforms: 2

Other information
- Station code: CDR
- Fare zone: D3

History
- Original company: Glasgow, Dumbarton and Helensburgh Railway
- Pre-grouping: North British Railway
- Post-grouping: LNER

Key dates
- May or June 1858: Station opened
- 1960: Electric train service commenced

Passengers
- 2021/22: ▲0.111 million
- 2022/23: ▲0.126 million
- 2023/24: ▲0.147 million
- 2024/25: ▲0.156 million
- 2025/26: ▼0.154 million

Listed Building – Category C(S)
- Designated: 23 February 1996
- Reference no.: LB42918
Location
Notes
- Passenger statistics from the Office of Rail and Road

Cardross railway station is a railway station serving the village of Cardross, Scotland. The station is 19 miles 50 chains (31.6 km) from Glasgow Queen Street, measured via Singer and Maryhill. It is on the North Clyde Line between Dalreoch and Craigendoran, positioned on the banks of the north side of the River Clyde. The station is managed by ScotRail, who operate all services.

== History ==
The station was opened by the Glasgow, Dumbarton and Helensburgh Railway on 28 May, 31 May, or 7 June 1858. The line was electrified in 1960. There were some goods sidings here previously - possibly built in the late 1940s - but these were removed in the mid-1960s with the end of regular freight movements on the line.

== Facilities ==
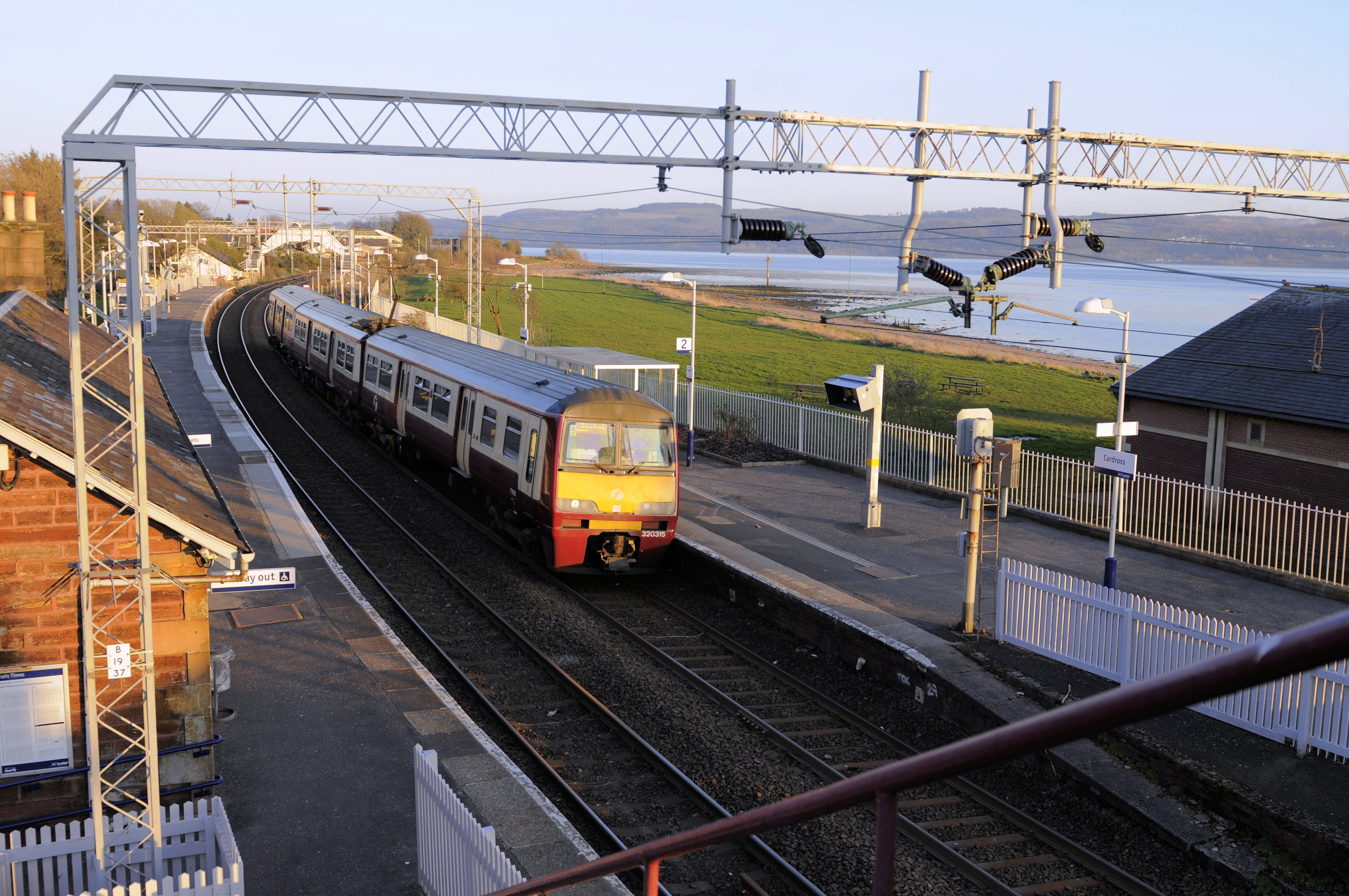
A Class 320 EMU calls at Cardross in 2009

The station is well equipped with shelters, help points and benches on both platforms, as well as a ticket office on bike racks on platform 1, with a car park adjacent. Both platforms have step-free access, and are linked by both a footbridge and a level crossing. Platform 1 unusually has five different points of access, plus others from platform 2, via the footbridge.

== Passenger volume ==
Passenger Volume at Cardross
	2002–03	2004–05	2005–06	2006–07	2007–08	2008–09	2009–10	2010–11	2011–12	2012–13	2013–14	2014–15	2015–16	2016–17	2017–18	2018–19	2019–20	2020–21	2021–22	2022–23
Entries and exits	156,692	186,479	196,675	194,365	204,476	238,070	226,918	227,656	230,504	227,026	227,826	180,394	164,610	145,004	142,808	145,428	121,228	68,212	110,812	126,248

The statistics cover twelve-month periods that start in April.

== Services ==
The typical off-peak service in trains per hour Mondays to Saturdays is:

- 2 tph to Edinburgh Waverley via Glasgow Queen Street (semi-fast)
- 2 tph to Helensburgh Central

On Sundays, the same service operates at the same frequency, but trains heading to Edinburgh Waverley serve all stations via Singer.

There is also a single additional train in the morning to Glasgow Queen Street (high level), which originates from Oban on the West Highland line. Otherwise, trains from this line usually pass through without stopping, and passengers need to change at Dumbarton Central.

Preceding station	National Rail	Following station
Dalreoch	ScotRail; North Clyde Line	Craigendoran
	Historical railways	
Dalreoch; Line and Station open	Glasgow, Dumbarton and Helensburgh Railway; North British Railway	Craigendoran; Line and Station open

== Bibliography ==
- Brailsford, Martyn, ed. (December 2017) [1987]. Railway Track Diagrams 1: Scotland & Isle of Man (6th ed.). Frome: Trackmaps. ISBN 978-0-9549866-9-8.
- Butt, R. V. J. (October 1995). The Directory of Railway Stations: details every public and private passenger station, halt, platform and stopping place, past and present (1st ed.). Sparkford: Patrick Stephens Ltd. ISBN 978-1-85260-508-7. OCLC 60251199. OL 11956311M.
- Jowett, Alan (March 1989). Jowett's Railway Atlas of Great Britain and Ireland: From Pre-Grouping to the Present Day (1st ed.). Sparkford: Patrick Stephens Ltd. ISBN 978-1-85260-086-0. OCLC 22311137.
- Quick, Michael (2022). Railway Passenger Stations in Great Britain: A Chronology (PDF) (5th ed.). London: Railway and Canal Historical Society.
