= Columbus Lighthouse =

The Columbus Lighthouse (Faro a Colón)
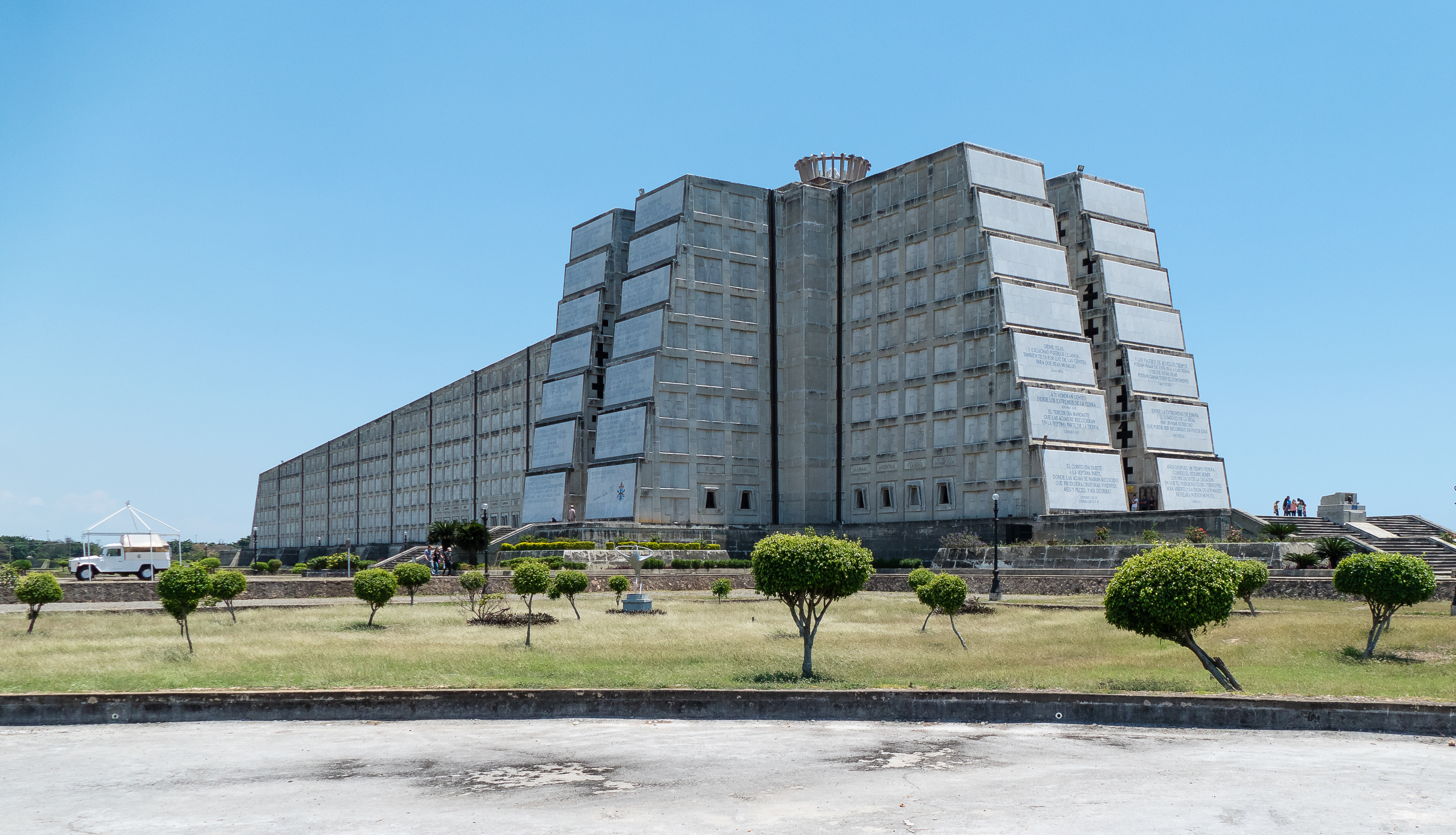
- The Columbus Lighthouse

- Location in Dominican Republic
- Established: 1992
- Location: Santo Domingo Este; Dominican Republic
- Coordinates: 18.47861°N 69.86816°W
- Type: Mausoleum, Museum
- Architects: Teófilo Carbonell; J. L. Gleave

Columbus Lighthouse (Spanish: Faro a Colón, meaning "Columbus Lighthouse") is a mausoleum monument dedicated to Christopher Columbus, located in Santo Domingo Este, Dominican Republic.

Construction began in 1986, based on plans drawn in 1931 by Scottish architect J.L. Gleave. The monument was inaugurated in 1992, in time for the 500th anniversary of Columbus's first voyage. It was funded by the Latin American states at a total cost of approximately US$70 million.

The monument's lighthouse-style features include projecting beams of light that form a cross shape. These beams are so powerful that they can be seen from neighboring Puerto Rico.

== Overview ==
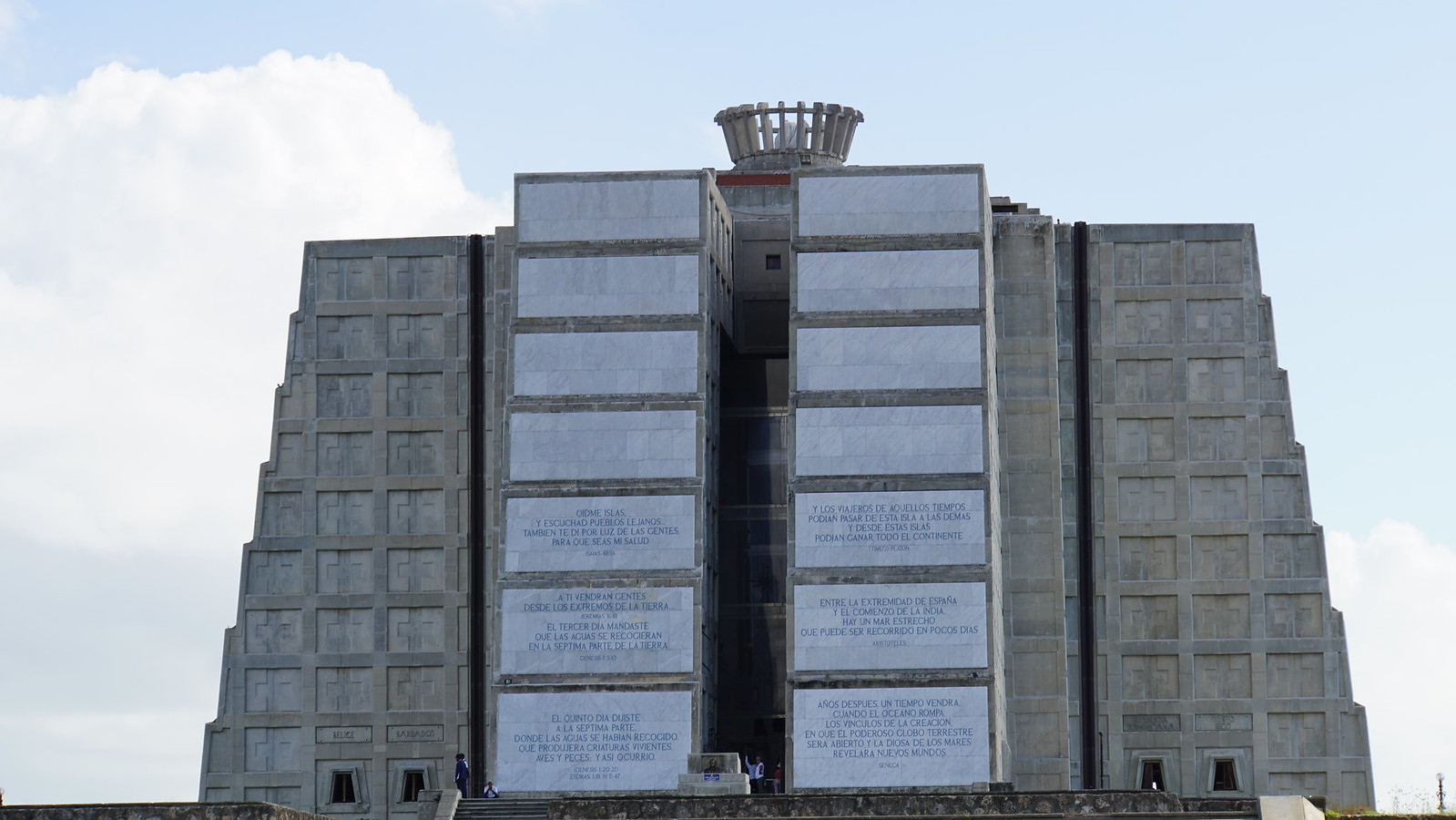
The lighthouse in 2015

The Columbus Lighthouse is a cross-shaped monument made of reinforced concrete with dimensions of 680 feet (210 m) by 195 feet (59 m). The cross is meant to represent the Christianization of the Americas. There are 157 beams of light that emanate from the structure towards the sky, as well as a rotating beam, which is visible from space.

According to Dominican authorities, the lighthouse shelters remains of Christopher Columbus. However, Spanish authorities have proven through DNA tests that the Cathedral of Seville contains Columbus's remains. Researchers note that this evidence does not exclude the possibility that some bones in Santo Domingo also belong to the explorer. The Dominican authorities have not allowed the same DNA tests to be performed on the remains in the lighthouse, making it impossible to confirm the presence of Columbus's remains. The monument functions as both a mausoleum and a museum showcasing objects, including a boat from Cuba and Colombian jewelry.

Once a year, on Columbus Day, the remains are displayed in their crypt behind a sheet of glass.

== History ==
Columbus Tomb at Columbus Lighthouse, Santo Domingo, Dominican Republic

Dominican historian Antonio Delmonte y Tejada expressed the idea of erecting a monument in honor of Columbus in Santo Domingo in his 1852 book, History of Santo Domingo. In 1914, American Pulliam William Ellis began promoting a monumental beacon in the first city of the New World to the American press. The concept was accepted during the 1923 Fifth International Conference in Chile, which decreed that all governments and peoples of the Americas should cooperate to build the monument.

Scottish architect Joseph Lea Gleave won a competition that included 455 participants from 48 countries. The event was held in Brazil in 1931, with judges including architects Horacio Acosta y Lara (Uruguay), Eliel Saarinen (Finland), and Frank Lloyd Wright (USA). However, by 1950, only eight countries had contributed, totaling less than $15,000. The Dominican government moved forward with the project, and the foundation was dug in 1948. Growing political instability halted construction after 1948 until 1986. During the government of Joaquín Balaguer, construction resumed under the supervision of Dominican architect Teófilo Carbonell, culminating in its completion in 1992, in time for the celebration of the quincentennial discovery of the Americas.

Though conceived by Gleave as a mausoleum, the monument was adapted to house a permanent collection of exhibitions from countries of the Americas, as well as other European and Asian countries, as requested by former President Balaguer. The exhibitions house items of cultural heritage from each country. Tony Horwitz wrote in 2008 that the United States's exhibition included a few small photographs of Independence Day celebrations, along with many poster-sized reproductions of newspaper front pages reporting on the September 11, 2001, terrorist attacks. By 2026 only 9 old pictures of Native Americans were on display.

== See also ==
- List of monuments and memorials to Christopher Columbus
