= Argyll (car) =

Automobile manufacturer in Scotland

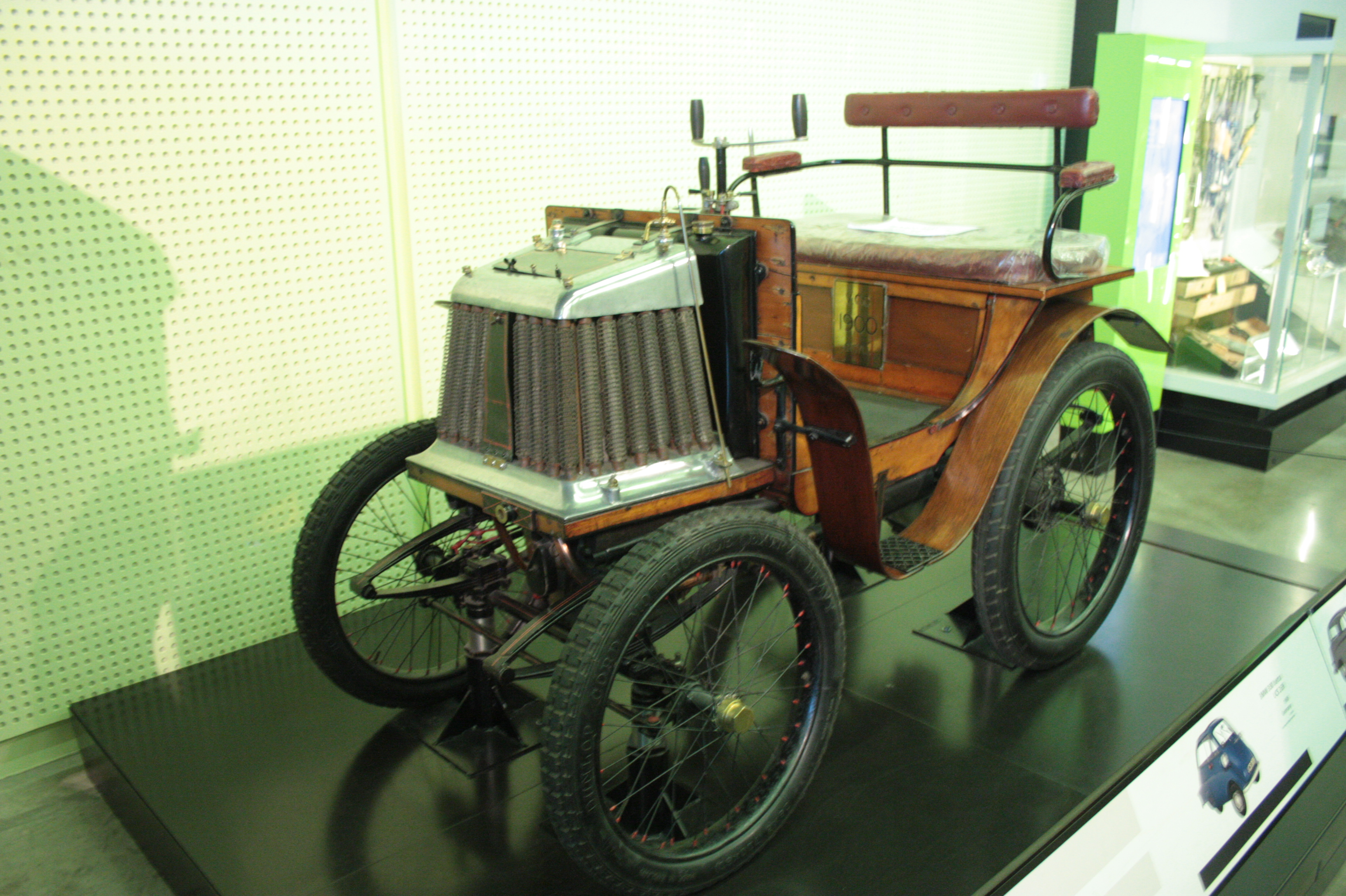
5hp Argyll Voiturette 1900

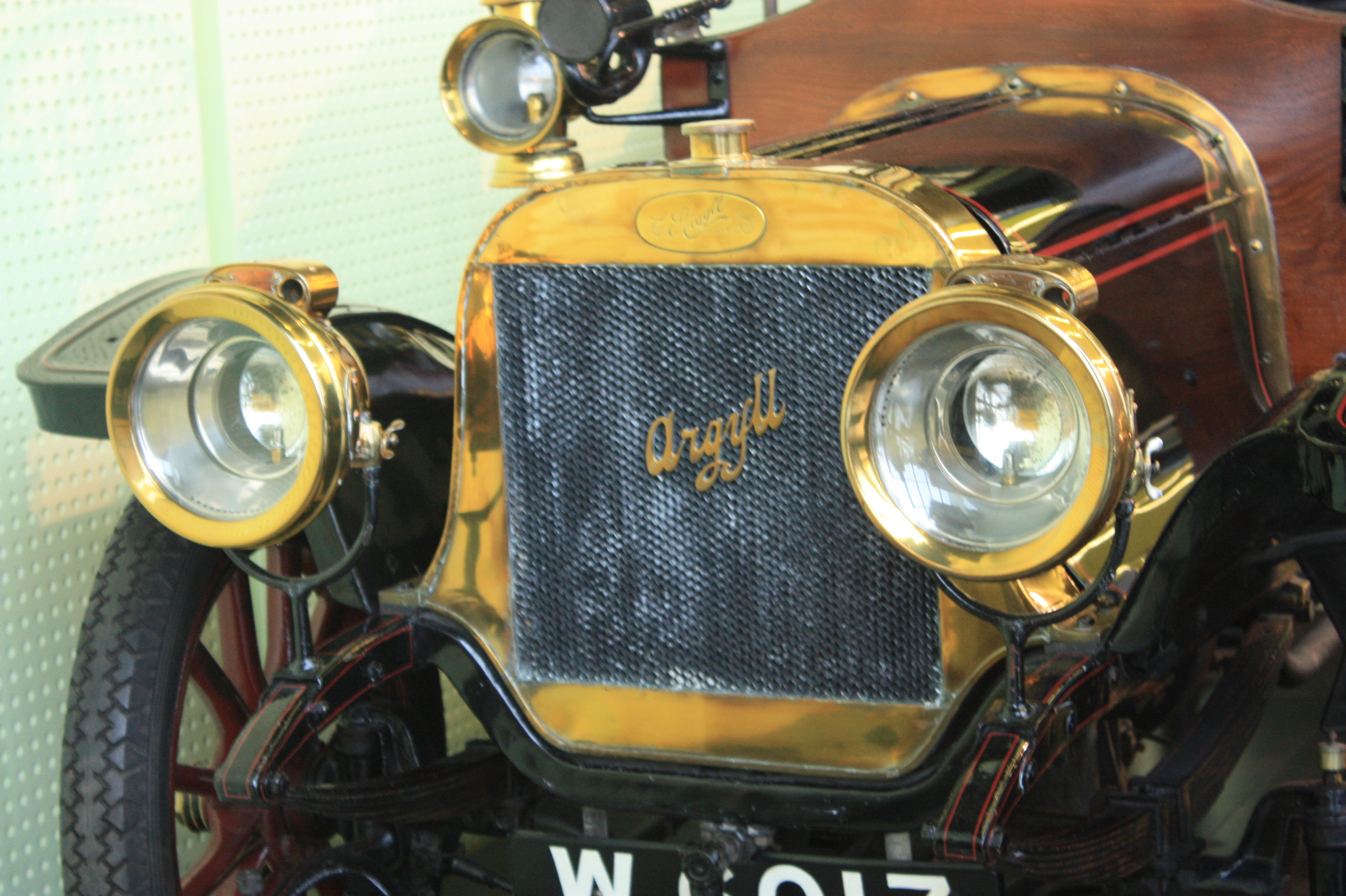
Front of a 1908 Argyll 14 16

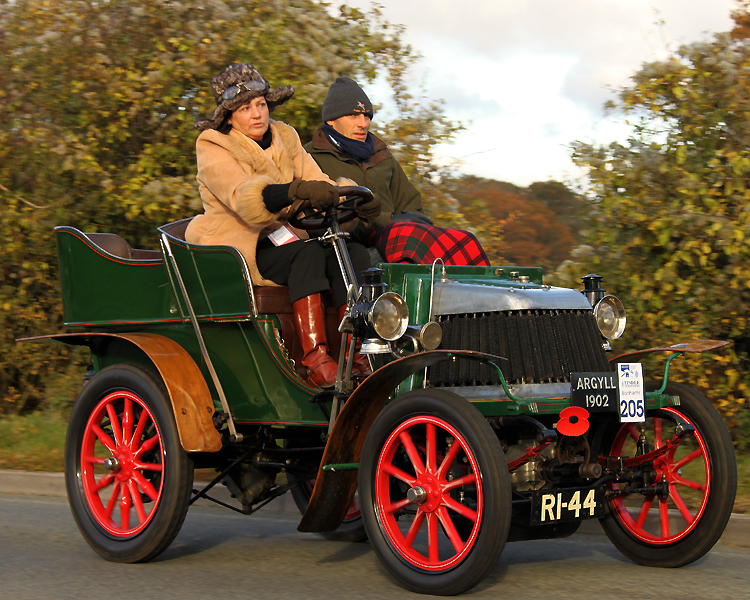
Argyll 8HP Rear-entrance tonneau 1902

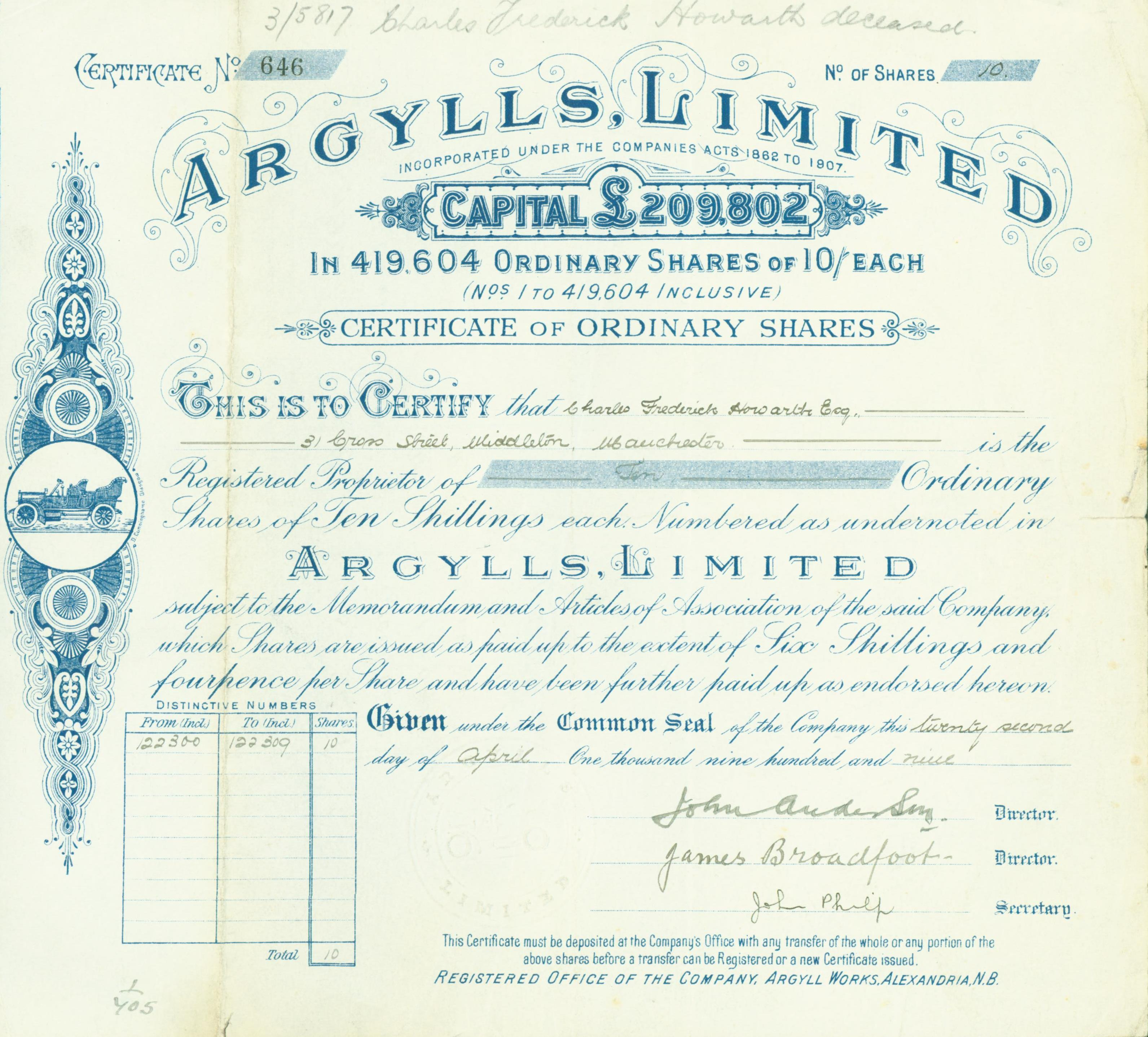
Share of the Argylls Ltd., issued 22. April 1909

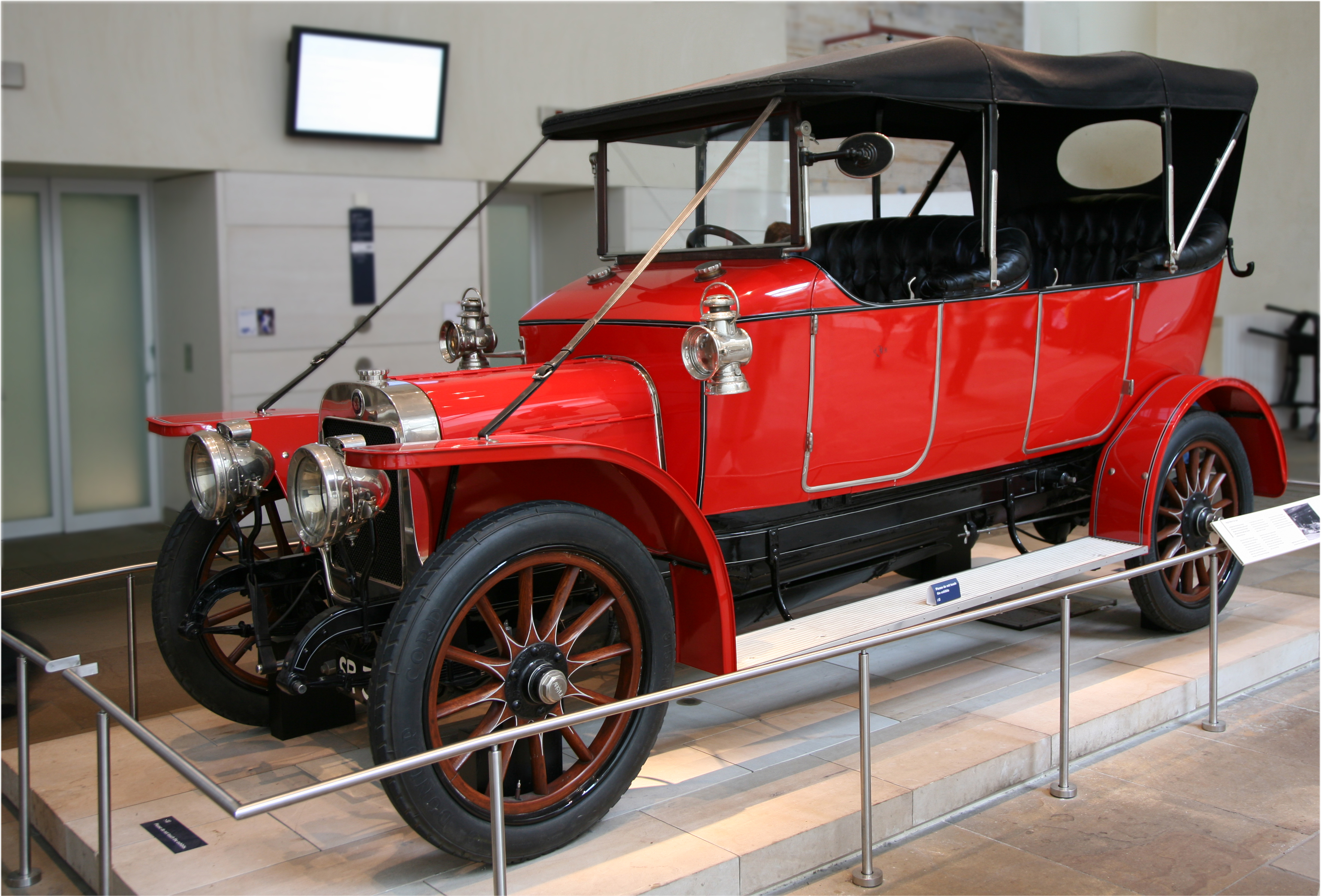
Flying Fifteen by Argyll

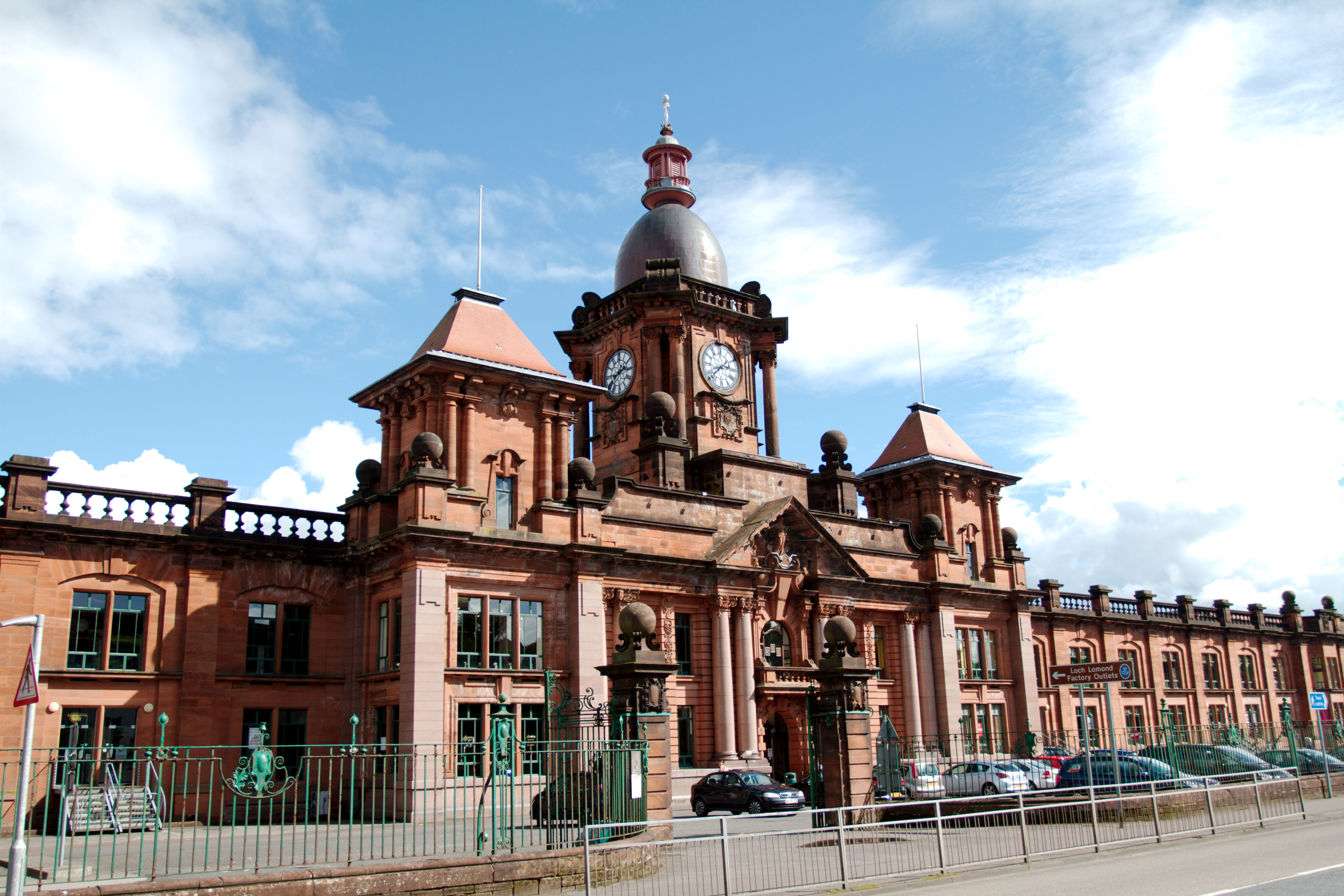
Facade of the Argyll Motor Works a Category A listed building in Alexandria, West Dunbartonshire, Scotland.

Argyll was a Scottish motor car marque manufactured from 1899 to 1932, and again from 1976 to around 1990.

== The original Argyll marque ==
Alex Govan founded The Hozier Engineering Company in 1899, and it was at this factory that the first Argyll Voiturette was produced; copied from the contemporary Renault, it featured a 2¾ hp de Dion engine and shaft-drive. 1901 models had an upgraded engine of 5 hp; cars made in 1902 were upgraded even further, using 8 hp units. Soon, there appeared a 10 hp twin with radiator tubes forming the sides of the hood; in 1904, the company introduced a range of Aster-engined cars with front-mounted radiators. One of these was a 10 hp of 1985 cc; others were fours of 3054 cc, 3686 cc, and 4849 cc. All cars featured Govan's rather awkward gearbox, which had a T-shaped gate and separate reverse and change-speed levers. The company, by now named Argyll Motors Ltd. had now become Scotland's biggest marque and soon moved from its premises in Bridgeton, Glasgow to a grand, purpose-built factory in Alexandria, West Dunbartonshire. The Argyll Motor Works covered 12 acres (4.9 ha), had its own railway line, and was opened in 1906 by John Douglas-Scott-Montagu, 2nd Baron Montagu of Beaulieu. However, the new factory was never used to capacity, and the company began to decline after Govan's death in 1907. It went into liquidation in 1908.

Production restarted in 1910, under a company now named Argylls Ltd., with a new range of cars including the famed "Flying Fifteen", and a six-cylinder model. The 12/14 was widely sold as a taxi, even being exported to New York. Four-wheel brakes designed by J.M. Rubury of Argyll and patented on 18 March 1910 by Henri Perrot and John Meredith Rubury (Patent number 6807) were available from 1911 on, and in 1912 the single Sleeve valve engine designed by company director Baillie P. Burt and J. P. McCollum began production; the entire range featured Burt-McCollum engines by 1914.

In May 1914, Argylls submitted two water-cooled 6-cylinder inline aero-engines to the British War Office as part of a contest to select new aircraft engines. During the competition one of the engines broke its crankshaft. The other engine completed a six-hour run test at full load, winning a £100 prize. Ultimately the type was not selected for production.

Argylls changed hands in 1914 and the Alexandria factory was sold to the Royal Navy for torpedo production. Car production was resumed on a small scale in the original Bridgeton works under the control of John Brimlow who had previously run the repair department. The first product from the new company was a revival of the pre-war 15·9 hp model, now with electric starter but few were sold. In 1922, it was joined by a 1½-litre sleeve valve model and in 1926 by the 12/40 sports.

The company made a final appearance at the London Motor Show in 1927 and the last cars were probably made in 1928 though still advertised until Argyll closed in 1932.

== Models ==
Model	Period	Cylinders	Bore x Stroke	Displacement	Performance	Wheelbase
14/16 HP	1905-1910	4 Cyl.	90 mm x 120 mm	186.4 cu in (3,054 cc)	20.3 hp (15 kW)	2,464 mm (97.0 in)
16/20 HP	1905-1908	4 Cyl.	95 mm x 130 mm	224.9 cu in (3,686 cc)	25 hp (19 kW)	2,743 mm (108.0 in)
26/30 HP	1906-1907	4 Cyl.	105 mm x 140 mm	295.9 cu in (4,849 cc)	32.4 hp (24 kW)	2,769 mm (109.0 in)
10/12 HP	1905-1907	2 Cyl.	95 mm x 140 mm	121.1 cu in (1,985 cc)	13.4 hp (10 kW)	1,854 mm (73.0 in)

== The second Argyll era ==
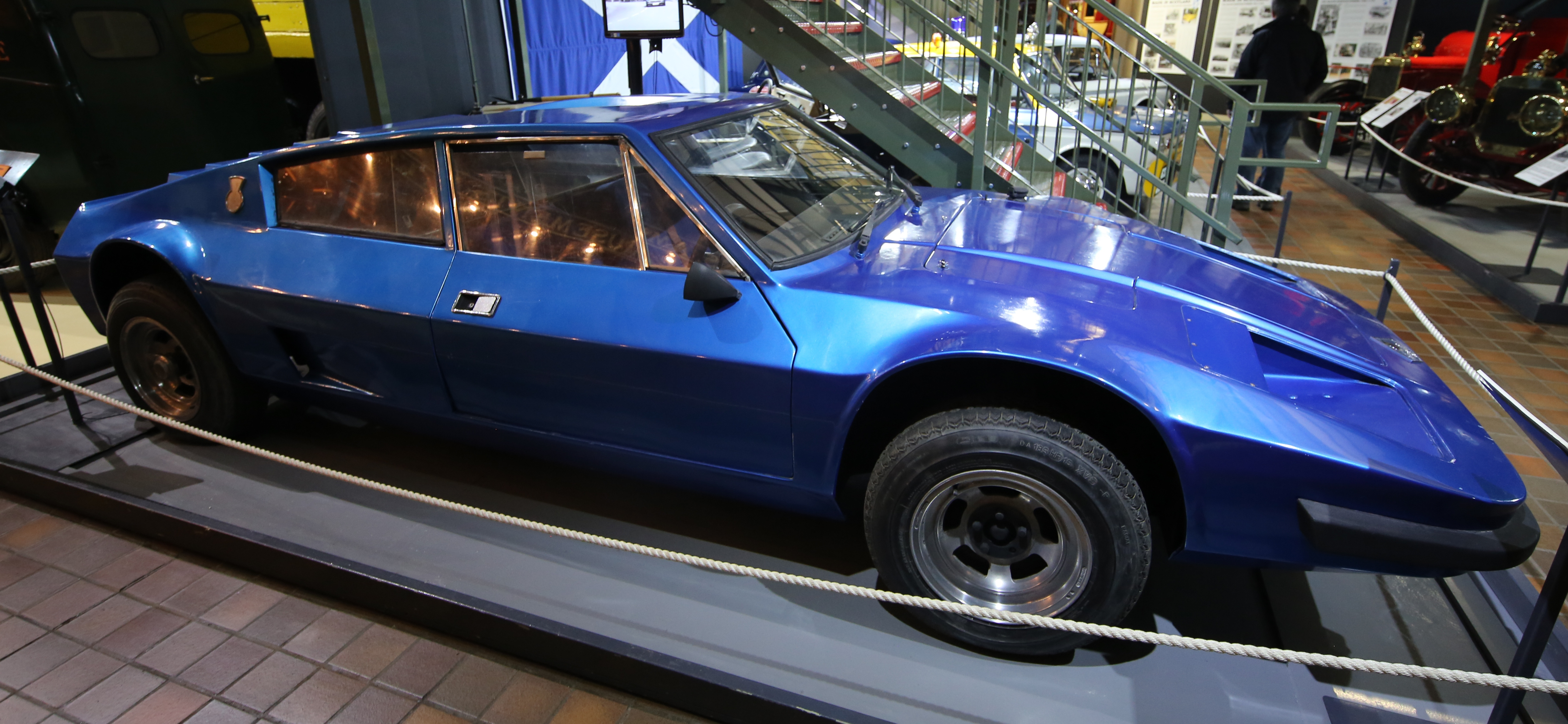
The Argyll turbo GT prototype

The name was re-used in 1976 by a new company who made a mid-engined sports car, the Argyll GT, in Lochgilphead, Scotland.

The new manufacturing company was founded by Bob Henderson. The new car was named after the original Argyll of 1898, in honour of a grandfather of one of the investors who worked in the Argyll factory at Alexandria.

The only model was the mid-engined Argyll GT (or "Turbo GT"), which was based on a sturdy box section chassis with space frame clothed in a fibreglass bodyshell made next door to the old Arrol-Johnston factory in Dumfries by Solway Marine. The 1976 prototype car featured a turbocharged Rover V8 engine. A version with a turbocharged Saab engine was also mooted, but none were built. The suspension came from the Triumph 2500 and the gearbox was a ZF 5-speed unit. By undoing ten bolts, the entire rear end, suspension, gearbox and engine came away.

A production version of the car, which made its debut in 1983, had a non-turbocharged version of the Douvrin Euro V6 as used by Renault, Peugeot and others, together with a Renault 30 transaxle. A turbocharged V8 of 3.5 - 4.2 litres, together with the ZF transmission, was an option, but none were built. Other engine options were the Lancia Beta engine and transmission, and a Buick V6 which had started out as a stillborn Indycar engine. A top speed of 160 mph (ca. 260 km/h) with the turbo V8 was claimed but never ratified. The quoted price at launch was £25-30,000, which was comparable to the contemporary Ferrari 308 GTB. Production capacity was stated to be twelve cars a year, but none were sold. The silver version used for the launch and publicity material belonged to the company accountant and was virtually never driven.

== See also ==
- List of car manufacturers of the United Kingdom
