= Alexandria, West Dunbartonshire =

Town in West Dunbartonshire, Scotland

Coordinates: 55°59′N 4°35′W

Alexandria
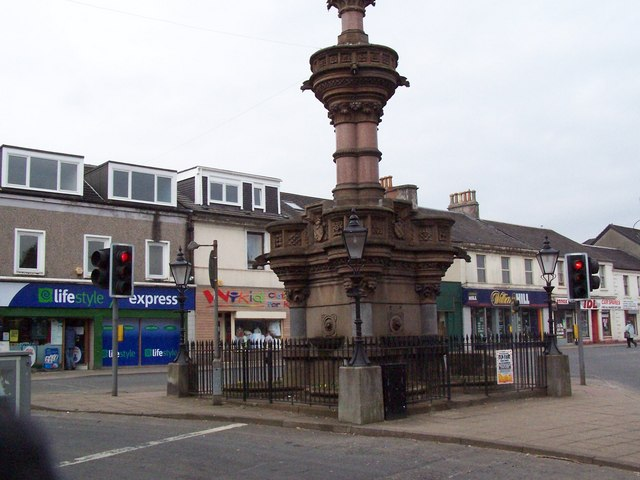
- Smollett Fountain, Alexandria

- Location within West Dunbartonshire
- Population: 6,710 (2020)
- OS grid reference: NS3980
- Council area: West Dunbartonshire
- Country: Scotland
- Sovereign state: United Kingdom
- Post town: ALEXANDRIA
- Postcode district: G83
- Dialling code: 01389
- Police: Scotland
- Fire: Scottish
- Ambulance: Scottish
- UK Parliament: West Dunbartonshire
- Scottish Parliament: Dumbarton

Alexandria is a town in West Dunbartonshire, Scotland. The town is on the River Leven, three miles (five kilometres) north of Dumbarton and 15 mi (24 km) north-west of Glasgow.

== Demographics ==
In 2016, the estimated population of the town was 6,860. It is one of five towns in the Vale of Leven, the others being Balloch, Bonhill, Jamestown and Renton; their combined population is over 20,000.

== Economy ==
The town's traditional industries, most importantly cotton manufacturing, bleaching and printing, have been phased out. In the 1970s Alexandria was redeveloped, with a new town centre layout and traffic system. Local landmarks include Christie Park and the Category B listed Smollett Fountain in the town centre. Lomond Galleries on North Main Street is a former car factory with an impressive dome and an even more impressive marble entrance hall and staircase. It was originally built in 1906 as the Argyll Motor Works, for Argyll Motors Ltd. A carving above the entrance shows one of the company's cars. After the car production ceased in 1914, it was used by the Admiralty for the manufacture of torpedoes, which were test-fired in Loch Long, and in the early 1970s was the scene of the Plessey sit-in. The building now hosts a shopping mall but has retained many of its striking architectural features.

Major employers in the area were Westclox and Polaroid, both based in the Leven Industrial Estate; Aggreko based a major purpose-built factory in the estate from 2000 to 2010. The Ballantine's whisky distillery continues to operate in the estate.

== Transport ==
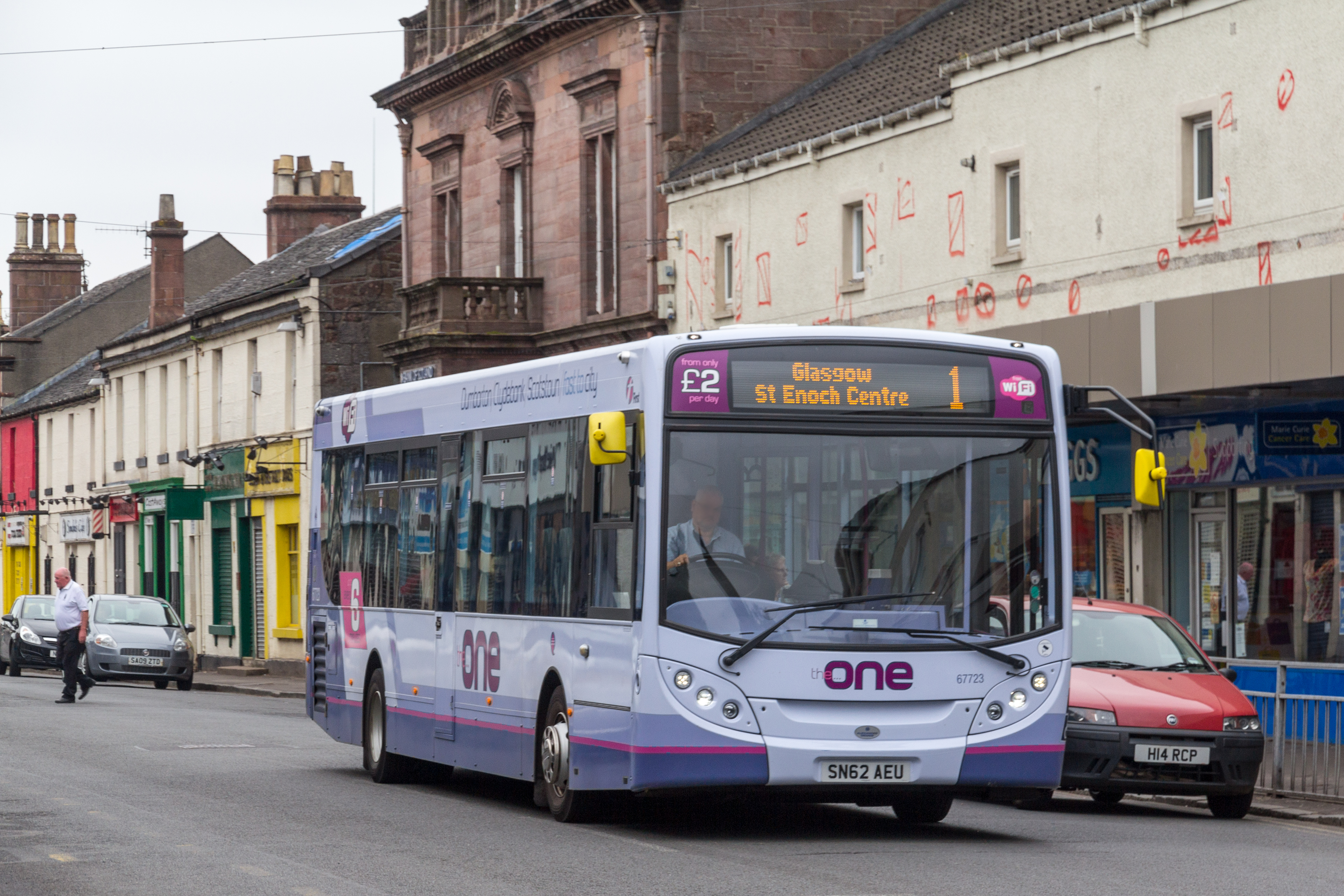
Bus on Main street

Alexandria sits on the former A82 main road between Glasgow and Loch Lomond. There are regular bus services on the route, and the town has a railway station on the rail line between Balloch and Glasgow Queen Street.

Alexandria is reputed to be the only town in the UK with a railway station, carnival (periodically Codona's travelling fair sets up in the car park) and a pub in the middle of a roundabout. A. J. Cronin's uncle owned a pub in Bridge Street. Alexandria Library is located on Gilmour Street.

== Sport ==
The town is home to Vale of Leven football club, who play at Millburn Park. The club was a dominant force in early Scottish football history, winning the Scottish Cup in 1877, 1878 and 1879, and were founder members of the Scottish Football League.

Gordon Reid, born in Alexandria, has won the Wimbledon Tennis Men's Wheelchair Doubles, with his partner Alfie Hewett, three times.

== ROC Bunker ==
Between 1961 and 1991, the village was the location of a Royal Observer Corps Master bunker, to be used in the event of a nuclear attack. It remains mostly intact.

== Notable natives and residents ==
- Stuart David, writer and musician (Belle and Sebastian)
- Zander Diamond, Scottish professional footballer
- John Miller "Ian" McColl, Scottish footballer and manager of the Scotland national team
- Morgan McMichaels, Scottish-American drag queen and reality television personality
- Dawn O'Porter, British writer, director and television presenter
- Bobby Kerr, Scottish professional footballer, captain of Sunderland A.F.C.'s 1973 FA Cup-winning team
- Malcolm Finlayson (14 June 1930 – 26 November 2014) was a Scottish football goalkeeper who won the Football League Championship and FA Cup with Wolverhampton Wanderers.
