= Balloch Steam Slipway =

- Balloch, Scotland; GB grid reference NS385824
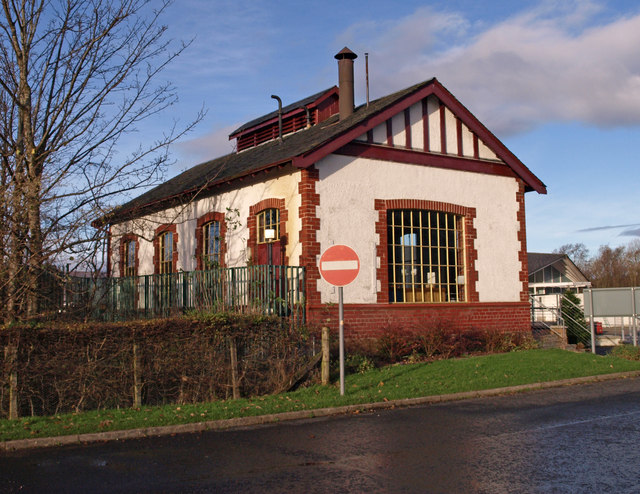
- The Balloch Slipway Winchhouse

Location
- Location within West Dunbartonshire
- Coordinates: 56.0077°N 4.5909°W

The Balloch Steam Slipway consists of a ramp, carriage and steam powered winch located on the shores of Loch Lomond by which ships or boats can be moved in and out of the loch, usually for repairs and general maintenance. It is owned and operated by the Loch Lomond Steamship Company. It is thought to be Europe's last steam operated winch and it is contained within a railway-style winch house that is category A listed.

== Infrastructure ==
The complex includes a slipway, carriage, boiler, steam engine and hauling gear and winch house.

== History ==
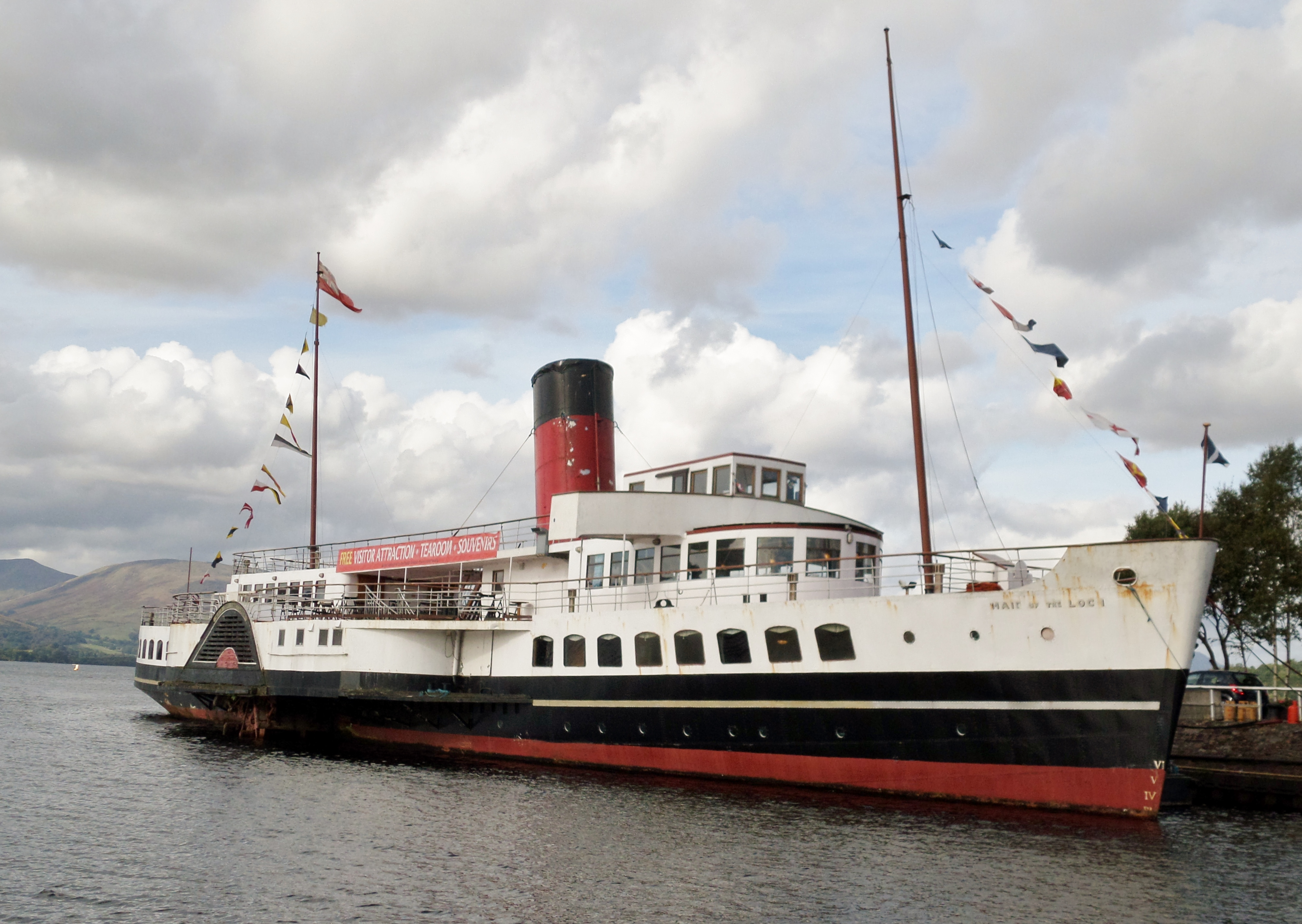
The PS Maid of the Loch was annually hauled out of Loch Lomond during the winter

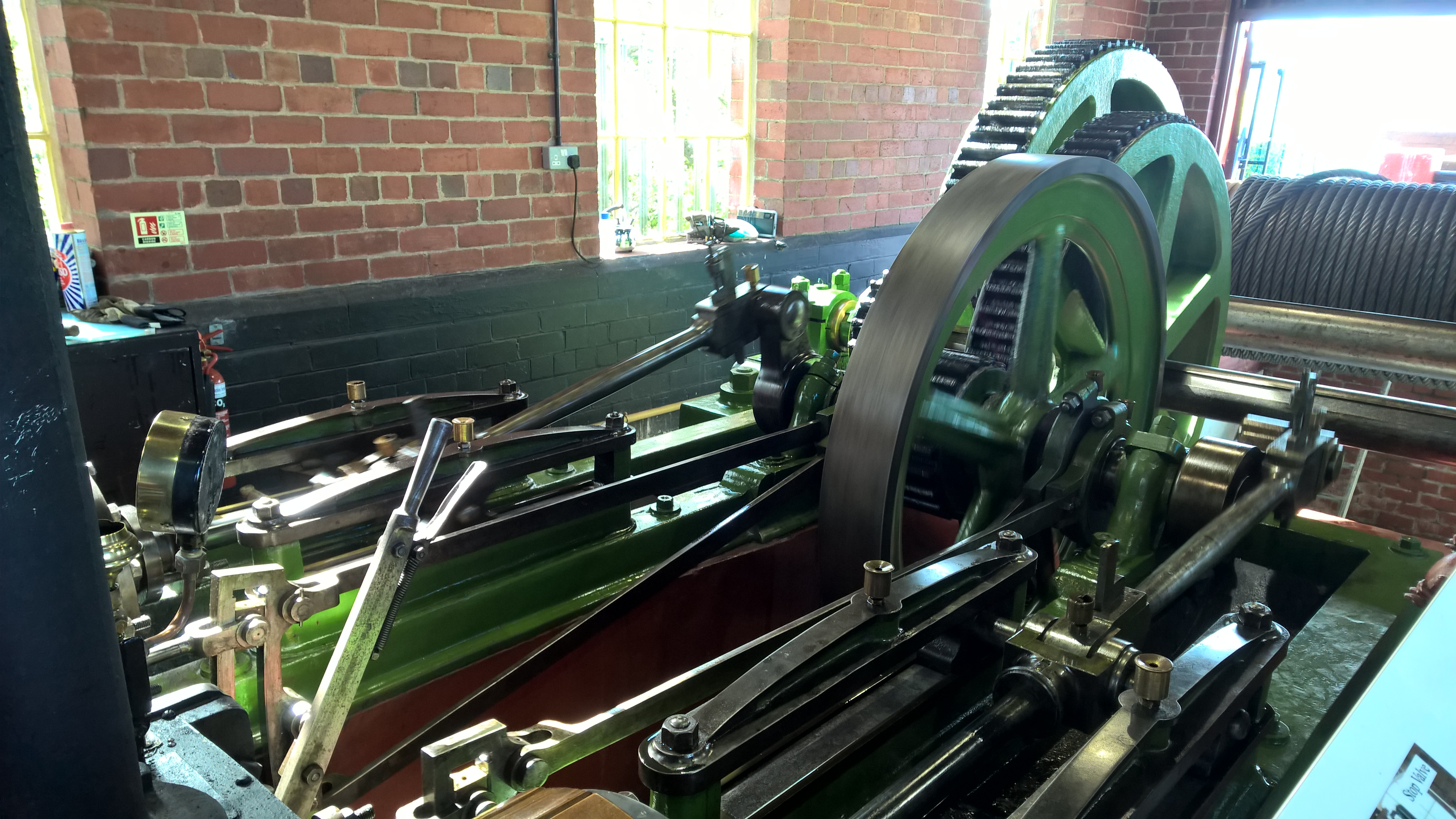
The steam engine

The slipway construction started in 1900 and it was opened by the Dunbarton & Balloch Joint Line Committee in 1902 and finally fell out of use circa 1989. The railway-style winch house is a category A listed building. Following a £620,000 restoration project the Balloch slipway complex was officially reopened by the Princess Royal in 2006. George Halliday Ltd. of Rothesay and John Bennie of Glasgow were the original contractors.

The PS Maid of the Loch was re-assembled on the slipway in 1953 following its construction, disassembly and transport by rail to a siding lying parallel to the slipway and launched on 25 May 1953. The Maid was taken onto the slip on 27 June 2006 after 25 years berthed at Balloch Pier.

== Workings details ==
=== The boiler ===
The present reconditioned vertical water-tube boiler was taken from a steam crane built in 1953 that had been converted to diesel. To reduce smoke nuisance was converted to burn light oil by McEwen Ltd. of Keighley in Yorkshire. It was built by Cowans, Sheldon of Carlisle and is a Spencer-Hopwood pattern, with has an operating pressure of 100 pounds per square inch (7 bar).

=== The steam engine ===
The steam engine installed is a twin horizontal single-expansion design built in 1902 by John Bennie of Glasgow with a rated power of 50 bhp (37 kW) and an actual or shaft power output of 33 brake horsepower (25 kW). The length of the piston stroke is 20 inches (51 cm). On the last few occasions that the winch was used prior to restoration the steam engine was powered by compressed air to save buying a new boiler.

=== The winch ===
Three sets of gears on the winch create a gear ratio of approximately 1:113 so that 113 turns of the steam engine are required to turn the winding drum with its steel cable just one full rotation, however this gives enough force to pull even a ship the size of the Maid of the Loch slowly out of the water.

=== The carriage or cradle ===
The carriage was badly damaged when the PS Countess Fiona was broken up on the slipway in 1999 and a new deck was made from Douglas Fir at Bellshill in Lanarkshire. As many components as possible of the old carriage were re-used. Twenty-four two-wheeled bogies run on either side of the central rails that have 41 four-wheeled bogies and the whole carriage structure runs upon these.

The four cast iron rails run over 300 feet into the waters of the loch and this section was badly corroded. Two central rails have a locking rack between them so that pawls on the central bogies can drop down and lock the carriage or cradle firmly in position as required. The gradient of the slip is 1 in 18 and the total length of the rails is 560 feet or 171 metres. The angle on the carriage, combined with the angle of the slip gives the suitable overall gradient of 1 in 44.5 for a ship.

== The site today ==
The £620,000 restoration means that the PS Maid of the Loch can be removed from the water whenever required and other Loch Lomond ships can also use this facility.

The winch house was never previously open to the public however it now has frequently open days and has regular 'in steam' open days.

The PS Maid of the Loch paddlesteamer is berthed at the nearby Balloch Pier.

The Loch Lomond Shores visitor attractions and retail outlets are located nearby.

== Micro-history ==
A slipway once existed at Luss and work even started on a dry dock at the Garabal Basin on the Inverarnan Canal.
