= Balloch, West Dunbartonshire =

Village in West Dunbartonshire, Scotland

Coordinates: 56.002°N 4.580°W

Balloch: Scottish Gaelic: Am Bealach
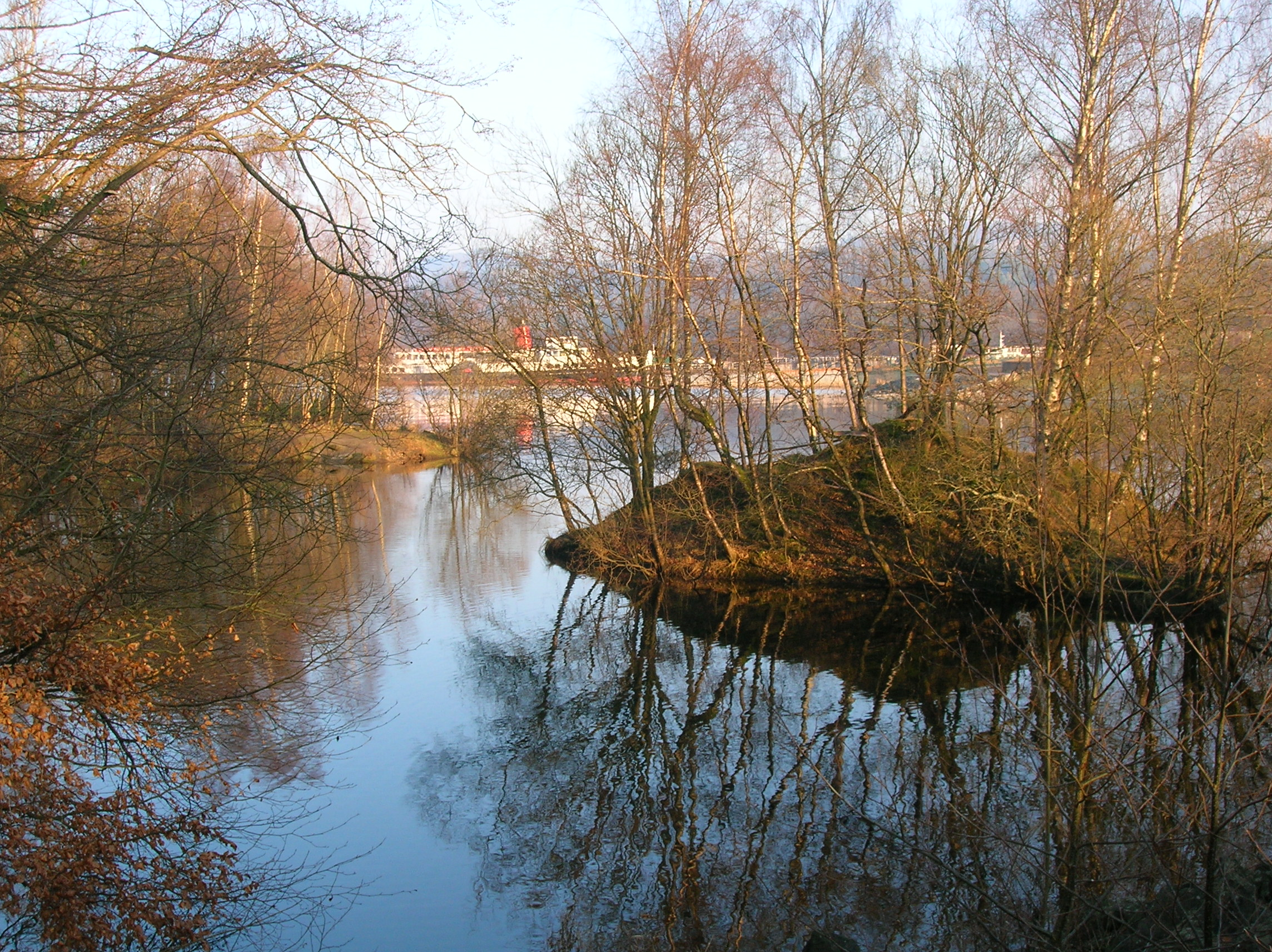
- National Park Visitor Centre with the 'Maid of the Loch' in the background

- Location within West Dunbartonshire
- Population: 6,010 (2020)
- OS grid reference: NS390820
  - Edinburgh: 54 mi (87 km)
  - London: 360 mi (580 km)
- Civil parish: Bonhill
- Council area: West Dunbartonshire
- Lieutenancy area: Dunbartonshire
- Country: Scotland
- Sovereign state: United Kingdom
- Post town: ALEXANDRIA
- Postcode district: G83
- Dialling code: 01389
- Police: Scotland
- Fire: Scottish
- Ambulance: Scottish
- UK Parliament: West Dunbartonshire
- Scottish Parliament: Dumbarton

Balloch (/ˈbɑːləx/ BAH-ləkh; Scottish Gaelic: Am Bealach) is a village in West Dunbartonshire, Scotland, at the foot of Loch Lomond.

== Etymology ==
Balloch comes from either the Gaelic word baile that means village or hamlet, or the Gaelic bealach meaning "a pass". Using the former derivation, Balloch means "village on the loch", i.e. the nearby Loch Lomond, but this would be Baile Loch.

== Geography ==
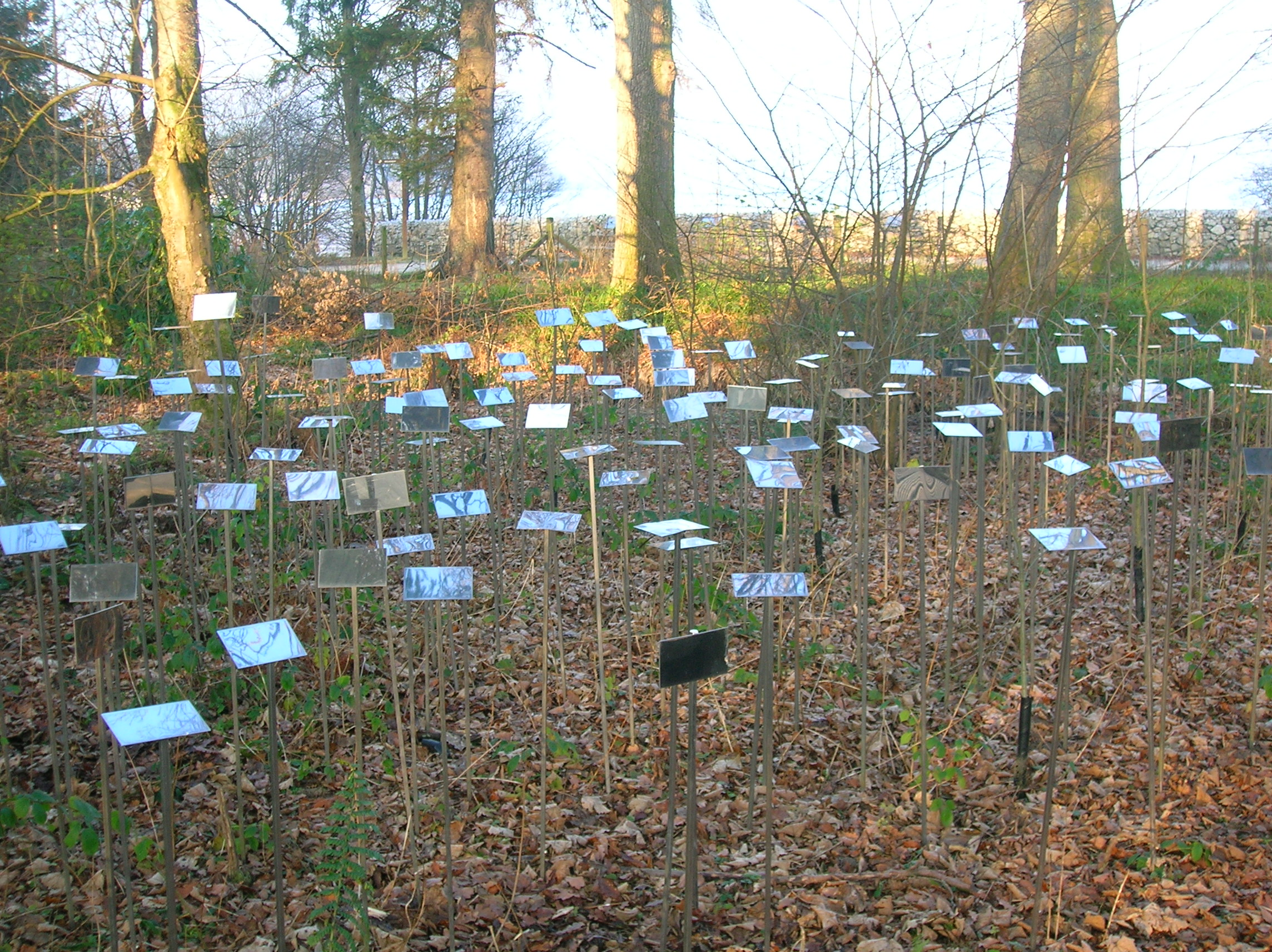
An environmental art installation in the woods at Balloch

Balloch is at the north end of the Vale of Leven, straddling the River Leven itself. It connects to the larger town of Alexandria and to the smaller village of Jamestown, both of which are located to its south. It also borders the Kilpatrick Hills. To the east of the town lies the major local authority housing scheme in the area known as 'The Haldane' or 'The Mill of Haldane'. Glasgow is located around 16 miles (26 km) to the southeast. Balloch lies on the 56th parallel at about the same latitude as Moscow.

== Tourism ==
With its accessible location at the southern end of Loch Lomond and just off the main road from Glasgow to the West Highlands (A82), it is an important centre of tourism, especially from Glasgow. The village has a number of hotels, inns and pubs, and there are cruises from Balloch up Loch Lomond, and other services, including to nearby locations like Luss, and the Renfrew Ferry service. The largest number of boats cruising on Loch Lomond leave from Balloch. The village is also the home of Dunkirk vessel Skylark IX which helped rescue 600 troops during WWII. It contains Balloch Country Park and Balloch Castle, and is at the southern end of the first Scottish national park, Loch Lomond and The Trossachs National Park. There is a Sea Life Centre in the village. The Loch Lomond Youth Soccer Festival used to take place in the village. "Lochfoot" in the Jean Robertson novels of Jane Duncan is partly based on the village. The PS Maid of the Loch is currently being restored at Balloch pier and the Balloch Steam Slipway is located nearby.

== Transport ==
The A811 road (based on an 18th-century military road) goes from Balloch to Stirling, and the A813 goes from Dumbarton to Balloch. The Glasgow to Loch Lomond cycle path (part of National Cycle Route 7) ends at Balloch. The West Loch Lomond Cycle Path also runs from Balloch.

The village was formerly served by two railway stations on the Caledonian and Dunbartonshire Junction Railway: Balloch Central, and Balloch Pier, which closed in 1988 and 1986, respectively. The village now has one railway station opened by British Rail, which is a terminus of the North Clyde electric train service from Glasgow.

Buses are run by First Greater Glasgow, Scottish Citylink (West Coast Motors), Ember and McColls Travel.

== Education ==
Balloch is served by Balloch Primary School and St Kessog's Primary school, both located at the newly built Balloch Campus. Balloch Primary School is the result of a merger between Haldane Primary School and Jamestown Primary School In 2018.

== Notable residents ==
- Jessie Campbell, pioneer of higher education for women
- George Findlay, Victoria Cross recipient
- Ross Murdoch, swimmer, gold medallist at the 2016 European Championships
- Morgan McMichaels, drag queen
- Sharleen Spiteri, singer-songwriter; guitarist; lead vocalist of the Scottish pop-rock band Texas

== See also ==
- List of places in West Dunbartonshire
