= Balloch Central railway station =

Disused railway station in Scotland

Balloch Central
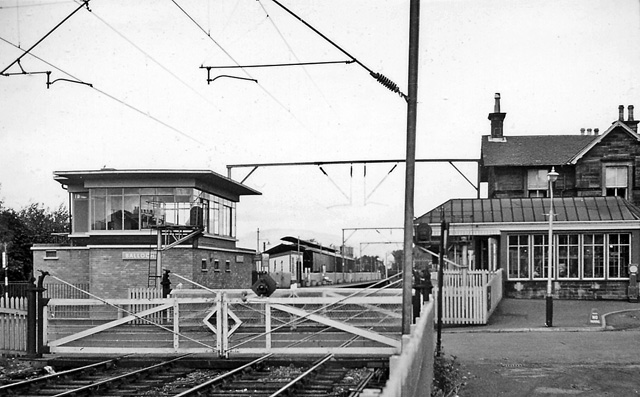
- Balloch Central in 1961

General information
- Location: Balloch, West Dunbartonshire; Scotland
- Coordinates: 56.00383°N 4.58355°W
- Line: North Clyde
- Platforms: 2

Other information
- Status: Disused

History
- Original company: Caledonian and Dumbartonshire Junction Railway
- Pre-grouping: Caledonian Railway & North British Railway
- Post-grouping: LMS & LNER

Key dates
- 15 July 1850: Opened as Balloch D&B
- 30 June 1952: Renamed Balloch Central
- 23 April 1988: Closed
Location

Balloch Central railway station was the main railway station serving the town of Balloch in Scotland. It was opened on 15 July 1850 by the Caledonian and Dumbartonshire Junction Railway. It was renamed Balloch Central on 30 June 1952.

== Operations ==
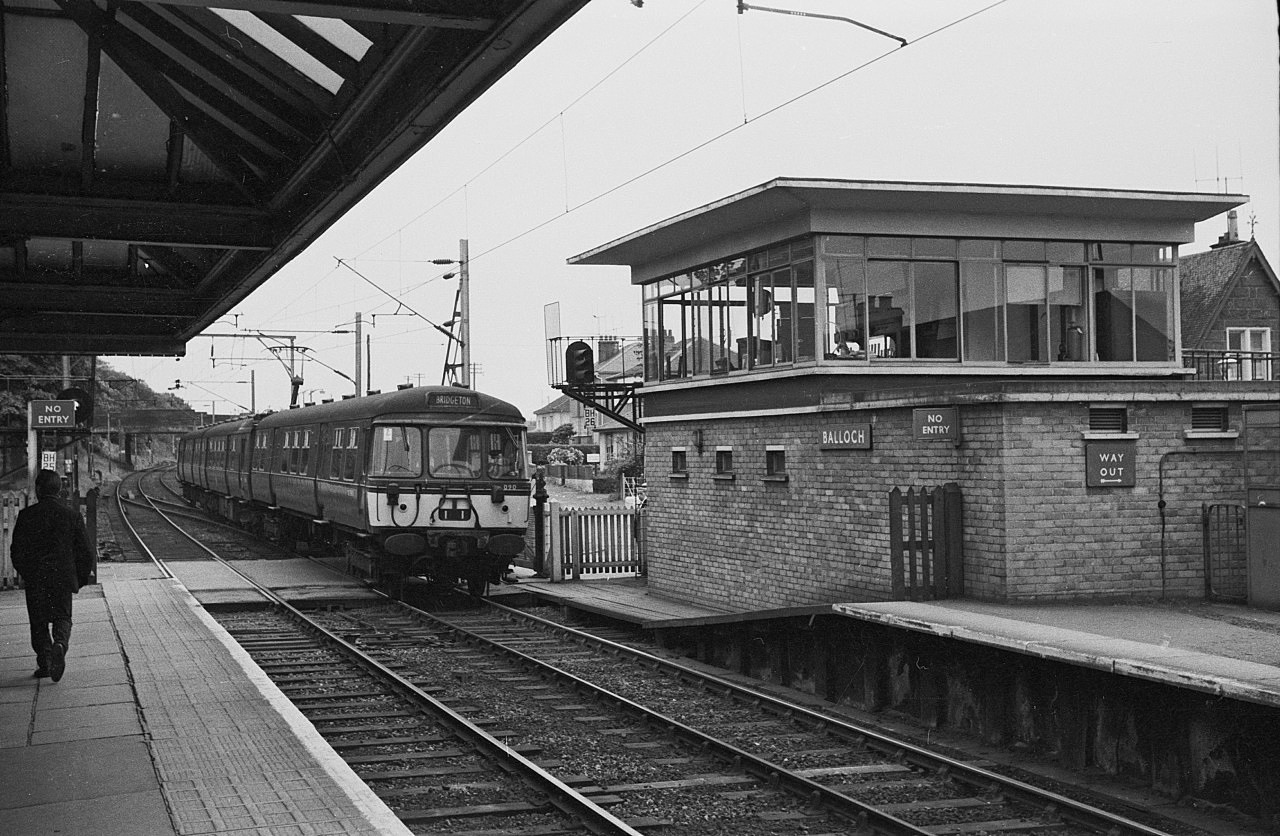
A Class 303 arriving at the station in 1965

For most of its passenger services, it was the terminal station. A few services, connecting with the steamer services to Tarbet and Inversnaid, continued to Balloch Pier. This pattern of service continued after electrification of the line in the 1960s. Between 1856 and 1934, it was served also by trains to/from Stirling over the Forth and Clyde Junction Railway. The main line from just north of Dalreoch Junction was singled in 1986 and thereafter all trains used the former southbound platform up until closure.

| Preceding station | Historical railways | Following station |
|---|---|---|
| Alexandria | CR & NBR; Caledonian and Dunbartonshire Junction Railway | Balloch Pier |

== Closure ==
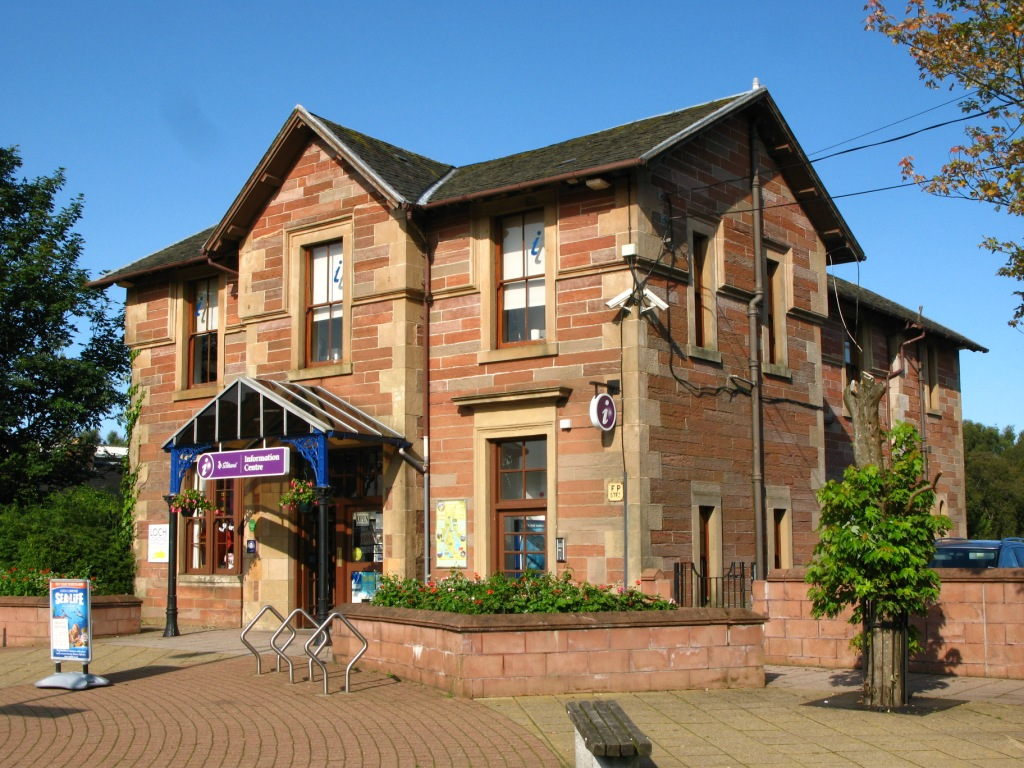
The former station building

The station was closed on 23 April 1988 and was replaced by Balloch station, situated immediately south of the level crossing. This relocation allowed the level crossing to be removed. The station building was formerly a tourist information centre until it closed in 2024. A section of platform survived until demolition in 2016.
