= Inverarnan =

Hamlet in Stirling, Scotland

Coordinates: 56.3285°N 4.7223°W

Inverarnan: Scottish Gaelic: Inbhir Àirnein
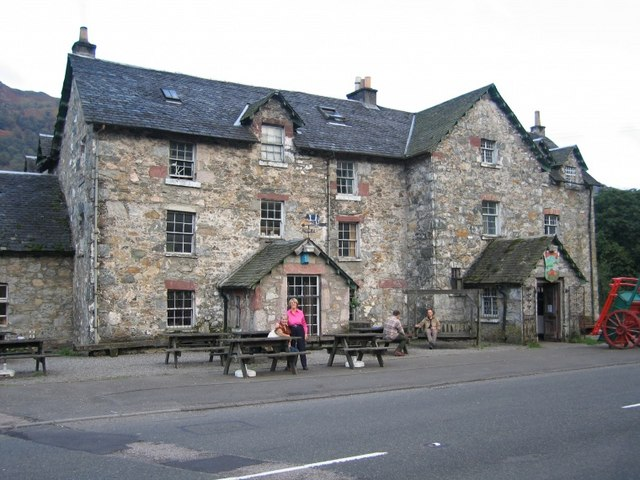
- The Drovers Inn

- Location within the Stirling council area
- OS grid reference: NN317184
- Council area: Stirling
- Lieutenancy area: Stirling and Falkirk
- Country: Scotland
- Sovereign state: United Kingdom
- Post town: Arrochar
- Postcode district: G83
- Police: Scotland
- Fire: Scottish
- Ambulance: Scottish
- UK Parliament: Stirling and Strathallan
- Scottish Parliament: Stirling

Inverarnan is a small hamlet in Stirling, Scotland, near the village of Crianlarich and the hamlet of Ardlui, Argyll and Bute. It is the only settlement in the historical county of Perthshire which has a G postcode.

== The Drovers Inn ==
The Drovers Inn is a hotel in Inverarnan. Established in 1705, it is known for being one of Scotland's most haunted pubs. In 2012, the pub was nearly shut down due to unpaid taxes.

== Inverarnan Canal ==
From 1844 until around the mid-1860s steamships called at Inverarnan via the short Inverarnan Canal that branched off the River Falloch.
