= Caledonian and Dumbartonshire Junction Railway =

Railway in West Dunbartonshire, Scotland

The Caledonian and Dumbartonshire Junction Railway (Note: the spelling Dumbartonshire was consistently used in official documentation in the 19th century, notwithstanding the later use of Dunbartonshire for the county.) (C&DJR) was a Scottish railway opened in 1850 between Bowling and Balloch via Dumbarton. The company had intended to build to Glasgow but it could not raise the money.

Other railways later reached Dumbarton, and the C&DJR was taken over by the larger Edinburgh and Glasgow Railway in 1862. It later became simply a branch of the larger North British Railway network.

When the rival Lanarkshire and Dumbartonshire Railway proposed a line to Balloch running close nearby, agreement was reached to make part of the former C&DJR line jointly owned, and this was done in 1896, forming the Dumbarton and Balloch Joint Railway.

Most of the original C&DJR line continues in use at the present day.

== History ==
=== Before authorisation ===
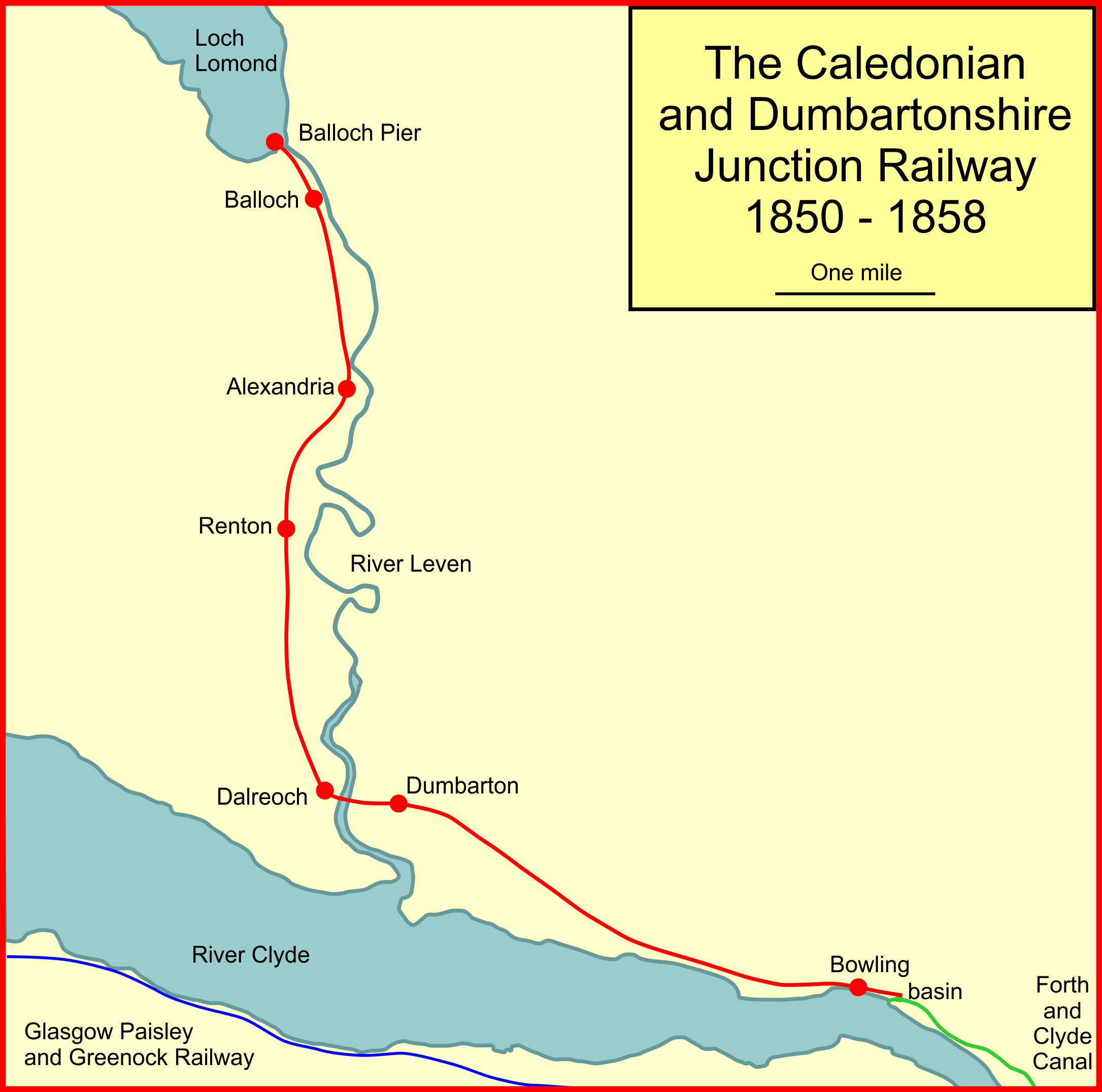
The Caledonian and Dumbartonshire Junction Railway

William Stirling established a textile dyeworks at Cordale, near Renton in the valley of the River Leven, in 1770. Other industrialists in textile finishing established nearby and the area between Balloch and Dumbarton quickly became a centre of the industry. Turkey red dye became a famous part of the textile industry.

Dumbarton had long been an important town on the road from the Western Highlands and Glasgow, and shipbuilding had developed into an important industry in the town.

The Edinburgh and Glasgow Railway (E&GR) had started operation in 1842, showing the advantages of an inter-urban railway line. There was a frenzy of railway promotion in the following years and in 1845 the Caledonian Railway along with many other Scottish lines obtained their acts of Parliament; a Scottish network was beginning to form. Seeing the benefit of a railway connection, in 1844 promoters put forward a scheme for a line from the E&GR line near Cowlairs, immediately north of Glasgow, to run through Dumbarton to Helensburgh and Balloch; from Cowlairs the line would make a broad sweep round the northern margin of Glasgow, approximately on the course of the later Cowlairs—Maryhill—Westerton—Dalmuir line.

=== Construction and opening ===
Caledonian and Dumbartonshire Junction Railway Act 1846
- Act of Parliament
- Parliament of the United Kingdom
- Long title: An Act for making a Railway from Glasgow to Dumbarton and Lochlomond, and with Branches to Helensburgh and other Places, to be called "The Caledonian and Dumbartonshire Junction Railway."
- Citation: 9 & 10 Vict. c. lxxxi

Dates
- Royal assent: 26 June 1846

On 26 June 1846 the Caledonian and Dumbartonshire Junction Railway (C&DJR) was authorised by the Caledonian and Dumbartonshire Junction Railway Act 1846 (9 & 10 Vict. c. lxxxi) to construct the line; The authorised share capital was £600,000, a considerable sum for the time.

The directors offered to lease their (unbuilt) line to the E&GR but this was refused. During the lengthy period of planning and then during the parliamentary hearings to obtain its own authorising act, the Caledonian had determined on an expansive scheme of bringing as many independent railways under its influence as possible. It considered the Caledonian and Dumbartonshire line to be a legitimate part of its future network, which it already referred to as "the Caledonian system". The Caledonian offered to lease the entire line at 5% on its capital. The lease would only become active when the C&DJR completed its line, and the priority for the C&DJR was raising capital at once to pay for the construction of its line. It decided to retain its independence.

Caledonian and Dumbartonshire Junction Railway (Deviation and Branches) Act 1847
- Act of Parliament
- Parliament of the United Kingdom
- Long title: An Act to enable the Caledonian and Dumbartonshire Junction Railway Company to make certain Deviations and Branches.
- Citation: 10 & 11 Vict. c. lxxxiii

Dates
- Royal assent: 2 July 1847

Text of statute as originally enacted

Nonetheless, as the original plan for a lease to the E&GR, and use of its Queen Street terminus in Glasgow, had fallen through, the C&DJR need a connection to the Caledonian and its Glasgow terminus, and the Caledonian was agreeable to this. Therefore, the following year the C&DJR obtained a further act of Parliament, the Caledonian and Dumbartonshire Junction Railway (Deviation and Branches) Act 1847 (10 & 11 Vict. c. lxxxiii), on 2 July 1847 authorising an extension to a terminal station at Port Dundas Road in Glasgow, and a short branch to connect with the Glasgow Garnkirk and Coatbridge Railway (successor to the Garnkirk and Glasgow Railway), which had agreed to lease its line to the Caledonian. This act authorised a further addition, of £50,000, to the capital of the company.

The acts of Parliament authorised the raising of share capital, but actually getting subscribers to hand over money was difficult, (although the Caledonian took an undercover shareholding of over £10,000, which with similar shareholdings in other proposed lines, later provoked a scandal). In fact only a total of £183,510 of capital was subscribed.

The little company was in serious financial difficulty; in the difficult money conditions following the frenzy of 1845 many subscribers defaulted on calls (Note: It was possible to subscribe for shares for a small deposit, and in the excitable market conditions of 1844–1845 many speculators later sold shares for far more than they had paid. When the bubble burst, many shareholders found that they could not afford to pay the periodical "calls" for further payments on their shareholding; they forfeited the shares and the company was unable to get the money to let contracts for construction.) and the company cut back their proposed railway to run from Bowling to Balloch only. Even so, only half of the necessary money was forthcoming (£36,000 of £72,000 for the reduced scheme).

The railway was saved when George and James Burns, successful operators of steamboats, agreed to take a lease of the railway in security for a large cash injection. As well as enabling building of the line, they directly built piers at Balloch and on the Clyde at Bowling, enabling efficient transfer of goods and passengers from Glasgow down the Clyde to and from the railway. Bowling was at the western extremity of the Forth and Clyde Canal, which gave access to the industries of the northern margins of Glasgow and to Edinburgh; the railway was built to the canal basin for exchange of goods; the Bowling passenger and goods station was a short distance to the west, close to the Clyde pier.

The line opened for traffic on 15 July 1850. (Note: Awdry (1990), p. 121 says "The line ran between Glasgow and Bowling, opening from Dumbarton on 15 July 1850." This is obviously a mistake; the line ran west from Bowling, not east.)

Perhaps conceding that the physical connection to the Caledonian Railway had not been achieved, the company's publicity at the time referred to the Dumbartonshire Railway.

=== In operation ===
The little railway did surprisingly well, thanks to the Burns Brothers' efforts. Eight fast sailings daily operated from Glasgow to Bowling, connecting with trains there, and a 90-minute journey from Glasgow reached Loch Lomond. Day excursions to Loch Lomond became immensely popular as the notion of tourism developed, and 600 tourists from Edinburgh visited Loch Lomond in a single day, by the E&GR, Clyde steamer, and the C&DJR. Coal from the Monkland pits was brought to Bowling on the Forth and Clyde Canal, substantially reducing costs in the area served by the railway and on Loch Lomondside. Steamer connections on the Loch reached Inverarnan at the foot of Glen Falloch and it was possible to reach Oban from Glasgow in a day (by coach from Inverarnan).

=== The Glasgow, Dumbarton and Helensburgh Railway ===
The attraction of connecting Glasgow to Dumbarton by railway, and of bringing Helensburgh into the railway system, was powerful, and the C&DJR line simply ran from the Forth and Clyde Canal basin at Bowling to Balloch. It fell to the promoters of the Glasgow, Dumbarton and Helensburgh Railway (GD&HR), to close the gaps; the authorising act of Parliament for the line, the Glasgow, Dumbarton and Helensburgh Railway Act 1855 (18 & 19 Vict. c. cxc), was granted on 15 August 1855. The capital of this line was £240,000, less than half of the intended C&DJR capital. The line ran from the Edinburgh and Glasgow line at Cowlairs, via Maryhill, Dalmuir and Kilpatrick to Bowling (substantially following the intended route of the C&DJR), and from Dalreoch to Cardross and Helensburgh. It opened on 31 May 1858. A revenue-sharing agreement was finalised between the C&DJR, the GD&HR and the E&GR. The line was worked by the Edinburgh and Glasgow Railway.

The GD&HR paid the Caledonian and Dumbartonshire half the original cost of the River Leven bridge in Dumbarton.

There was a management committee which may have controlled both railways (C&DJR and GD&HR) as a single entity (as opposed to merely apportioning income and costs); Awdry (1990) refers to the Dumbartonshire Railways, a "joint maintenance committee".

=== The Edinburgh and Glasgow Railway takes over ===
Edinburgh and Glasgow and Dumbartonshire Railways Amalgamation Act 1862
- Act of Parliament
- Parliament of the United Kingdom
- Long title: An Act to amalgamate the Caledonian and Dumbartonshire Junction Railway Company with the Edinburgh and Glasgow Railway Company.
- Citation: 25 & 26 Vict. c. cxxxv

Dates
- Royal assent: 7 July 1862

Text of statute as originally enacted

The Edinburgh and Glasgow Railway (E&GR) was working the two lines, and an obvious next step was to absorb them. The E&GR did so by the Edinburgh and Glasgow and Dumbartonshire Railways Amalgamation Act 1862 (25 & 26 Vict. c. cxxxv) on 14 August 1862. The E&GR was itself absorbed into the North British Railway system on 1 August 1865.

The C&DJR had found its original destiny by joining with the GD&HR, and tourism developed as the public started to enjoy the landscape of Loch Lomond. Ordinary passenger and goods traffic too was healthy. The line was now simply a branch line feeding the trunk routes of the North British Railway.

=== The Lanarkshire and Dumbartonshire Railway ===
That status as a worthy but unexciting backwater was changed somewhat in 1889, when the promoters of a nominally independent Dumbarton, Jamestown and Loch Lomond Railway proposed a line up the east side of the Leven to Aber Bay, near Ross Priory on Loch Lomond. Then in 1890 a proposed Lanarkshire and Dumbartonshire Railway (L&DR) was announced, to run from Glasgow to Dumbarton and join the Dumbarton, Jamestown and Loch Lomond Railway there. The L&DR would serve many industrial sites in the shipbuilding areas of the north shore of the Clyde and it was heavily supported by industrialists. By running round the north of Glasgow to join the line out of Buchanan Street the L&DR would link in the Caledonian Railway network for goods and minerals, and the Glasgow Central Railway would be connected too, giving through journeys across the city.

On 5 August 1891 the Lanarkshire and Dumbartonshire Railway got its authorising act of Parliament, the Lanarkshire and Dumbartonshire Railway Act 1891 (54 & 55 Vict. c. cci). On the same day the North British Railway (NBR) obtained an act of Parliament, the North British Railway (General Powers) Act 1891 (54 & 55 Vict. c. cciii), for improved access to industrial sites in the Vale of Leven; this had been an unsuccessful attempt to frustrate the L&DR scheme, which included the competitive line up the Vale of Leven. The Lanarkshire and Dumbartonshire Railway Act 1891 was "a triumph for the Caledonian" (as sponsor of the L&DR).

Dumbarton and Balloch Joint Line, &c. Act 1892
- Act of Parliament
- Parliament of the United Kingdom
- Long title: An Act to give effect to certain Agreements between the Caledonian North British and Lanarkshire and Dumbartonshire Railway Companies and to confer powers on them with respect to joint, ownership of the Railway between Dumbarton and Balloch and the Pier at Balloch and the joint acquisition and working of Steamboats on Loch Lomond and other matters to authorise the construction of certain Railways and Works at or near Dumbarton and for other purposes.
- Citation: 55 & 56 Vict. c. clxx

Dates
- Royal assent: 27 June 1892

However, there was considerable shareholder opposition to the expensive duplication, and also local people objected. In the following parliamentary session therefore, a compromise was reached, in which the Dumbarton to Balloch line of the North British Railway would be transferred to joint status, with the L&DR and the Caledonian also sharing the management of the line. This was not to the liking of the NBR but it was forced to acquiesce, and the arrangement was ratified by the Dumbarton and Balloch Joint Line, &c. Act 1892 (55 & 56 Vict. c. clxx), which gained authorisation on 27 June 1892. When the L&DR completed its line to Dumbarton, the onward route to Balloch would be transferred to Joint Railway status.

=== The Dumbarton and Balloch Joint Railway ===
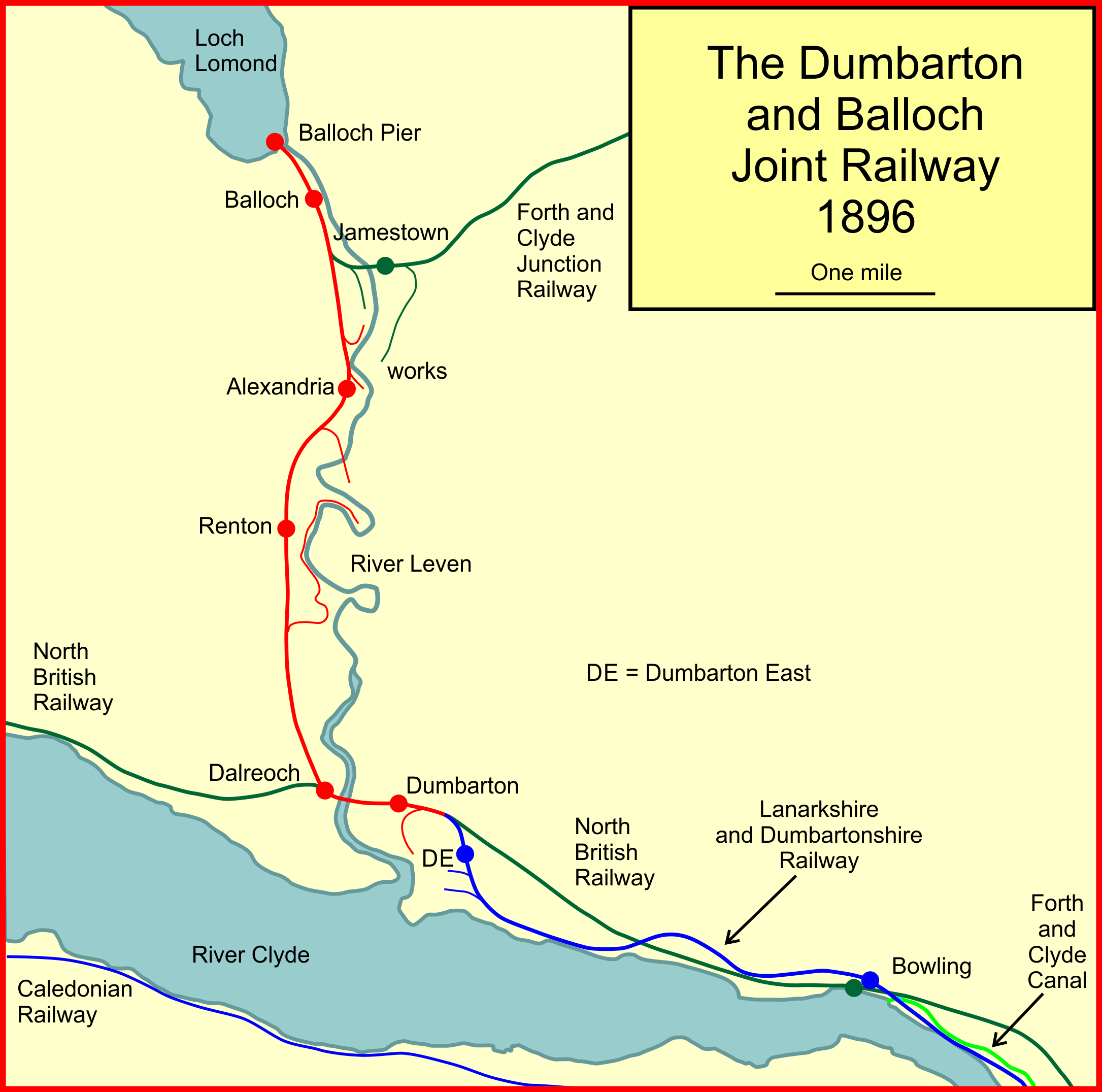
The Dumbarton and Balloch Joint Railway

In fact the L&DR took some time to reach Dumbarton; it did so (to Dumbarton East Junction) on 15 June 1896 and the Dumbarton and Balloch Joint Railway was established from 1 October 1896, jointly managed by the North British Railway (NBR), the Caledonian Railway (CR) and the Lanarkshire and Dumbartonshire Railway. Railway operated pleasure steamers on Loch Lomond also transferred to the joint company; the NBR received £30,000 for them.

The steamers had been operated by the North British Steam Packet Company, and the steamers in service were Prince of Wales (built 1858), Prince Consort (built 1862), and Empress (built 1888). The two older vessels were due for replacement, but a disagreement about the specification for their replacements resulted in a delay until 1899, when Prince George and Princess May entered service. The steamers were lavish and there was an excellent service to points on Loch Lomond, with good connections to the trains at Balloch Pier.

The new joint railway was of course a section of the line of the earlier GD&HR. (The part from Bowling to Dumbarton Junction now remained with the North British Railway.) There were over eleven miles of siding on the seven-mile route, indicating the industrial character of the area.

Both the NBR and the CR were anxious to run smartly timed passenger trains from Balloch to Glasgow for residential season ticket holders, and the single line from Balloch limited the extent to which this was possible. Weekly residential travel was encouraged, as some people lived at the weekend at Lomondside resorts and travelled into Glasgow on Monday morning. However this practice declined over the years and by 1922 only one Mondays-only train left Balloch Pier. By 1922 the NBR service between Balloch and Dumbarton was very limited. (Note: Many trains shown as running between Balloch and Dumbarton only in the NBR table in Bradshaw for 1922 in fact continue to Glasgow on the Caledonian route.)

The enhanced access to the industry of the Leven Valley, promised by the NBR, was provided in the years following the 1892 act. At this period the dyeworks industries (printing textiles) was vigorous, and there were extensive sidings on both sides of the line, but especially between the line and the Leven, and also in Dumbarton itself.

=== Later history ===
On 1 August 1909 the L&DR was absorbed by the Caledonian Railway. As the Dumbarton and Balloch Joint Railway had been owned and managed in equal shares by the Caledonian, the L&DR and the NBR, the Caledonian now had a two-thirds share in the line and the steamers.

From 1923 the main line railways of Great Britain were "grouped" following the Railways Act 1921. The Caledonian Railway was a constituent of the new London, Midland and Scottish Railway and the North British Railway was a constituent of the new London and North Eastern Railway. The two large companies continued to compete for traffic to Balloch and the joint status of the Dumbarton and Balloch Joint Railway continued.

In 1948 the railways were nationalised, and the line became simply a part of the Scottish Region of British Railways. The two routes from Balloch to Glasgow continued in a sort of internal competition, with more than twenty daily trains on the former Caledonian route and about 16 on the former NBR route. Only a limited number of trains ran as far as Balloch Pier, and the weekend peak of journeys was no longer in existence, as throughout transport by road from Loch Lomondside settlements and farms became increasingly dominant.

In 1960 electric trains started running on the line between Glasgow and Balloch and Helensburgh. They operated on the former NBR route, except that between Dunglass and Dumbarton Junction the Caledonian line was used. Dunglass was a short distance west of Bowling and the two routes came close together there; a new connection was laid in. A skeleton service of the new electric trains started on Saturday 5 November 1960, with a full service from the following day. On 13 December a serious explosion occurred in the guard's compartment of a train at Renton. This was followed by other serious problems and the electric service was taken off. Steam trains resumed (although some steam engines had been taken out of service permanently). The normal electric service was finally resumed on 1 October 1961.

Steam trains continued running (as a planned arrangement) throughout the Caledonian route until 1964, when that line was closed.

Use of Balloch Pier station declined heavily in the following years, and for some years there was no timetabled passenger service, although the line remained available for excursion traffic. The last passenger trains operated in September 1986.

At the present day electric passenger trains run from Balloch to Glasgow and beyond, on a broadly half-hourly interval service, operated by ScotRail.

=== The Maid of the Loch ===
From the earliest days steamers on Loch Lomond had operated in connection with the trains, and for much of the period were owned by one or other of the railways.

In 1953 PS Maid of the Loch started operation: the largest vessel built for inland waterway operation in Britain, and the last paddle steamer to be built in Britain. Because of her size, she was assembled on the loch. She ceased operation on the loch in 1981.

== Stations ==
The locations on the Caledonian and Dumbartonshire Junction Railway were:

- Bowling canal basin (goods);
- Bowling; an 1850 advertisement reproduced in Noble refers to the location as Bowling Bay; resited 31 May 1858 when the line to Glasgow opened;
- Dumbarton; a new station was provided 31 May 1858; extended 1896 for the joint line;
- Dalreoch; in timetables for the first time in May 1852;
- Renton;
- Alexandria;
- Forth and Clyde Junction; convergence of line from Drymen (from 1856);
- Balloch;
- Balloch Pier.

The locations on the Dumbarton and Balloch Joint Railway were:

- Dumbarton Junction; convergence of Lanarkshire and Dumbartonshire Railway and North British Railway;
- Dumbarton Central;
- Dalreoch; divergence of North British Railway line to Helensburgh;
- Renton;
- Alexandria; between 1935 and 1962 the station was named Alexandria and Bonhill;
- Forth and Clyde Junction; convergence of line from Drymen (until 1934);
- Balloch; renamed Balloch Central in 1962; relocated south of Balloch Road to eliminate level crossing use, and renamed Balloch on 29 September 1986;
- Balloch Pier; closed 29 September 1986.

All of these stations are still in use except Bowling (L&DR station) and Balloch Pier.

== Connections to other lines ==
- Forth and Clyde Junction Railway at Forth and Clyde Junction
- Glasgow, Dumbarton and Helensburgh Railway at Dalreoch Junction and Bowling
- Lanarkshire and Dunbartonshire Railway at Dumbarton Joint Line Junction and Bowling Link Line

== Sources ==
- Awdry, Christopher (1990). Encyclopaedia of British Railway Companies. Sparkford: Patrick Stephens Ltd. ISBN 1-8526-0049-7. OCLC 19514063. CN 8983.
- Jowett, Alan (March 1989). Jowett's Railway Atlas of Great Britain and Ireland: From Pre-Grouping to the Present Day (1st ed.). Sparkford: Patrick Stephens Ltd. ISBN 978-1-85260-086-0. OCLC 22311137.
- Railscot on the Caledonian and Dumbartonshire Junction Railway
