= Balloch Pier railway station =

Disused railway station in Scotland

Balloch Pier
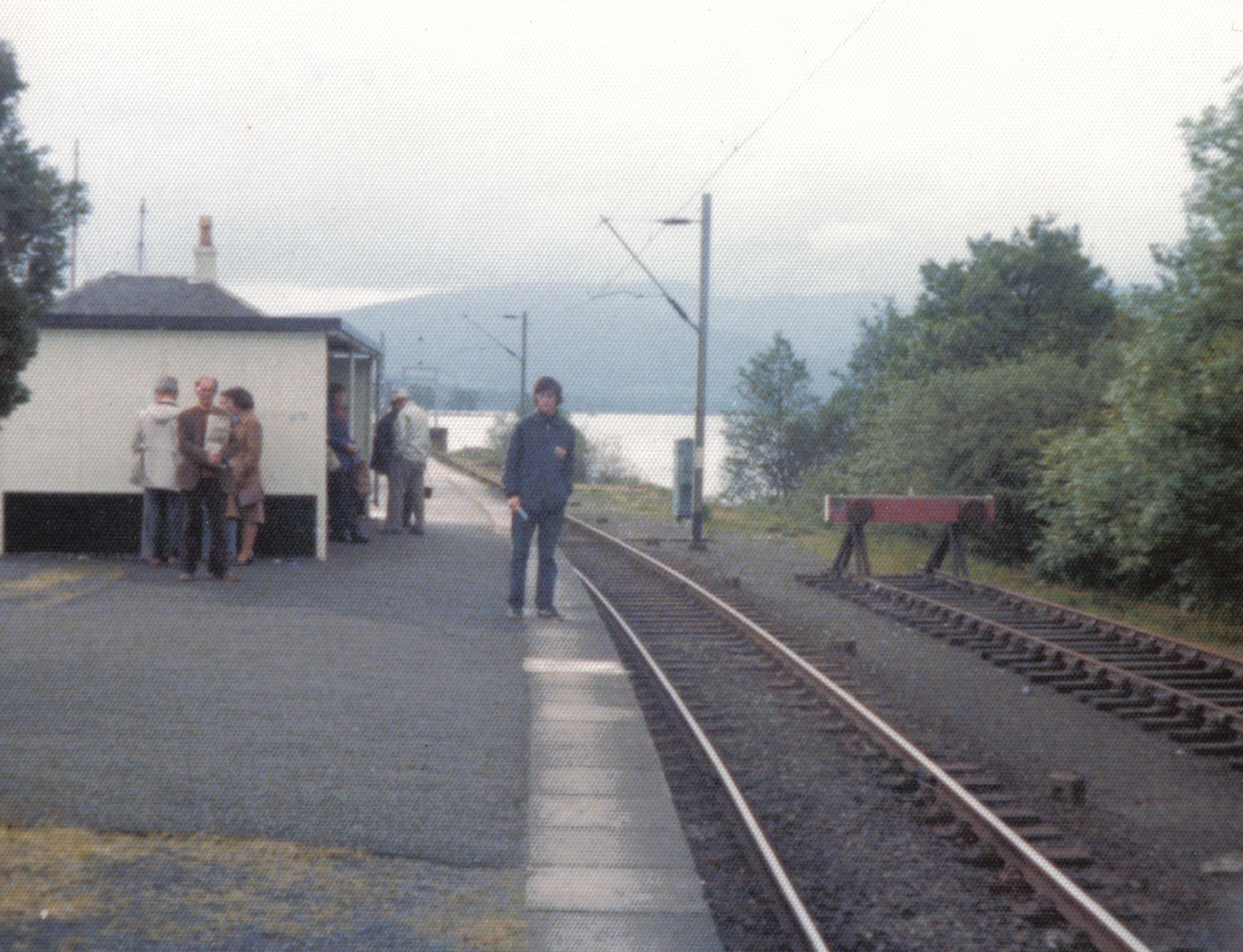
- Balloch Pier station in 1976

General information
- Location: Balloch, West Dunbartonshire; Scotland
- Coordinates: 56.007877°N 4.5897°W
- Line: North Clyde Line
- Platforms: 2

Other information
- Status: Disused

History
- Original company: Caledonian and Dumbartonshire Junction Railway
- Pre-grouping: Caledonian Railway & North British Railway
- Post-grouping: London Midland and Scottish Railway & London and North Eastern Railway

Key dates
- 15 July 1850: Opened
- 28 September 1986: Closed
Location

Balloch Pier railway station was a railway station serving the southern end of Loch Lomond on the northern edge of Balloch, Scotland.

In 1960 the North Clyde Line was electrified, with Balloch Pier being electrified at 25 kV 50 Hz AC, using the Class 303 'Blue Train' EMU stock.

It was closed on 28 September 1986 as a result of the 1984 Strathclyde Rail Review. The steamer service on Loch Lomond provided by the PS Maid of the Loch had ceased in 1981. Rail services had been provided to connect with sailings.

Following closure the station was demolished and there is now a car park on the site.

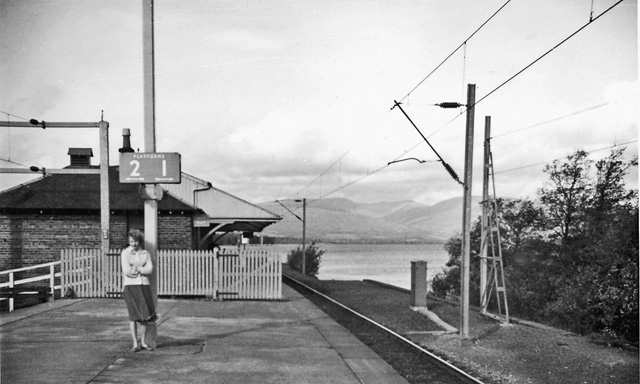
The station in 1961

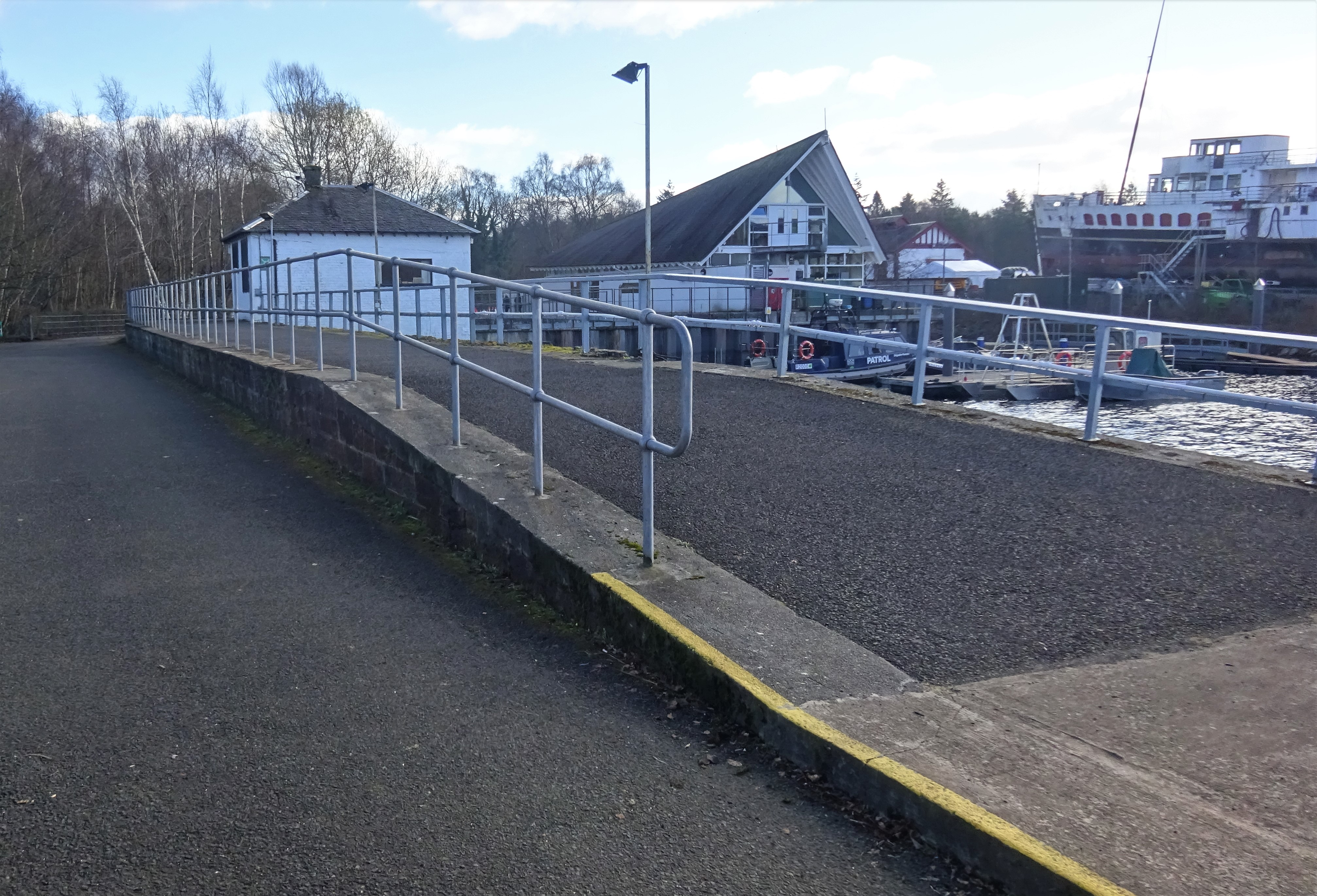
The former station platform in 2023, looking south

Preceding station	Historical railways	Following station
Balloch Central	CR & NBR; Caledonian and Dunbartonshire Junction Railway	Terminus
