= West Loch Lomond Cycle Path =

Cycle path in Scotland

The West Loch Lomond Cycle Path is a cycle path that runs from Arrochar and Tarbet railway station, at the upper end of Loch Lomond in Scotland, to Balloch railway station, at the bottom of the loch. It was officially opened on 20 June 2006 by Tavish Scott, when he was Minister for Transport and Telecommunications.

The path is about 28 km (17 mi) long and runs along the west bank of Loch Lomond, between the west bank of the loch and the busy A82 road.

== The route ==
From Arrochar & Tarbet Station (56.2028°N 4.7212°W) the path runs left and down a hill to a tourist information office by the loch. The path then continues on the pavement of the A82 for several miles. For the remainder of its length the path runs either alongside the road, or between the road and the loch.

Much of the path runs directly alongside the A82, and the rest is not very far away. The golf courses and commercial developments along the side of the loch further push parts of the path away from the banks of Loch Lomond.

The path ends at Balloch railway station for trains to Glasgow (56.0028°N 4.5836°W). The 34 km (21 mi) long Loch Lomond to Glasgow Cycleway starts close to the station and runs to the Scottish Exhibition and Conference Centre by the Clyde in central Glasgow.

== Access to the path ==
There are railway stations at each end of the West Loch Lomond Cycle Path, but none along its length. The Oban/Mallaig railway service runs from Glasgow Queen Street station to Arrochar & Tarbet station. The train goes up the shores of Gare Loch; passing Faslane Naval Base (aka HMS Neptune), the home of the United Kingdom's fleet of Trident nuclear submarines. Trains from Balloch connect to Glasgow's Central and Queen Street stations.

== Photographs ==
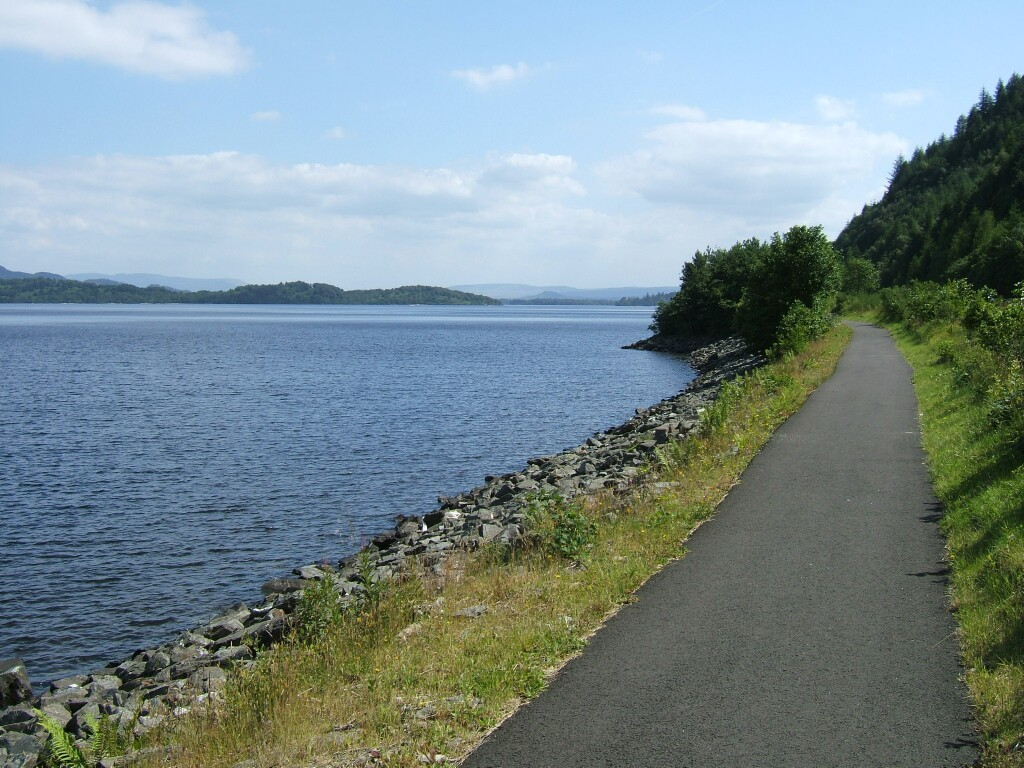

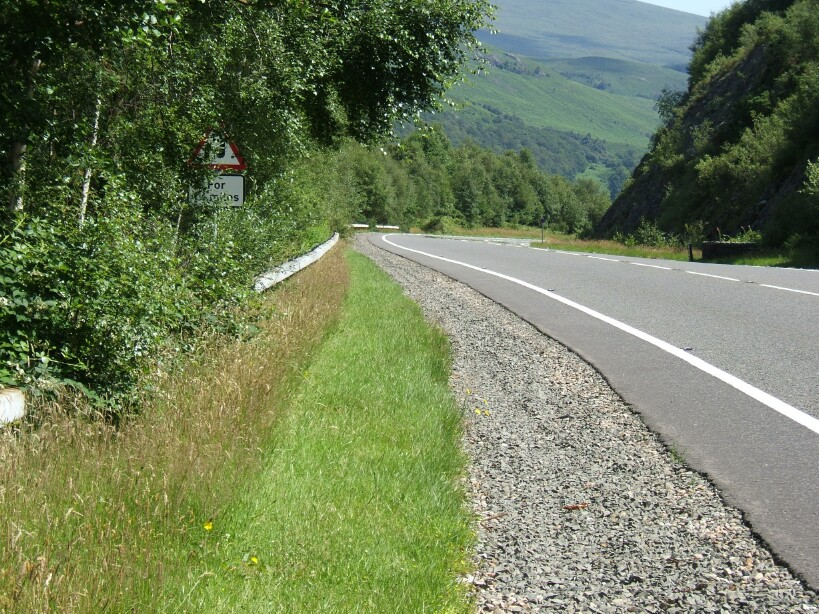
