= PS Maid of the Loch =

Clyde-built paddle steamer (1953 - now)

Coordinates: 56.008663°N 4.591872°W

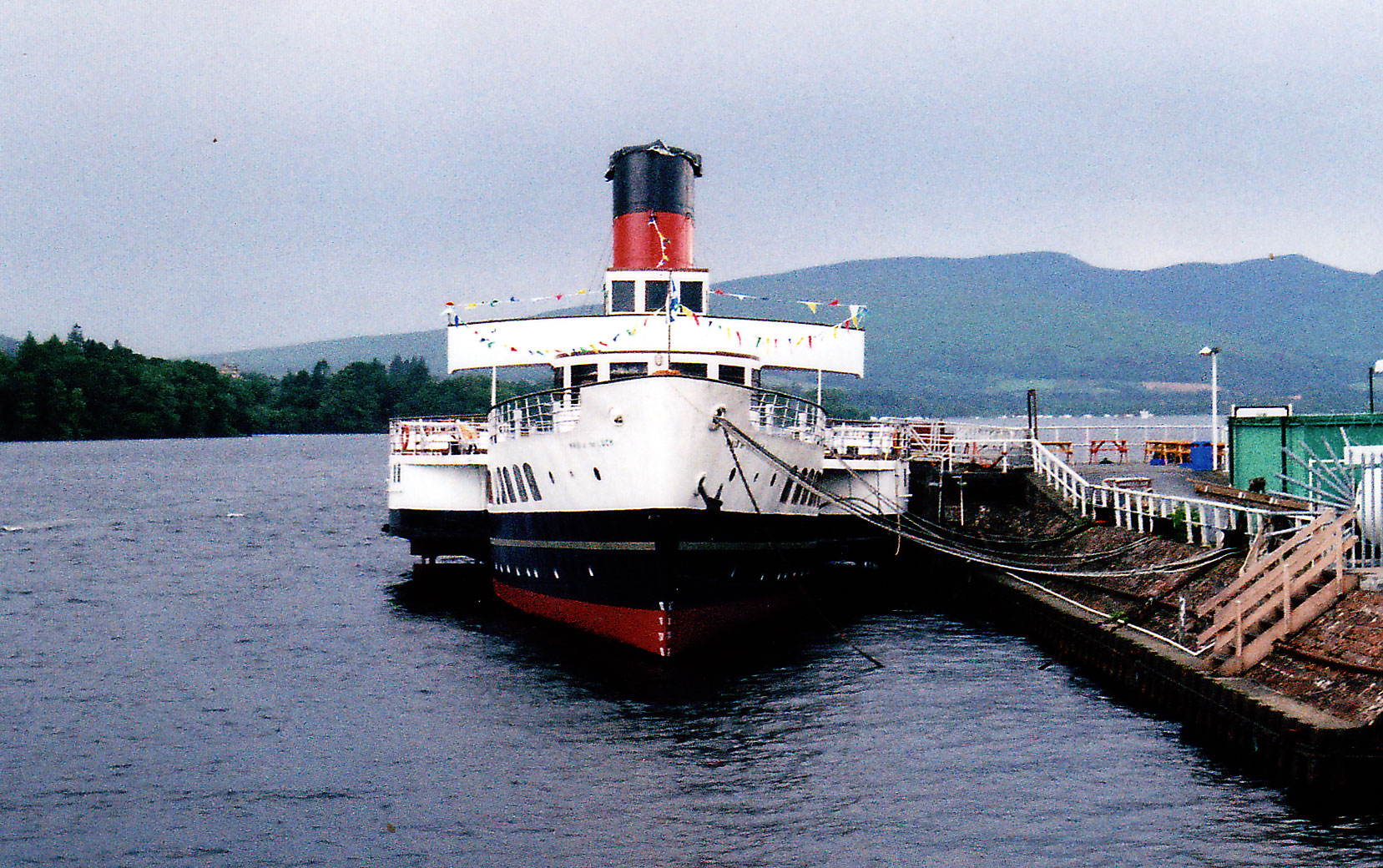
- PS Maid of the Loch at the pier at Balloch, Loch Lomond where she is undergoing restoration.

History

United Kingdom
- Name: Maid of the Loch
- Owner: British Transport Commission (1953–1981); Loch Lomond Steamship Company (1995–present)
- Operator: Caledonian Steam Packet Company
- Route: Loch Lomond
- Builder: A. & J. Inglis of Pointhouse, Glasgow
- Yard number: 1474P
- Launched: 5 March 1953
- In service: 25 May 1953
- Out of service: 31 August 1981
- Home port: Balloch
- Identification: IMO number: 5217567
- Status: UK Designated Vessels List; Static exhibit; under restoration
- Notes: Last paddle steamer built in a Clyde shipyard

General characteristics
- Type: Passenger paddle steamer
- Tonnage: 555 GRT
- Length: 208 feet (63 m)
- Beam: 51 feet (16 m)
- Draught: 4 ft 6 in (1.37 m)
- Installed power: 900 ihp (670 kW)
- Propulsion: Steam, compound diagonal engines by Rankin & Blackmore, Greenock
- Speed: 13.75 knots (25.47 km/h; 15.82 mph)
- Capacity: Passengers: 1,000

PS Maid of the Loch is the last paddle steamer built in the United Kingdom. She operated on Loch Lomond for 29 years. As of 2022, she was being restored near Balloch pier.

She is presently on the slipway near Balloch Pier undergoing extensive repairs to her hull, complete paddle restoration and will be coated in her original livery of white, green waterline and buff coloured funnel before being launched again into Loch Lomond. While under restoration, the Maid of the Loch has been open to the public every Saturday and Sunday Easter to October, and closed throughout the winter.

== Construction ==
Maid of the Loch is the last of a long line of Loch Lomond steamers that began about 1816, within four years of Henry Bell's pioneering passenger steamboat service on the River Clyde. In 1950 the British Transport Commission, owner of the newly nationalised railways, made the decision to replace the Princess May and Prince Edward with a new paddle steamer, to be the largest inland waterway vessel ever in Britain.

Maid of the Loch was built by A. & J. Inglis of Glasgow, launched on 5 March 1953, and entered service later that year. She is a "knock down" ship: that is, after assembly at the shipyard she was dismantled, and shipped to the loch by rail to Balloch at the south end of the loch, and there the sections were reassembled on a purpose built slipway. The tonnage measures 555 gross register tons (GRT), and the length is 208 feet (63 m). The two-cylinder compound diagonal steam engine is less advanced than had the more usual type installed on steamers such as the PS Waverley, but was considered suitable for the limited area of operations.

Maid of the Loch was painted white with a buff funnel. She was initially operated by the Caledonian Steam Packet Company. In later years she had a series of owners.

== Services ==
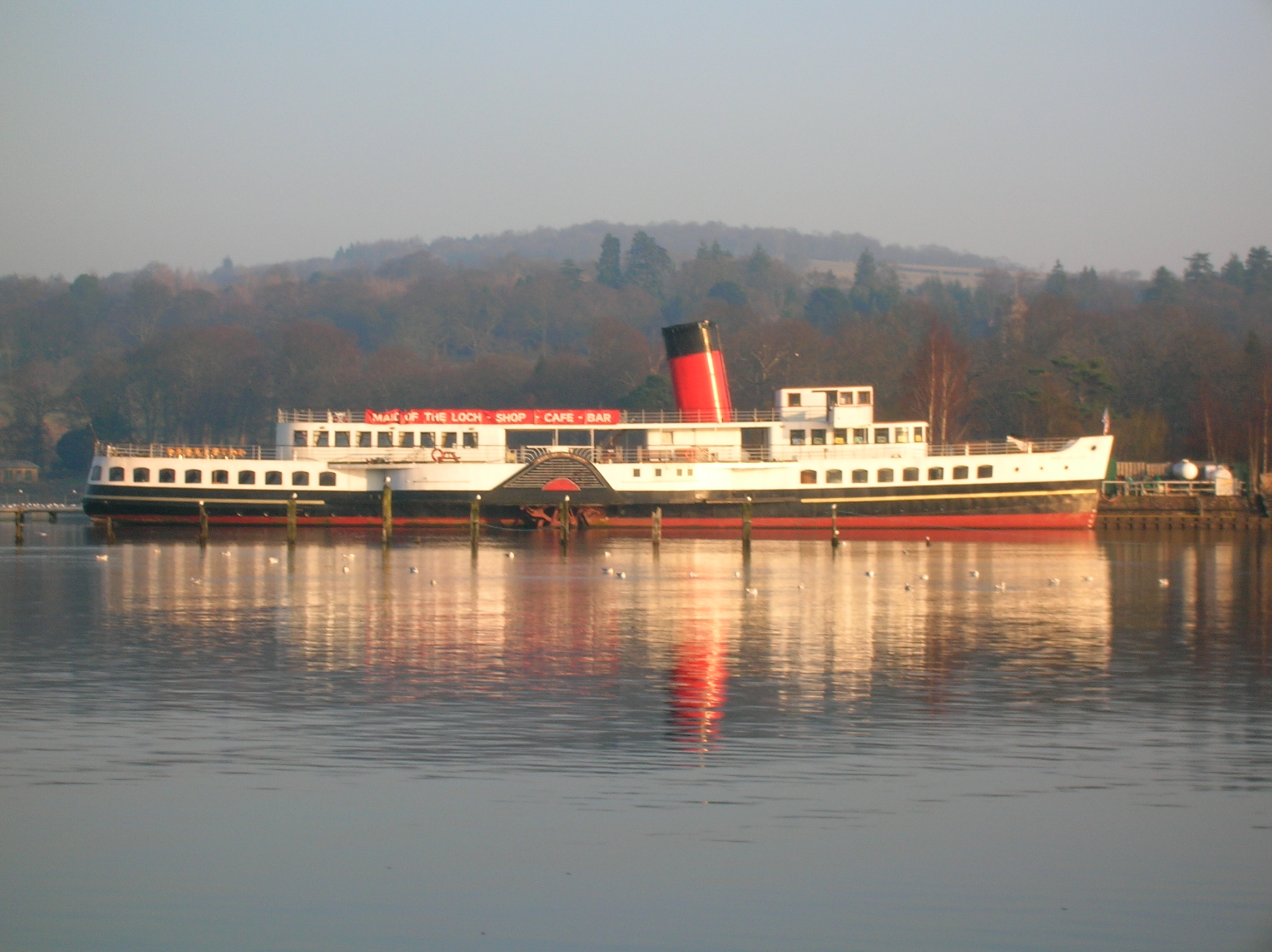
Maid of the Loch at Balloch Pier in 2007

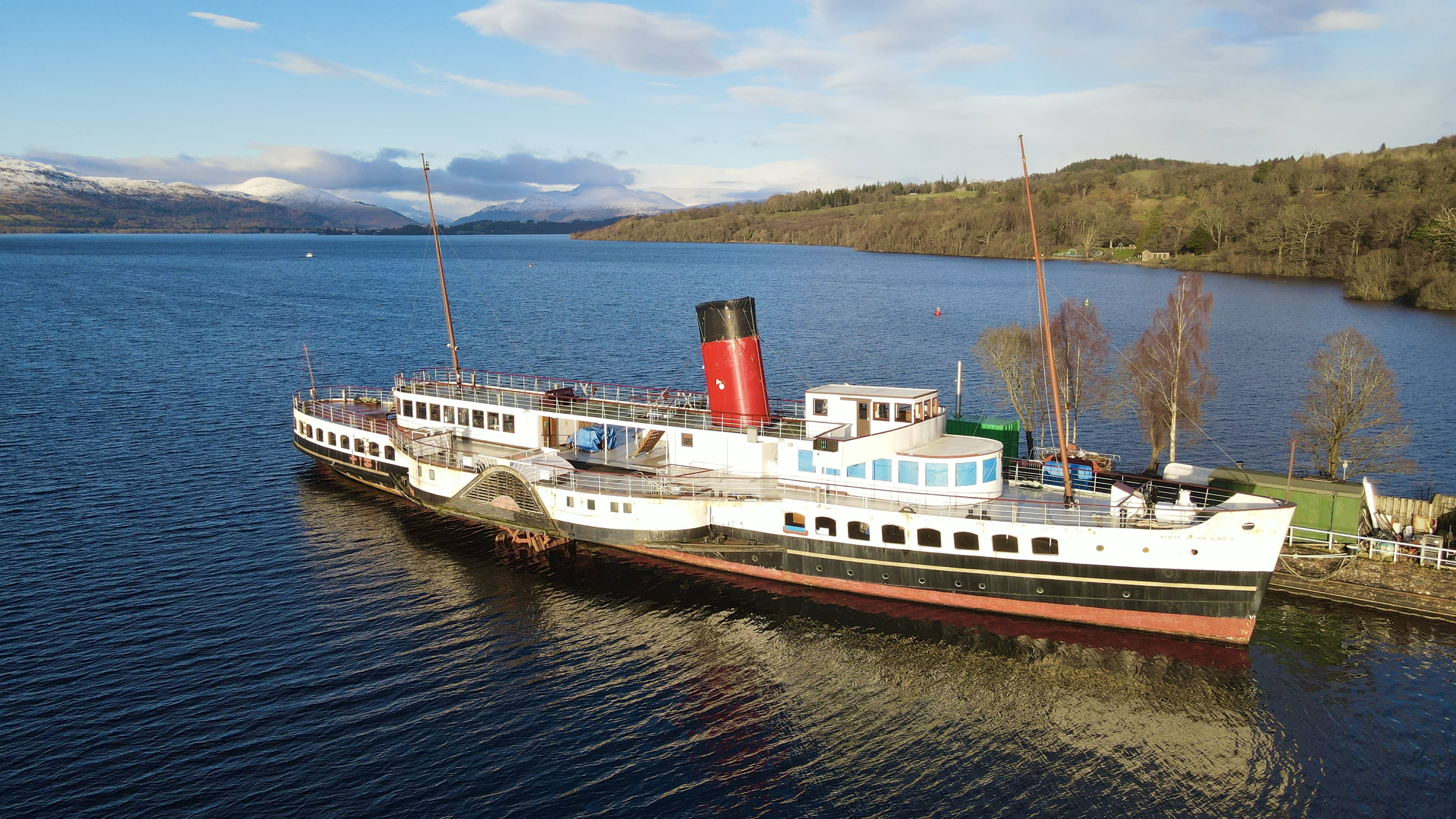
Maid of the Loch at Balloch Pier in 2020

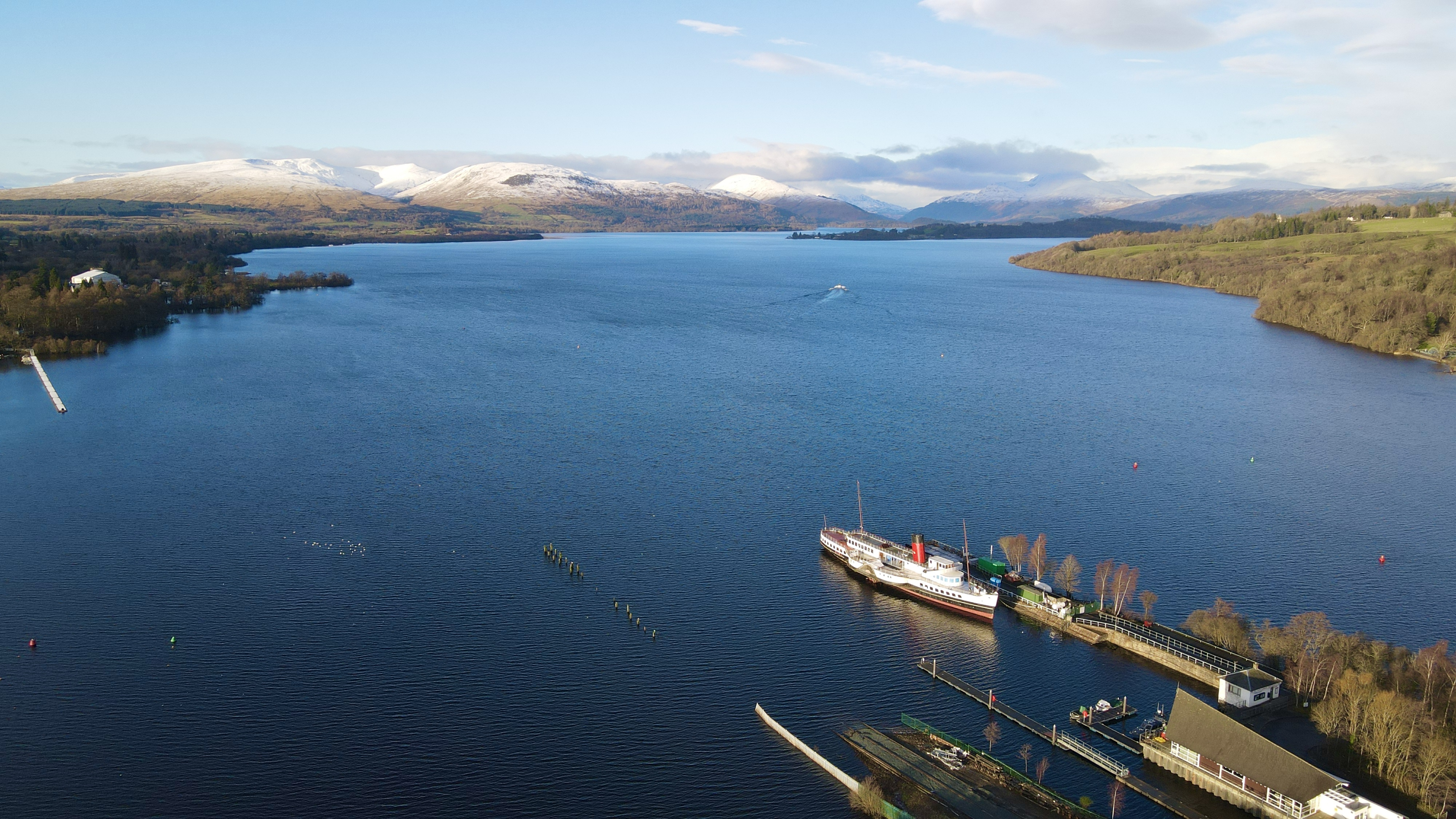
Views of Loch Lomond, with the Maid at Balloch Pier in 2020

Maid of the Loch provided a service from Balloch pier, initially to Ardlui at the north end of the loch, but later her last call was a few miles short of this at Inversnaid and she would cruise to the head of the loch. She was transferred to the Scottish Transport Group in 1969; then in 1973 to Caledonian MacBrayne.

As with other steamers, cost pressures led to her being laid up after a last commercial sailing on 31 August 1981. One problem was that some of the piers on the loch would become unusable, either because of poor state of repair, or silting making the area around them too shallow; some of these piers had not been built to take a vessel as large as the Maid of the Loch. A series of attempts to return the vessel to service under a succession of owners was unsuccessful, and she presented a sad sight gradually deteriorating at the side of the loch.

== Restoration ==
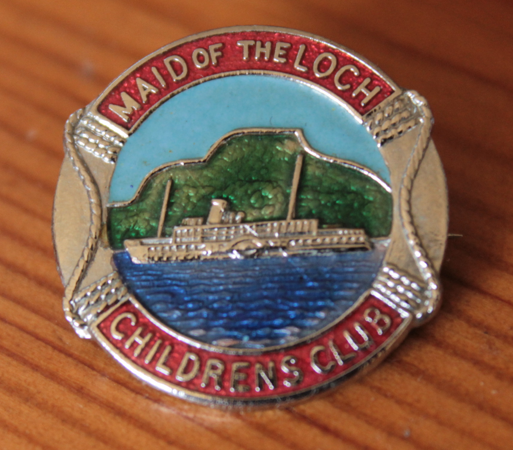
Maid of the Loch Children's Club badge 1970

In 1992 Dumbarton District Council bought the Maid of the Loch and restoration work started. In 1995 the Council supported a group of local enthusiasts in setting up a charitable organisation, the Loch Lomond Steamship Company, to take over ownership and carry on restoration. She became ready for static operation with a cafe/bar and function suite in autumn 2000.

The key to the restoration was the repair and refurbishment of the slipway adjacent to the pier at Balloch. There not being any connection to the sea it was not possible to take the ship to a dry dock for repairs to the hull so a slipway with a steam-operated cable-hauled cradle had been built. This had fallen into disrepair by the 1990s and eventually a Heritage Lottery Fund grant was awarded along with assistance from Scottish Enterprise Dunbartonshire, and West Dunbartonshire Council. This enabled the paddle steamer to be lifted out of the water on 27 June 2006.

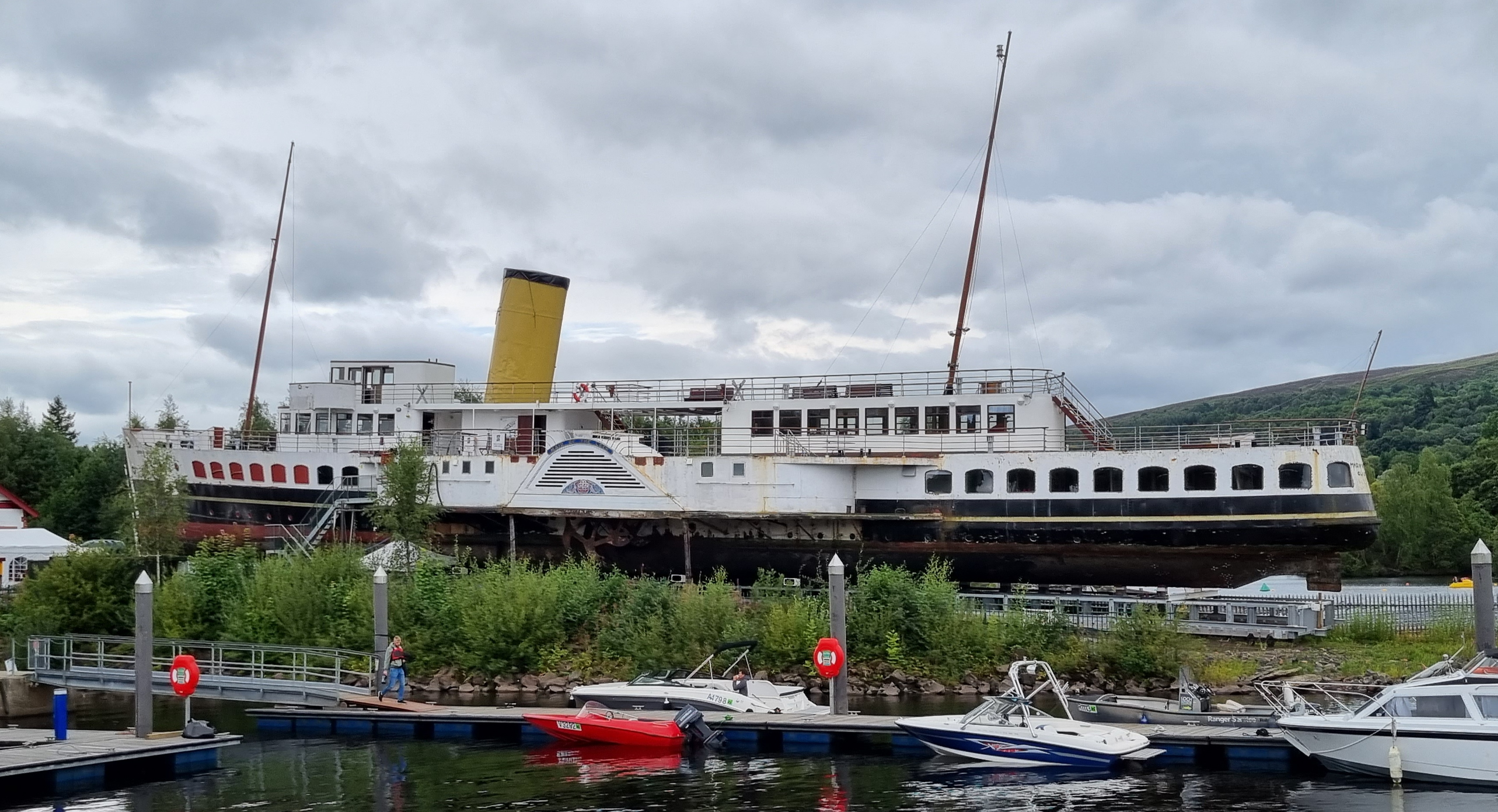
The Maid laid up on the slipway during restoration beside Balloch Pier in 2023

Fundraising continued for the next stages of the restoration including donations from the Wolfson Foundation, the Paddle Steamer Preservation Society and £950,000 from the Scottish Government's Regeneration Capital Grant Fund, amongst others. There had been the suggestion that if Loch Lomond Steamship Company raised £1.7 million by June 2018, that the Heritage Lottery Fund would donate £3.8 million towards the restoration, however in September 2018 it was announced that the Heritage Lottery Fund had decided against this donation.

In January 2019 an unsuccessful attempt was made to winch the Maid of the Loch out of the water onto her slipway but the ship snapped its ties and slid back into the loch, however a second attempt in July 2021 with a new carriage was successful. Restoration work continued on the ship, with her interiors being returned to their original 1950s appearance while adding modern conveniences such as a lift between decks, and also enabling her engines and paddles to turn slowly fed by a package boiler mounted on the pier.

In 2019 the project was set back due to the failed bid to the National Lottery Fund. However, it received £950k from the Scottish Government and £50k from the Paddle Steamer Preservation Society. This funding was used as described above. The charity built a new, more robust Slipway carriage using funds supplied by a variety of sources, most notably, Historic Environment Scotland as the slipway and the Steam Winch House form a Category A listed structure.

== Bibliography ==
- Cleary, Robert (1979). Maid of the Loch. Gourock: Caledonian MacBrayne.
- Brown, Alan (2000) Loch Lomond Passenger Steamers 1818 - 1989 129pp. Contains a substantial section on the Maid of the Loch, including details of the ownership changes up to 1996, with 17 photographs of the 'Maid'.
- Loch Lomond Steamship Company (2003). Maid of the Loch. Balloch: Loch Lomond Steamship Co.
- Plummer, Russell (August 1978). "Maid of the Loch". Ships Monthly. 13 (8): 20–22.
