= Mostyn Cottage =

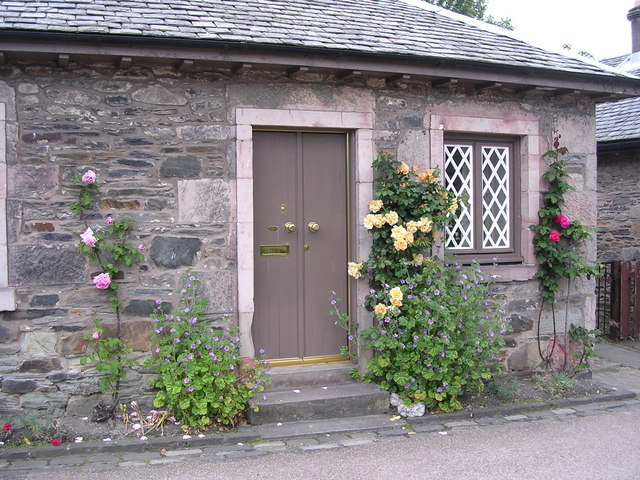
- The building in 2006

- Shown in Argyll and Bute
- 56.1014537°N 4.637905°W
- Location: Pier Road; Luss; Argyll and Bute; Scotland

History
- Built: mid-19th century

Listed Building – Category B
- Designated: 14 May 1971
- Reference no.: LB14435

Mostyn Cottage is a building in Luss, Argyll and Bute, Scotland. It is a Category B listed structure dating to the mid 19th century.

The building, a single-storey cottage located on Pier Road, is made of whinstone and sandstone rubble with pink sandstone margins and dressings. It has projecting bracketed eaves. It possesses leaded casement windows and octagonal ridge chimney stacks with octagonal cans. It is a variant of the common form of cottage found elsewhere on the street.

The building is shown on the first-edition Ordnance Survey map, surveyed in 1864.

== See also ==
- List of listed buildings in Luss, Argyll and Bute
