= Lochview and Pier Cottage =

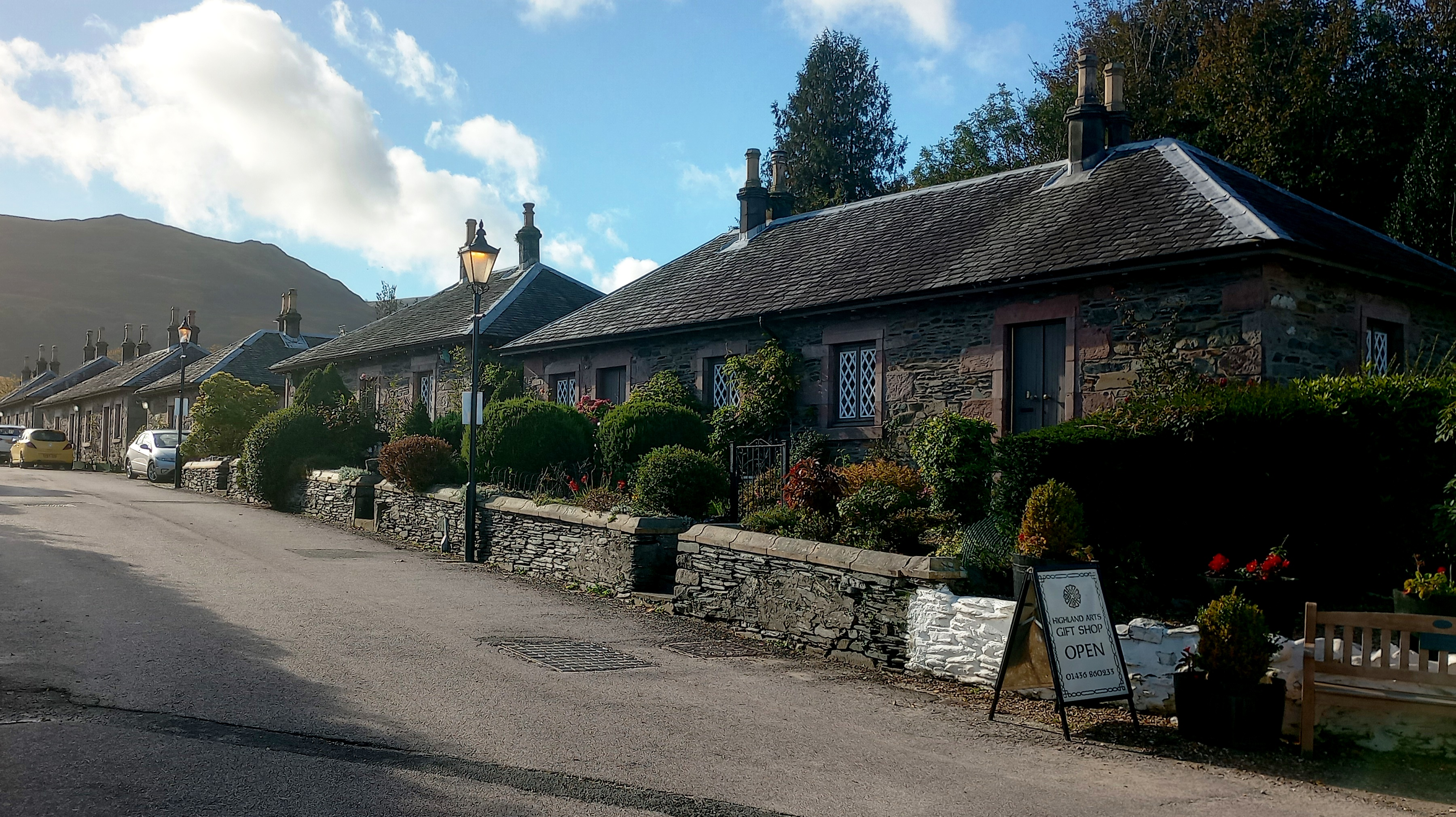
- The cottages in 2022

- Shown in Argyll and Bute
- 56.101881°N 4.637474°W
- Location: Pier Road; Luss; Argyll and Bute; Scotland

History
- Built: mid-19th century

Listed Building – Category B
- Designated: 14 May 1971
- Reference no.: LB43981

Lochview and Pier Cottage is a pair of buildings in Luss, Argyll and Bute, Scotland. They are Category B listed, dating to the mid 19th century.

The buildings, single-storey cottages located on Pier Road, are made of whinstone and sandstone rubble with pink sandstone margins and dressings. The cottage to the left has a central door with flanking windows, while that on the right has a single window to the left of the door. Both possess timber diamond-paned casement windows. Each cottage has a pair of octagonal chimney stacks with octagonal cans.

Pier Cottage is sometimes referred to as Pierview Cottage.

== See also ==
- List of listed buildings in Luss, Argyll and Bute
