= Sunnyside (Luss) =

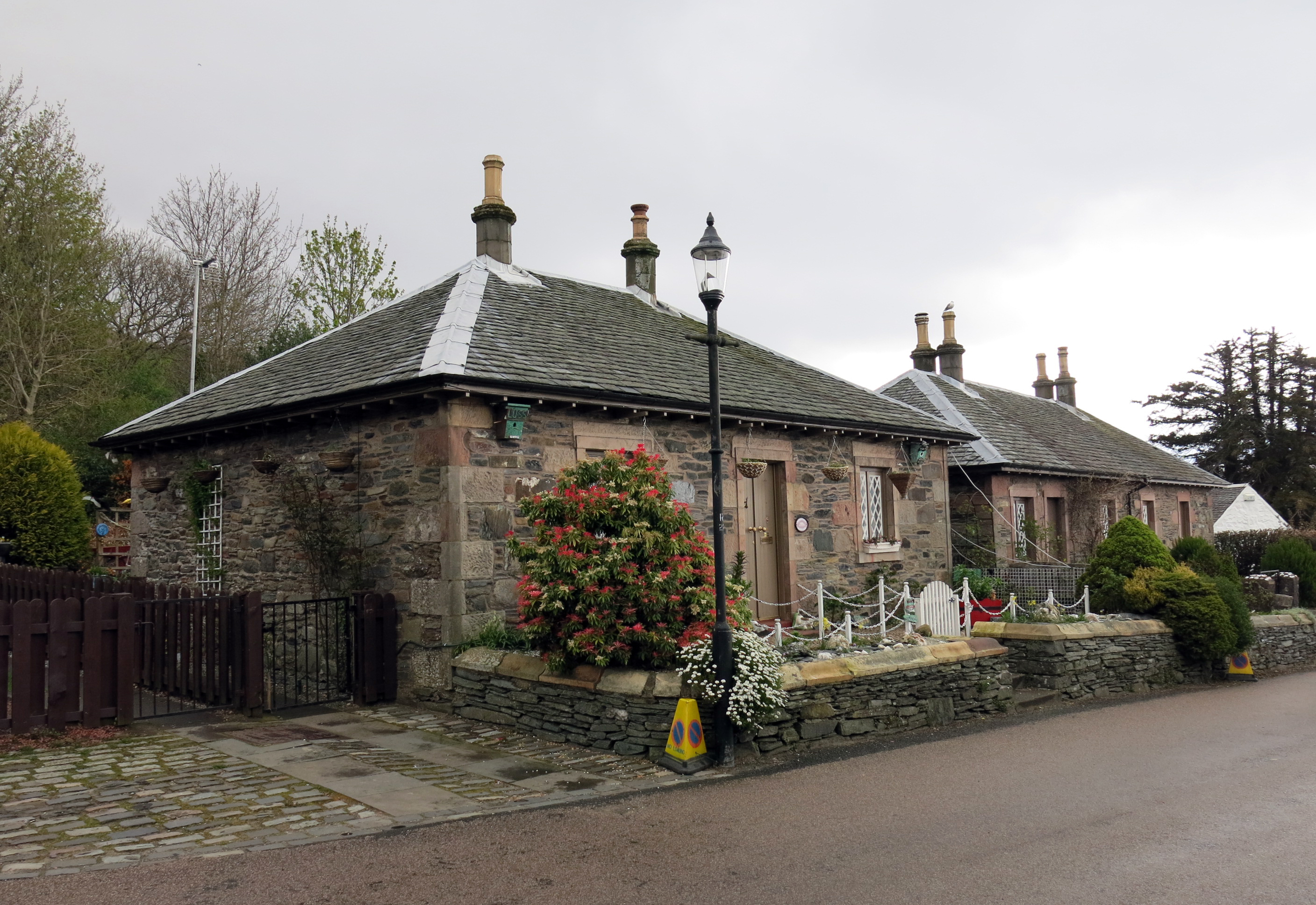
- The building in 2014

- Shown in Argyll and Bute
- 56.101734°N 4.637528°W
- Location: Pier Road; Luss; Argyll and Bute; Scotland

History
- Built: mid-19th century

Listed Building – Category B
- Designated: 14 May 1971
- Reference no.: LB14432

Sunnyside is a building in Luss, Argyll and Bute, Scotland. It is a Category B listed structure dating to the mid 19th century.

The building, a single-storey cottage located on Pier Road, is made of whinstone and sandstone rubble with pink sandstone margins and dressings. It possesses timber diamond-paned casement windows and octagonal ridge chimney stacks with octagonal cans. It is a variant of the common form of cottage found elsewhere on the street.

The building is shown on the first-edition Ordnance Survey map, surveyed in 1864.

== Gallery ==
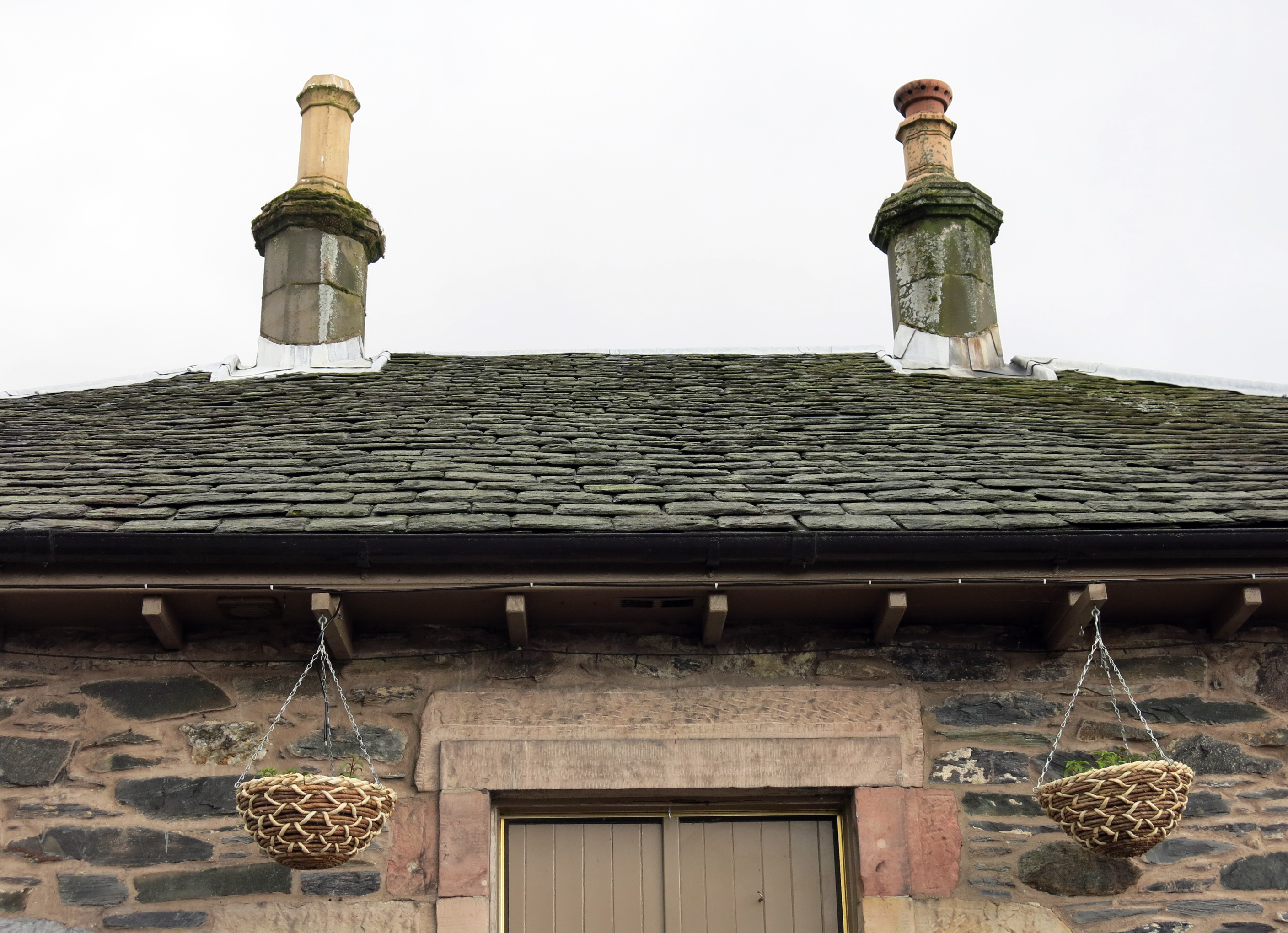
Roof detail

== See also ==
- List of listed buildings in Luss, Argyll and Bute
