= Crescent Cottage =

- Shown in Argyll and Bute
- 56.101112°N 4.638548°W
- Location: Pier Road; Luss; Argyll and Bute; Scotland

History
- Built: mid-19th century

Listed Building – Category B
- Designated: 15 May 1971
- Reference no.: LB14446

Crescent Cottage is a building in Luss, Argyll and Bute, Scotland. It is a Category B listed structure, dating to the mid-19th century.

The building, a single-storey cottage located at the northeastern corner of Pier Road and School Road, is made of whinstone and sandstone rubble with ashlar margins and dressings. It has advanced bracketed eaves. It possesses timber diamond-pane casement windows and sandstone octagonal ridge chimney stacks with octagonal cans. It is a variant of the common form of cottage found elsewhere on the street.

The building is shown on the first-edition Ordnance Survey map, surveyed in 1864.

== See also ==
- List of listed buildings in Luss, Argyll and Bute
