= Luss Parish Church =

Church in Luss, Argyll and Bute, Scotland

Coordinates: 56.1004°N 4.6367°W

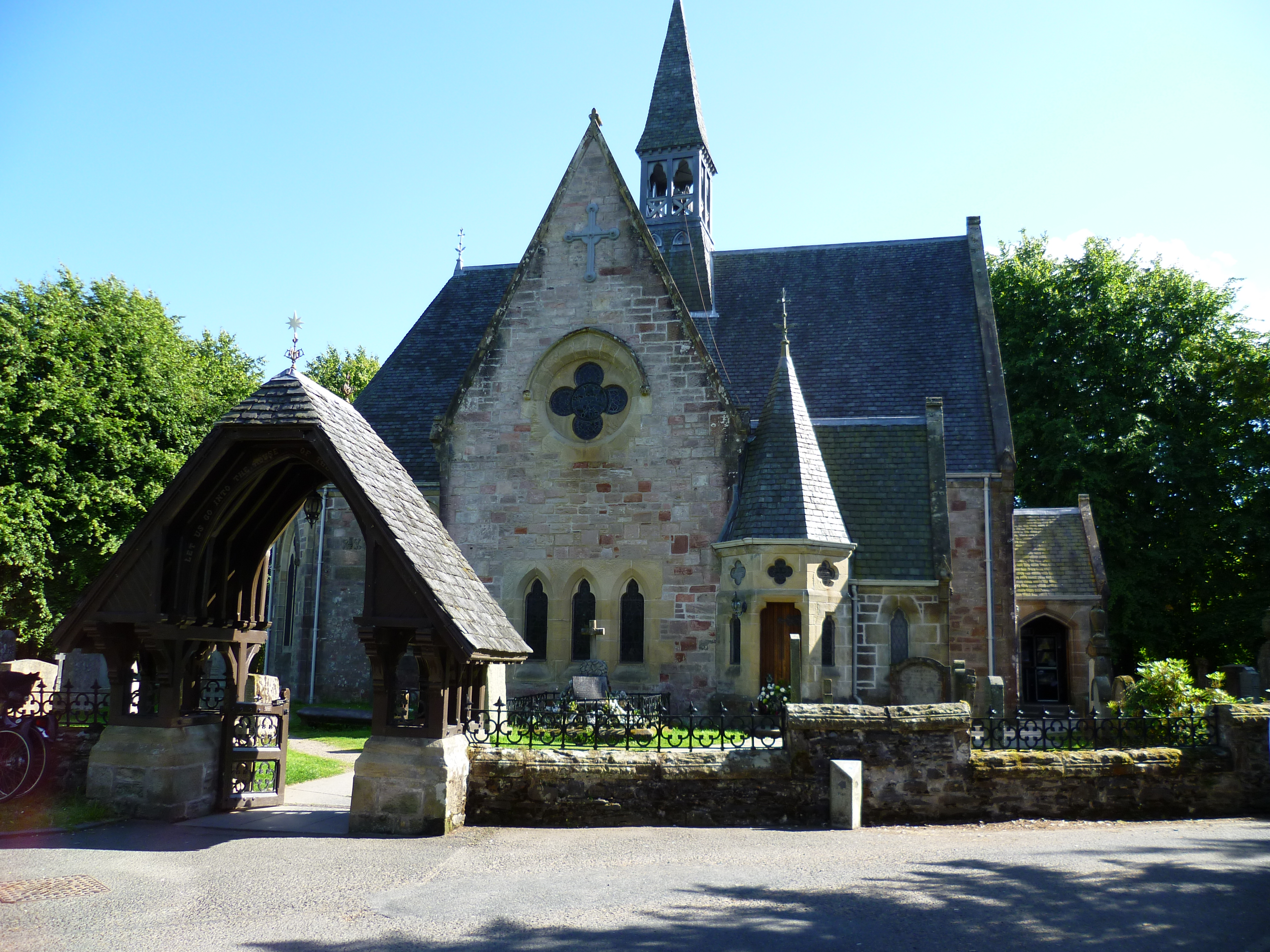
Luss Parish Church

Luss Parish Church is a Church of Scotland church in Luss, Argyll and Bute, dedicated to Saint Kessog. The present church building was constructed in 1875 and underwent major restoration works in 2001. The building became notable during the 1980s as the parish church of the fictional village of Glendarroch in the popular television series Take the High Road. The church site has had 1,500 years of continuous Christian presence, being founded by Saint Kessog, and has fifteen listed ancient monuments in its graveyard.

The church has in recent times embraced the internet, broadcasting its services online and inviting, in exception to usual Church practice, outsiders to take advantage of the picturesque location on the banks of Loch Lomond for weddings, of which 153 were held in 2009. Notable weddings to have been held at the church include that of Kirsty Hume to Donovan Leitch, Noel Edmonds to Helen Soby and Sarah Heaney to Ed Adams.

The church is a significant site for religious tourism, with over 2,000 people visiting the church on busy summer days, contributing £5 million per annum to the local economy. It is estimated to receive 750,000 visitors a year, in a parish with a population of only 400.

The church celebrated 1,500 years of worship in 2010 by opening a new visitors centre for Luss after the National Parks Authority sold its building to Purdies, a Scottish natural soap producer, and a community bid to retain the centre had failed.

== Personality ==
From 1998 to 2013, the minister was Reverend Dane Sherrard. Sherrard had previously been minister in Buckhaven, Fife, between 1977 and 1994, establishing in 1983 the Buckhaven Parish Church Agency, a government-backed jobs and training programme that went into liquidation in 1991. Sherrard then went to Cadder Parish Church in Bishopbriggs.
