= Marlyn =

Marlyn is a given name and a surname. Notable people with the name include:

- Marlyn Alonte (born 1974), Filipino politician, commonly known as Len Alonte
- Marlyn Glen (born 1951), Scottish Labour Party politician
- Marlyn Maldonado (born 1985), Guatemalan badminton player
- John Marlyn (1912–2005), Austro-Hungarian-born Canadian writer
- Marlyn Mason (born 1940), American actress, producer, and screenwriter
- Marlyn Mbakera, Namibian politician
- Marlyn Meltzer (1922–2008), one of the six original programmers of ENIAC
- Marc Marlyn Trestman (born 1956), American football and Canadian football coach

== See also ==
- Lonaigbank and Marlyn, pair of buildings in Luss, Argyll and Bute, Scotland
