= Shore Cottage (Luss) =

Architectural structure in Argyll and Bute, Scotland

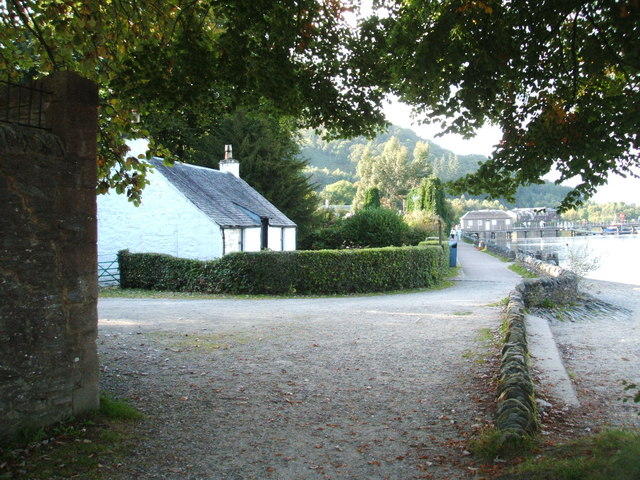
- The cottage in 2009, looking north along the shore path to the village

- Shown in Argyll and Bute
- 56.100786°N 4.636161°W
- Location: Luss; Argyll and Bute; Scotland

History
- Built: early 19th century

Listed Building – Category C(S)
- Designated: 13 March 1997
- Reference no.: LB43983

Shore Cottage is a building in Luss, Argyll and Bute, Scotland. A Category C listed cottage dating from the early to mid-19th century, it overlooks the western shore of Loch Lomond to the south of Luss village. It is the only building on the southern stretch of the shore path; between the cottage and the village are the back gardens of the properties on Church Road to the west.

As of 2021, the cottage is the home of The Clan Shop.

== See also ==
- List of listed buildings in Luss, Argyll and Bute
