= Luss War Memorial =

War memorial in Luss, Argyll and Bute, Scotland

- Scotland
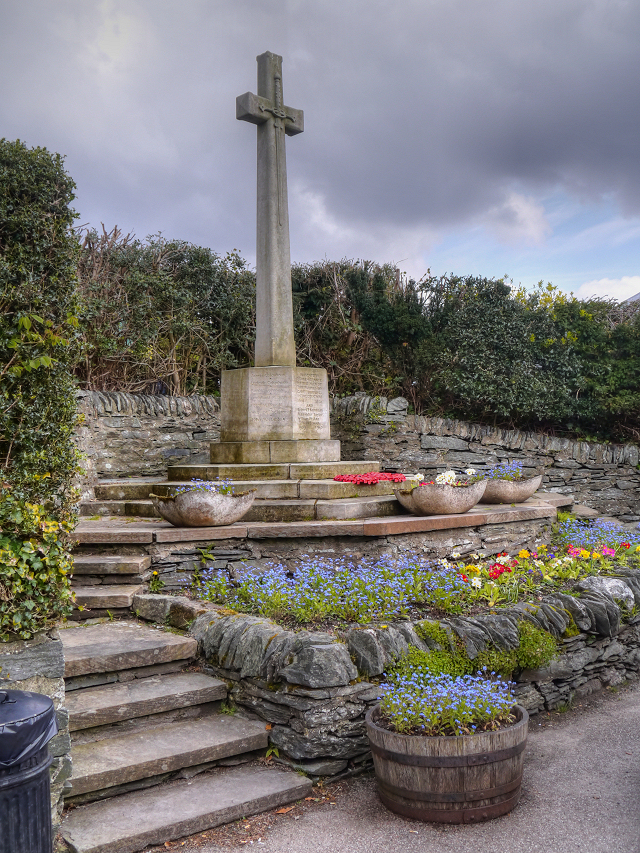
- For soldiers who died and served in World War I and World War II
- Unveiled: c. 1920
- Location: 56.101188°N 4.6383771°W; Pier Road, Luss, Argyll and Bute, Scotland
- IN GRATEFUL; REMEMBRANCE OF THE MEN OF; THIS PARISH WHO; GAVE THEIR LIVES; IN THE GREAT WAR. 1914 – 1919; AND; ROBERT T HAMILTON; ALEXANDER TAYLOR; WILLIAM FISKEN; IN THE WAR; 1939 – 1945

Erected around 1920, the Luss War Memorial is located on Pier Road in Luss, Argyll and Bute, Scotland. It is dedicated to the citizens of the village who lost their lives while in military service during World War I and World War II. It is a Category C listed structure.

The memorial is set inside a whinstone wall recess with steps up to a cross with a Pictish sword in relief, set on octagonal base.

== Detail ==
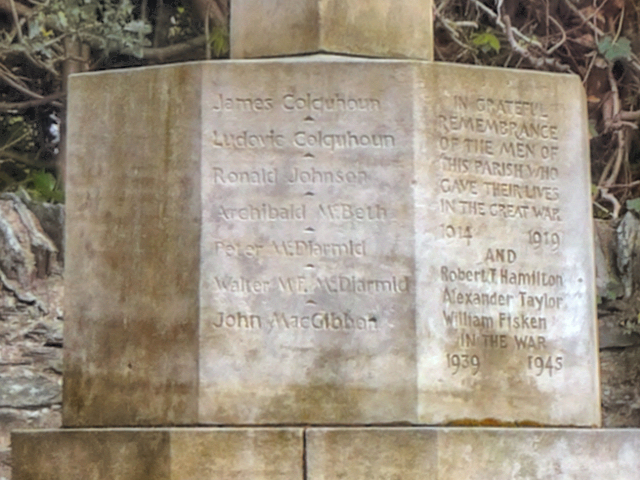
The base of the memorial
