= Alderdale =

- Shown in Argyll and Bute
- 56.100912°N 4.639772°W
- Location: Pier Road; Luss; Argyll and Bute; Scotland

History
- Built: early-to-mid 19th century

Listed Building – Category C(S)
- Designated: 14 May 1971
- Reference no.: LB14447

Alderdale is a building in Luss, Argyll and Bute, Scotland. It is a Category C listed structure dating from the early-to-mid 19th century.

The building, a single-storey cottage located on Pier Road, is constructed of rubble with ashlar margins and dressings. It possesses timber sash and case windows and low sandstone chimney stacks with moulded projecting.

The building is shown on the first-edition Ordnance Survey map, surveyed in 1864. Its construction is similar to the neighbouring Holly Cottage, and it has similar glazing to South Cottage at Low Aldochlay.

== See also ==
- List of listed buildings in Luss
