= Elmbank, Luss =

Elmbank
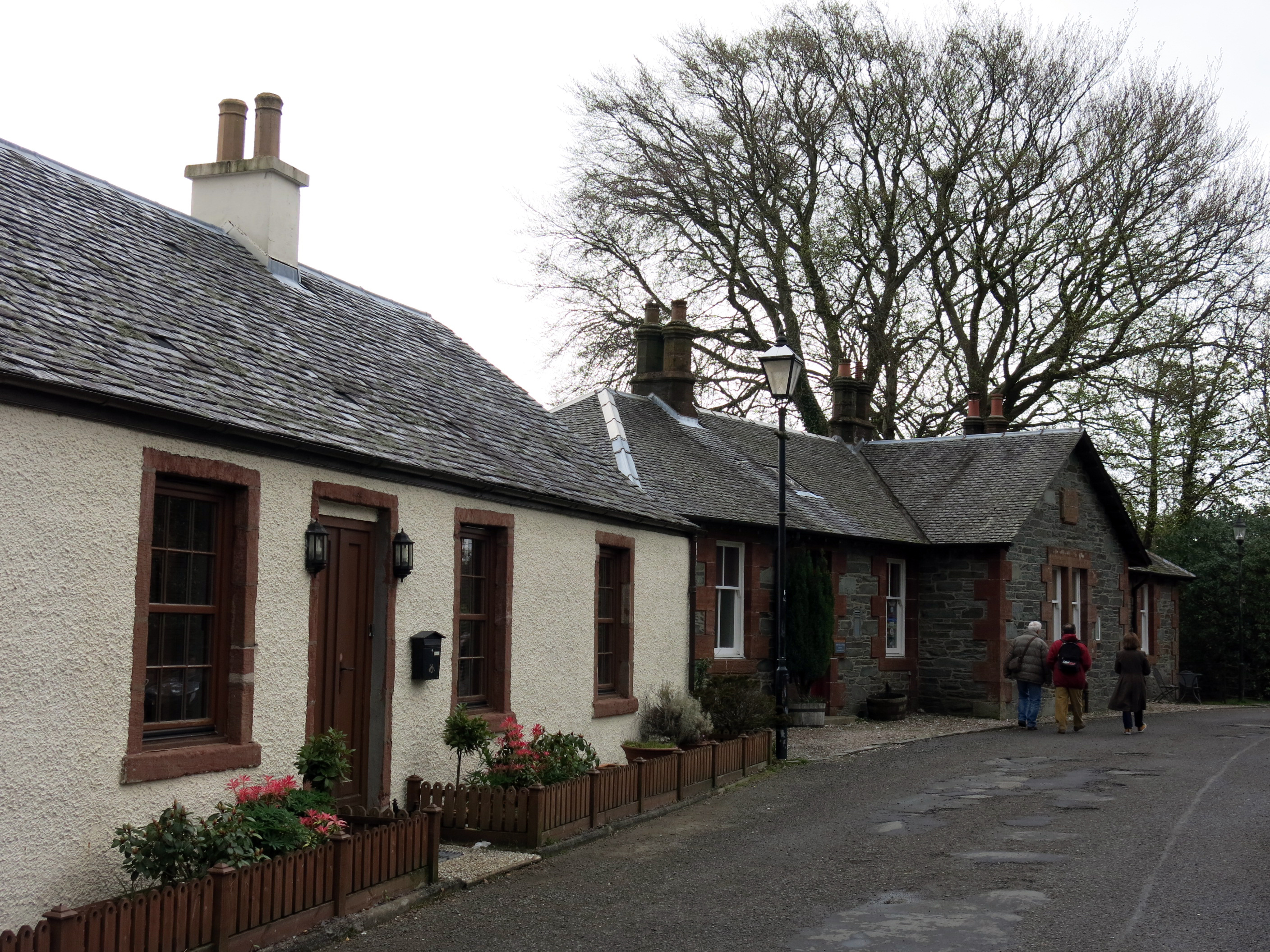
- Elmbank (on the left) and Tighnafois in 2014

- Shown in Argyll and Bute
- 56.101202°N 4.636865°W
- Location: Church Road; Luss; Argyll and Bute; Scotland

History
- Built: early 19th century

Listed Building – Category C(S)
- Designated: 15 August 1985
- Reference no.: LB14466

Elmbank is a building in Luss, Argyll and Bute, Scotland. It is a Category C listed building, dating to the early 19th century.

The building, a single-storey cottage located on Church Road, dates to the early 19th century and has later alterations and additions. A notable feature is its twelve-pane timber sash and case windows.

== See also ==
- List of listed buildings in Luss, Argyll and Bute
