= Pier Road =

Street in Luss, Argyll and Bute, Scotland

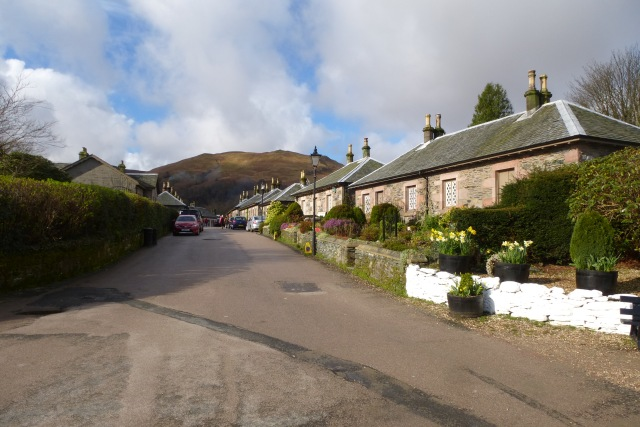
- Pier Road, viewed from its eastern end at Loch Lomond in 2016
- Interactive map of Pier Road
- Length: 0.20 mi (0.32 km)
- Location: Luss, Scotland, UK
- Postal code: G83
- Coordinates: 56.1011°N 4.6383°W
- East end: Loch Lomond shore path
- West end: Main Road

Pier Road is a street in Luss, Argyll and Bute, Scotland. Located on Loch Lomond's western shore, the road, which is on an east–west alignment, consists of around twenty buildings, many of which are listed cottages dating from the 19th century.

The building closest to the Luss Pier, at the head of Pier Road, is a whitewashed cottage that is currently the home of Highland Art Studios.

The building housing Luss General Store is a Category C listed building dating to the early or mid-19th century.

Opposite the western end of the road is the Loch Lomond Arms Hotel (formerly the Colquhoun Arms Hotel). The property was purchased by Luss Estates in 2012.

== Notable buildings and structures ==
Below is a selection of notable buildings and structures on both sides of Pier Road. Each section is ordered from east to west:

=== Northern side ===
Name	Location	Date listed	Geo-coordinates	Notes	Category	LB number	Image
Luss Village, Lochview and Pier Cottage With Boundary Wall			56°06′07″N 4°38′15″W		B	43981	Upload another image
Luss Village, Sunnyside			56°06′06″N 4°38′15″W		B	14432	Upload another image
Luss Village, Yewbank and Lonaigview			56°06′06″N 4°38′16″W		B	14433	Upload Photo
Luss Village, Lonaigbank and Marlyn			56°06′06″N 4°38′16″W		B	14434	Upload another image
Luss Village, Mostyn Cottage			56°06′05″N 4°38′17″W		B	14435	Upload another image
Luss Village, Fernlea and Ivy Cottage			56°06′05″N 4°38′17″W		B	14444	Upload Photo
Luss Village, Roselea			56°06′04″N 4°38′18″W		B	14445	Upload Photo
Luss Village, War Memorial			56°06′04″N 4°38′18″W		C(S)	43986	Upload another image
Luss Village, Crescent Cottage			56°06′04″N 4°38′19″W		B	14446	Upload Photo
Luss Village, Tigh A Mhaoir			56°06′04″N 4°38′21″W		B	14426	Upload another image
Luss Village, Holly Cottage			56°06′03″N 4°38′22″W		B	14425	Upload Photo
Luss Village, Alderdale With Boundary Wall			56°06′03″N 4°38′24″W		C(S)	14447	Upload Photo

=== Southern side ===
Name	Location	Date listed	Geo-coordinates	Notes	Category	LB number	Image
Luss Village, Avonlea and Ivy Bank			56°06′05″N 4°38′16″W		B	19697	Upload another image
Luss Village, Rose Cottage and The Sheiling			56°06′05″N 4°38′16″W		B	43982	Upload Photo
Luss Village, Laurel Cottage and Ravenslea			56°06′04″N 4°38′17″W		B	14463	Upload Photo
Luss Village, Luss General Store			56°06′07″N 4°38′15″W		C(S)	14431	Upload Photo

== See also ==
- List of listed buildings in Luss
