= Luss General Store =

- Loch Lomond Post Office (former use)
- Shown in Argyll and Bute
- 56.101012°N 4.638316°W
- Location: Pier Road; Luss; Argyll and Bute; Scotland

History
- Built: mid-19th century

Listed Building – Category C(S)
- Designated: 13 March 1997
- Reference no.: LB14431

Luss General Store is a building in Luss, Argyll and Bute, Scotland. It is a Category C listed structure dating to the mid-19th century. It was formerly the village post office.

The building, a single-storey structure located on Pier Road, is a rectangular plan with apsidal ends. It is made of stugged pink sandstone ashlar with painted ashlar margins. It has projecting bracketed eaves and a broad corniced chimney stack with a single circular can.

The building is shown on the first-edition Ordnance Survey map, surveyed in 1864.

== See also ==
- List of listed buildings in Luss, Argyll and Bute
