= Avonlea and Ivy Bank =

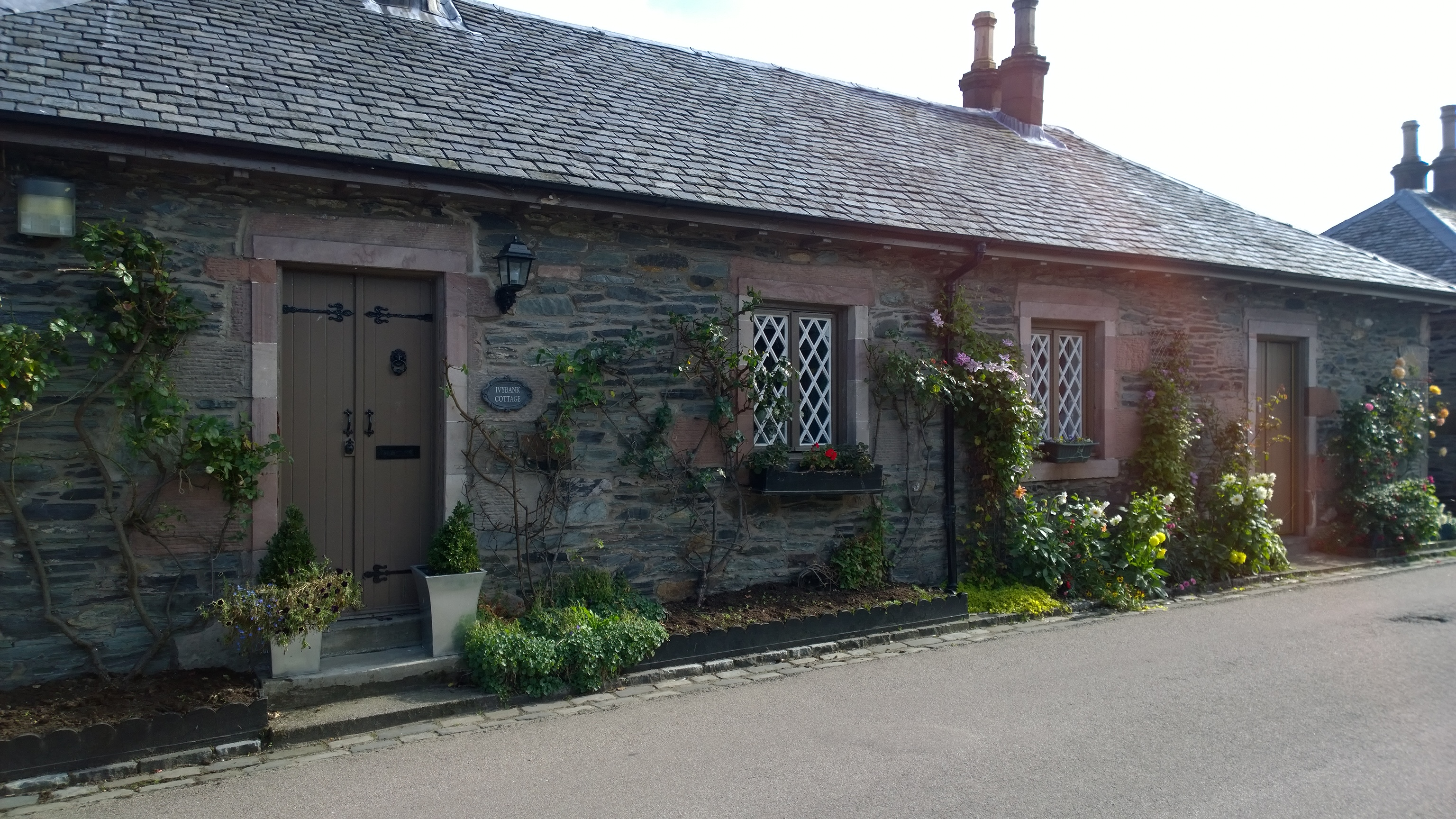
- Ivy Bank (left) and Avonlea

- Shown in Argyll and Bute
- 56.101377°N 4.637717°W
- Location: Pier Road; Luss; Argyll and Bute; Scotland

History
- Built: mid-19th century

Listed Building – Category B
- Designated: 14 May 1971
- Reference no.: LB19697

Avonlea and Ivy Bank is a pair of buildings in Luss, Argyll and Bute, Scotland. They are Category B listed, dating to the mid 19th century.

The buildings, single-storey cottages located on Pier Road, are made of whinstone and sandstone rubble with pink sandstone margins and dressings. Both possess timber diamond-paned casement windows. Each cottage has a pair of octagonal corniced chimney stacks with octagonal cans.

The buildings are shown on the first-edition Ordnance Survey map, surveyed in 1864. They are an identical pair with Yewbank and Lonaigview, Fernlea and Ivy Cottage, Laurel Cottage and Ravenslea and Rose Cottage and The Sheiling. Two of the five are on the northern side of the street; three on the southern.

== Gallery ==
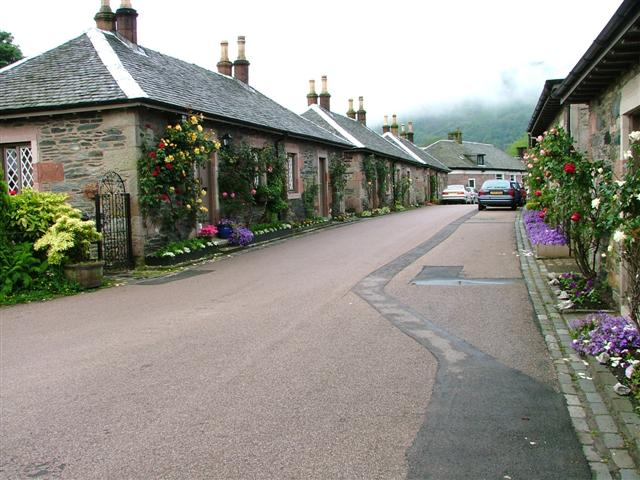
Looking west. Avonlea and Ivy Bank, Rose Cottage and The Sheiling and Laurel Cottage and Ravenslea

== See also ==
- List of listed buildings in Luss, Argyll and Bute
