= Lonaigbank and Marlyn =

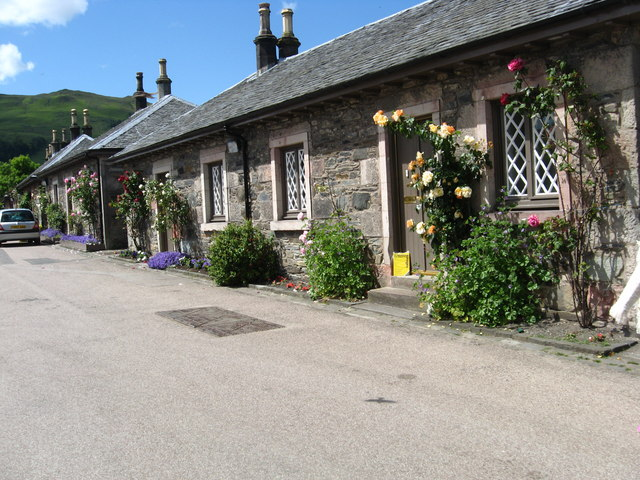
- The cottages in 2009

- Shown in Argyll and Bute
- 56.101566°N 4.637801°W
- Location: Pier Road; Luss; Argyll and Bute; Scotland

History
- Built: mid-19th century

Listed Building – Category B
- Designated: 14 May 1971
- Reference no.: LB14434

Lonaigbank and Marlyn is a pair of buildings in Luss, Argyll and Bute, Scotland. They are Category B listed, dating to the mid 19th century.

The buildings, single-storey cottages located on Pier Road, are made of whinstone and sandstone rubble with pink sandstone margins and dressings. Both possess timber diamond-paned casement windows. Each cottage has a pair of octagonal corniced chimney stacks with octagonal cans. It is a variant of the common form of cottage found elsewhere on the street.

The buildings are shown on the first-edition Ordnance Survey map, surveyed in 1860.

== See also ==
- List of listed buildings in Luss, Argyll and Bute
