= Tigh A Mhaoir =

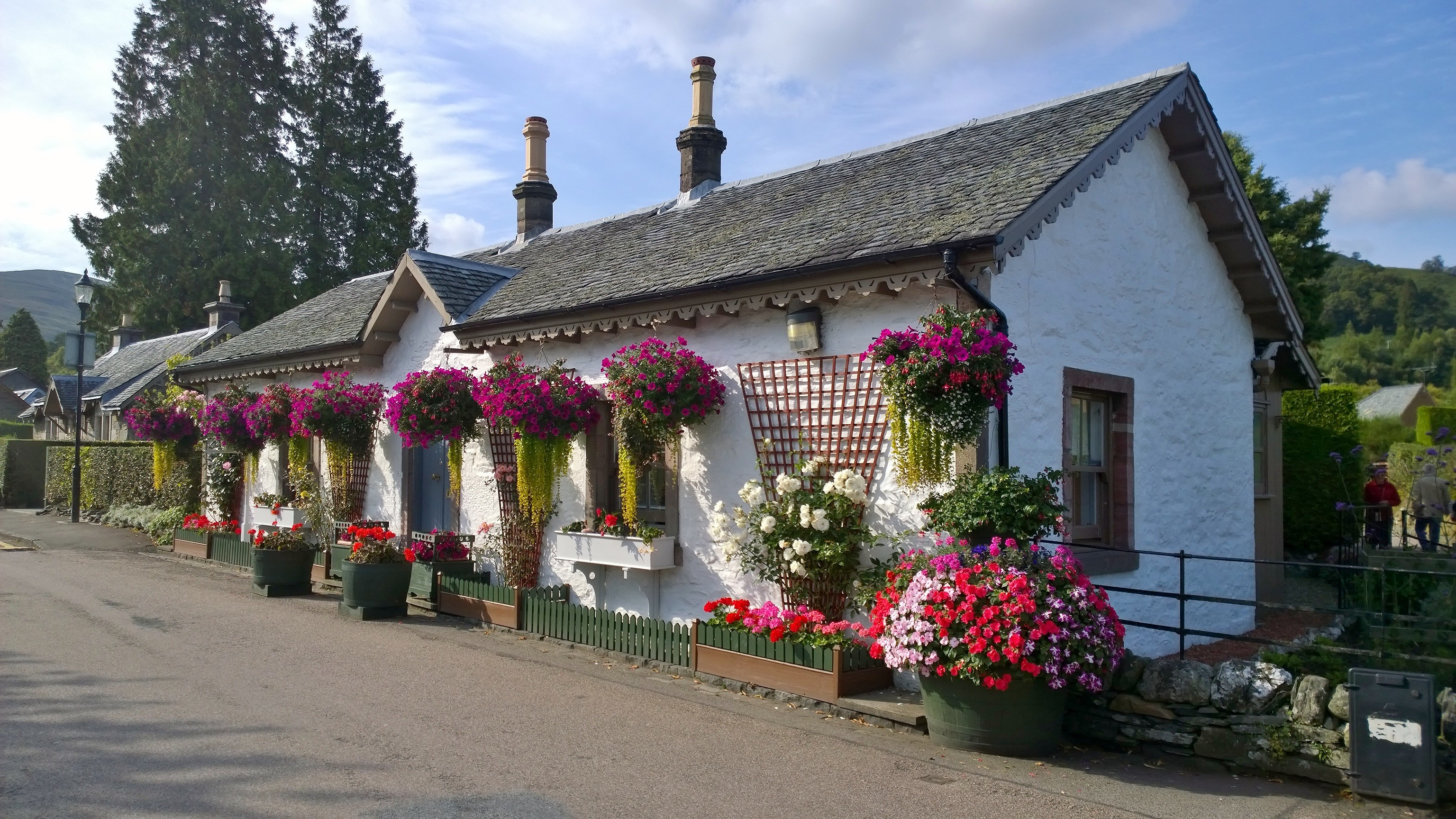
- The building in 2014

- Shown in Argyll and Bute
- 56.1010543°N 4.639009°W
- Location: Pier Road; Luss; Argyll and Bute; Scotland

History
- Built: early-to-mid 19th century

Listed Building – Category B
- Designated: 14 May 1971
- Reference no.: LB14426

Tigh A Mhaoir is a building in Luss, Argyll and Bute, Scotland. It is a Category B listed structure dating from the early-to-mid 19th century.

The building, a single-storey cottage located at the northwestern corner of Pier Road and School Road, is constructed of painted rubble with pink sandstone margins and dressings. It possesses four-pane timber sash and case windows and narrow sandstone corniced ridge chimney stacks with octagonal cans.

The building is shown on the first-edition Ordnance Survey map, surveyed in 1864.

== Gallery ==
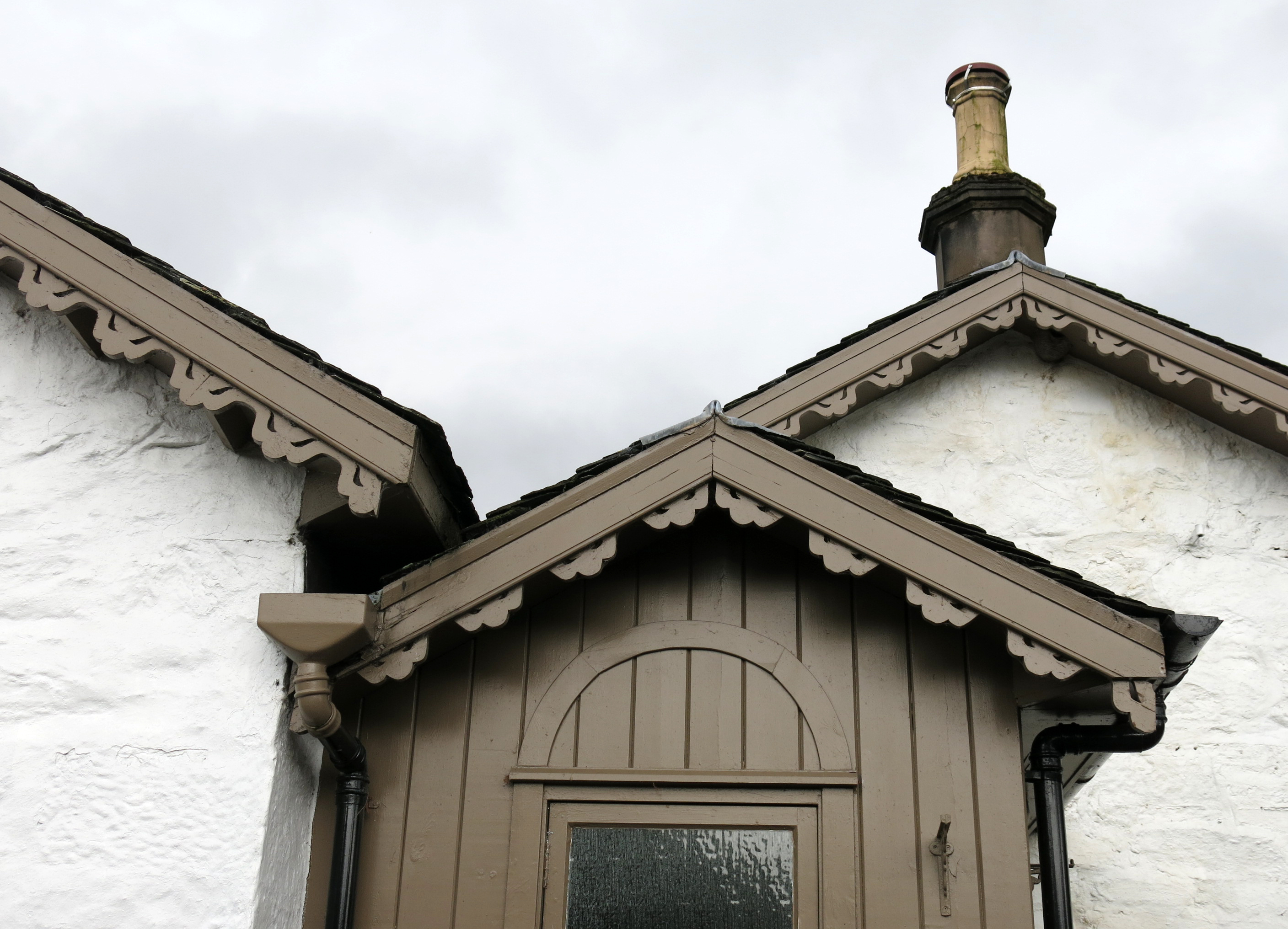
Detail on the building's eastern elevation

== See also ==
- List of listed buildings in Luss
