= Thistle Cottage =

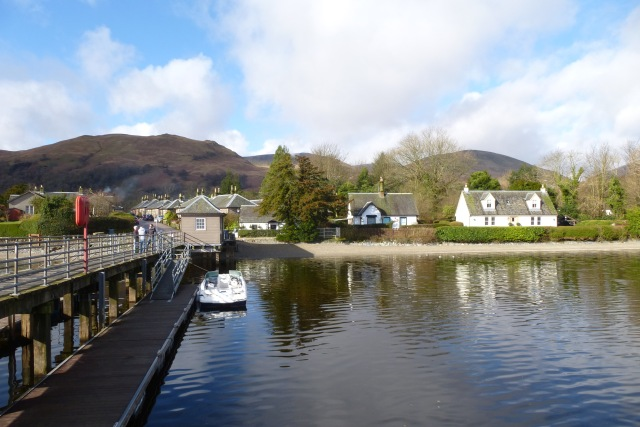
- Thistle Cottage is the first of the two whitewashed buildings in this 2016 photo

- Shown in Argyll and Bute
- 56.102105°N 4.637522°W
- Location: Luss; Argyll and Bute; Scotland

History
- Built: late 19th century

Listed Building – Category C(S)
- Designated: 13 March 1997
- Reference no.: LB43984

Thistle Cottage is a building in Luss, Argyll and Bute, Scotland. A Category C listed cottage dating to the late 19th century, it overlooks the western shore of Loch Lomond to the north of Luss Pier.

While no precise date of construction is known, the cottage did not appear on the 1868 Ordnance Survey map.

== See also ==
- List of listed buildings in Luss, Argyll and Bute
