= Whindust =

Fine-grained grit or dust by-product of grinding and breaking of whinstone

Whindust is a local name used in Scotland and the North of England referring to fine-grained grit or dust resulting as a by-product from the grinding and breaking of whinstone. Whindust is available in several forms, washed whindust, damp whindust and whindust. The principal uses of the aggregate are for creating a low-cost firm base under landscaping features. Typically the dust would be applied over a foundation layer of heavier rubble. The dust is of a very hard igneous rock so does not break down into sand, yet it does pack into a very solid form. This makes the product ideal for slabbing and driveways.
