= List of listed buildings in Luss =

This is a list of listed buildings in the parish of Luss in Argyll and Bute, Scotland.

== List ==
Name	Location	Date Listed	Grid Ref. (Note: Sometimes known as OSGB36, the grid reference (where provided) is based on the British national grid reference system used by the Ordnance Survey. • "Guide to National Grid". Ordnance Survey. • "Get-a-map". Ordnance Survey.)	Geo-coordinates	Notes	LB Number (Note: Historic Environment Scotland assign a unique alphanumeric identifier to each designated site in Scotland, for listed buildings this always begins with "LB", for example "LB12345".)	Image
Boiden				56°02′18″N 4°38′28″W	Category C(S)	43960	Upload Photo
Burnfoot				56°01′40″N 4°37′57″W	Category C(S)	43961	Upload Photo
Gallowhill				56°03′17″N 4°38′48″W	Category C(S)	43967	Upload Photo
Low Aldochlay, Rowanbank With Railings				56°05′13″N 4°38′14″W	Category C(S)	43972	Upload Photo
Luss Village, The Bungalow Cleveland Bank				56°06′05″N 4°38′14″W	Category B	43976	Upload Photo
Luss Village, Hall House And Luss Hall With Boundary Wall				56°06′03″N 4°38′19″W	Category C(S)	43980	Upload Photo
Luss Village, Lochview and Pier Cottage With Boundary Wall				56°06′07″N 4°38′15″W	Category B	43981	Upload another image
Port Of Rossdhu, Mill Bridge				56°04′09″N 4°38′40″W	Category C(S)	43990	Upload Photo
Rossbank With Outbuildings				56°01′42″N 4°38′33″W	Category B	43993	Upload Photo
Rossdhu Estate, Walled Garden With Glasshouses				56°03′41″N 4°37′59″W	Category B	43997	Upload Photo
Shemore With Outbuildings				56°03′37″N 4°39′31″W	Category B	43998	Upload Photo
Rossdhu Estate, South Lodge And Gate With Railings				56°02′46″N 4°38′45″W	Category A	19698	Upload another image
Luss Village, St Mackessog's Church (Church Of Scotland) With Burial Ground, Lych Gates And Boundary Wall				56°06′01″N 4°38′12″W	Category B	14430	Upload another image
Luss Village, Yewbank and Lonaigview				56°06′06″N 4°38′16″W	Category B	14433	Upload Photo
Luss Village, Crescent Cottage				56°06′04″N 4°38′19″W	Category B	14446	Upload Photo
Rossdhu Estate, Ross Lodge With Gatepiers And Railings				56°03′27″N 4°38′43″W	Category B	14455	Upload Photo
High Aldochlay, 2 Roselea Cottages				56°05′16″N 4°38′18″W	Category C(S)	14460	Upload Photo
Luss Village, Elmbank				56°06′04″N 4°38′13″W	Category C(S)	14466	Upload another image
Luss Village, Rose Cottage and The Sheiling				56°06′04″N 4°38′17″W	Category B	43982	Upload Photo
Luss Village, Thistle Cottage				56°06′08″N 4°38′15″W	Category C(S)	43984	Upload another image
Luss Village, War Memorial				56°06′04″N 4°38′18″W	Category C(S)	43986	Upload another image
Ross Arden				56°05′05″N 4°38′08″W	Category C(S)	43992	Upload Photo
Millburn Cottage And Mill				56°06′00″N 4°38′37″W	Category B	19700	Upload Photo
Luss Village, Luss General Store				56°06′07″N 4°38′15″W	Category C(S)	14431	Upload Photo
Auchentullich Namoin With Outbuildings				56°02′19″N 4°38′42″W	Category C(S)	43958	Upload Photo
Bandry Cottages With Railings				56°04′50″N 4°38′23″W	Category B	43959	Upload Photo
Camstradden House With Sundial, Boundary Wall And Gatepiers				56°05′37″N 4°38′17″W	Category B	43962	Upload Photo
High Aldochlay, South Cottage And North Cottage				56°05′16″N 4°38′17″W	Category B	43969	Upload Photo
Luss Village, Colquhoun Arms Hotel				56°06′02″N 4°38′29″W	Category C(S)	43978	Upload Photo
Nether Ross				56°01′53″N 4°38′16″W	Category C(S)	43989	Upload Photo
Rossdhu Estate, Dairy Dwelling				56°03′32″N 4°37′59″W	Category C(S)	43996	Upload Photo
Luss Village, Avonlea and Ivy Bank				56°06′05″N 4°38′16″W	Category B	19697	Upload another image
Luss Village, Mostyn Cottage				56°06′05″N 4°38′17″W	Category B	14435	Upload another image
Rossdhu Estate, Icehouse				56°04′16″N 4°38′02″W	Category C(S)	14450	Upload Photo
Luss Village, The Anchorage And Lomondbank				56°06′05″N 4°38′14″W	Category B	14465	Upload another image
Glen Luss, Edentaggart Bridge				56°06′38″N 4°41′36″W	Category C(S)	14468	Upload Photo
Rossdhu House With Walled Garden				56°04′12″N 4°38′00″W	Category A	14469	Upload another image See more images
Halfton Cottage				56°05′46″N 4°38′30″W	Category C(S)	43968	Upload Photo
Luss Village, Church Of Scotland Manse With Boundary Wall				56°06′03″N 4°38′14″W	Category C(S)	43977	Upload Photo
Luss Village, Shore Cottage				56°06′03″N 4°38′10″W	Category C(S)	43983	Upload another image
Luss Village, Holly Cottage				56°06′03″N 4°38′22″W	Category B	14425	Upload Photo
Luss Village, Tigh A Mhaoir				56°06′04″N 4°38′21″W	Category B	14426	Upload another image
Luss Village, Fernlea and Ivy Cottage				56°06′05″N 4°38′17″W	Category B	14444	Upload Photo
Low Aldochlay, Braeside With Gates And Railings				56°05′12″N 4°38′14″W	Category B	14459	Upload Photo
Crosskeys Cottage				56°01′49″N 4°40′06″W	Category C(S)	43964	Upload Photo
Low Aldochlay, Rose Cottage				56°05′11″N 4°38′17″W	Category C(S)	43971	Upload Photo
Low Bridge				56°02′08″N 4°38′24″W	Category B	43975	Upload Photo
Luss Village, Tighnafois				56°06′04″N 4°38′12″W	Category C(S)	43985	Upload Photo
Muirland Cottage				56°02′38″N 4°39′18″W	Category C(S)	43987	Upload Photo
Rossdhu Estate, Dairy Complex				56°03′32″N 4°37′58″W	Category B	43995	Upload Photo
Bannachra Castle				56°01′22″N 4°39′39″W	Category B	19699	Upload Photo
Luss Village, Sunnyside				56°06′06″N 4°38′15″W	Category B	14432	Upload another image
Luss Village, Roselea				56°06′04″N 4°38′18″W	Category B	14445	Upload Photo
Luss Village, Laurel Cottage and Ravenslea				56°06′04″N 4°38′17″W	Category B	14463	Upload Photo
Glen Luss Chapel Memorial				56°06′39″N 4°40′37″W	Category C(S)	14464	Upload Photo
Duchlage Farmhouse With Steading And Paddock Fencing				56°02′54″N 4°39′02″W	Category C(S)	43966	Upload Photo
Low Aldochlay Cottage				56°05′11″N 4°38′14″W	Category C(S)	43973	Upload Photo
Luss Village, Dell Cottage				56°06′01″N 4°38′17″W	Category C(S)	43979	Upload Photo
Muirland School With Wall And Railings				56°02′44″N 4°39′11″W	Category B	43988	Upload Photo
Luss Village, Lonaigbank and Marlyn				56°06′06″N 4°38′16″W	Category B	14434	Upload another image
Rossdhu Estate, St Mary's Chapel With Grave Monuments				56°04′15″N 4°38′02″W	Category B	14449	Upload Photo
Culag Old Military Bridge				56°08′15″N 4°39′36″W	Category C(S)	14462	Upload Photo
Glen Luss, Chapel Hill Bridge				56°06′42″N 4°41′07″W	Category B	14467	Upload Photo
Ardallie				56°05′17″N 4°38′30″W	Category C(S)	43957	Upload Photo
Carn Dearg				56°06′09″N 4°38′33″W	Category C(S)	43963	Upload Photo
Inchgalbraith, Galbraith Castle				56°04′40″N 4°37′19″W	Category C(S)	43970	Upload Photo
Low Aldochlay, Cottage				56°05′11″N 4°38′14″W	Category C(S)	43974	Upload Photo
Rossdhu Estate, Coach House				56°04′13″N 4°38′08″W	Category B	43994	Upload Photo
Springbank Cottage				56°02′41″N 4°39′11″W	Category C(S)	43999	Upload Photo
Rossdhu Estate, Laundry				56°04′14″N 4°38′07″W	Category B	14452	Upload Photo
Darroch Cottage				56°05′48″N 4°38′40″W	Category C(S)	43965	Upload Photo
Port Of Rossdhu, Mill				56°04′09″N 4°38′38″W	Category C(S)	43991	Upload Photo
Luss Village, Alderdale With Boundary Wall				56°06′03″N 4°38′24″W	Category C(S)	14447	Upload Photo
Rossdhu Castle				56°04′13″N 4°38′05″W	Category B	14448	Upload Photo
Rossdhu Lodge, North Lodge With Gatepiers And Railings				56°04′24″N 4°38′20″W	Category B	14454	Upload Photo
Inverbeg Bridge				56°08′43″N 4°39′58″W	Category C(S)	49637	Upload Photo

== Key ==
The scheme for classifying buildings in Scotland is:

- Category A: "buildings of national or international importance, either architectural or historic; or fine, little-altered examples of some particular period, style or building type."
- Category B: "buildings of regional or more than local importance; or major examples of some particular period, style or building type, which may have been altered."
- Category C: "buildings of local importance; lesser examples of any period, style, or building type, as originally constructed or moderately altered; and simple traditional buildings which group well with other listed buildings."

In March 2016 there were 47,288 listed buildings in Scotland. Of these, 8% were Category A, and 50% were Category B, with the remaining 42% being Category C.

== See also ==
- List of listed buildings in Argyll and Bute
