= Kessog =

Irish missionary

Saint Kessog
- Born: c. 460 at Cashel, Tipperary, Ireland
- Died: March 10, 520; Bandry, Scotland
- Venerated in: Eastern Orthodox Church, Roman Catholic Church, Scottish Episcopal Church
- Feast: March 10
- Attributes: in a soldier's habit, holding a bow bent with an arrow in it
- Patronage: Lennox and Scotland

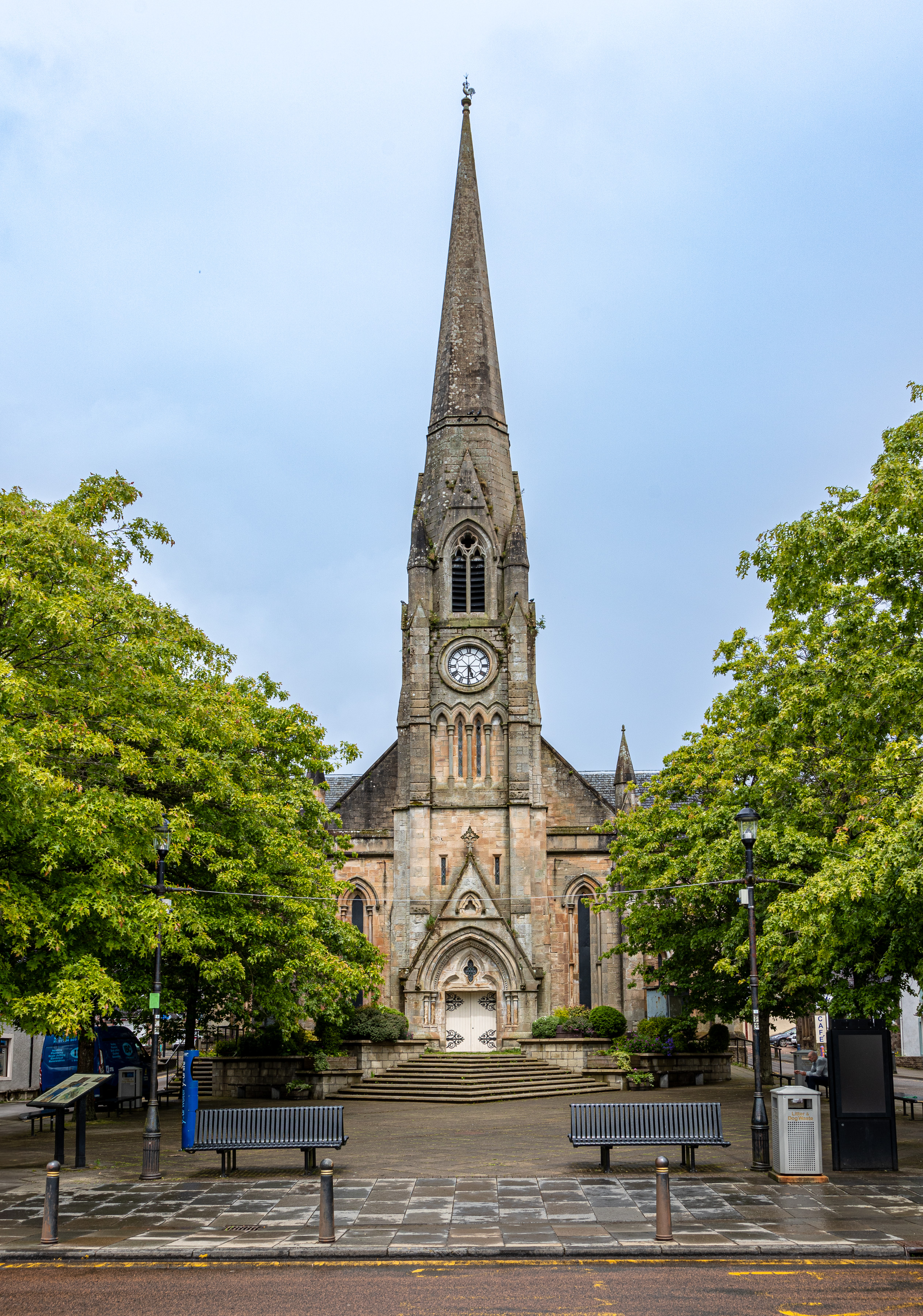
St. Kessog's Church, Callander

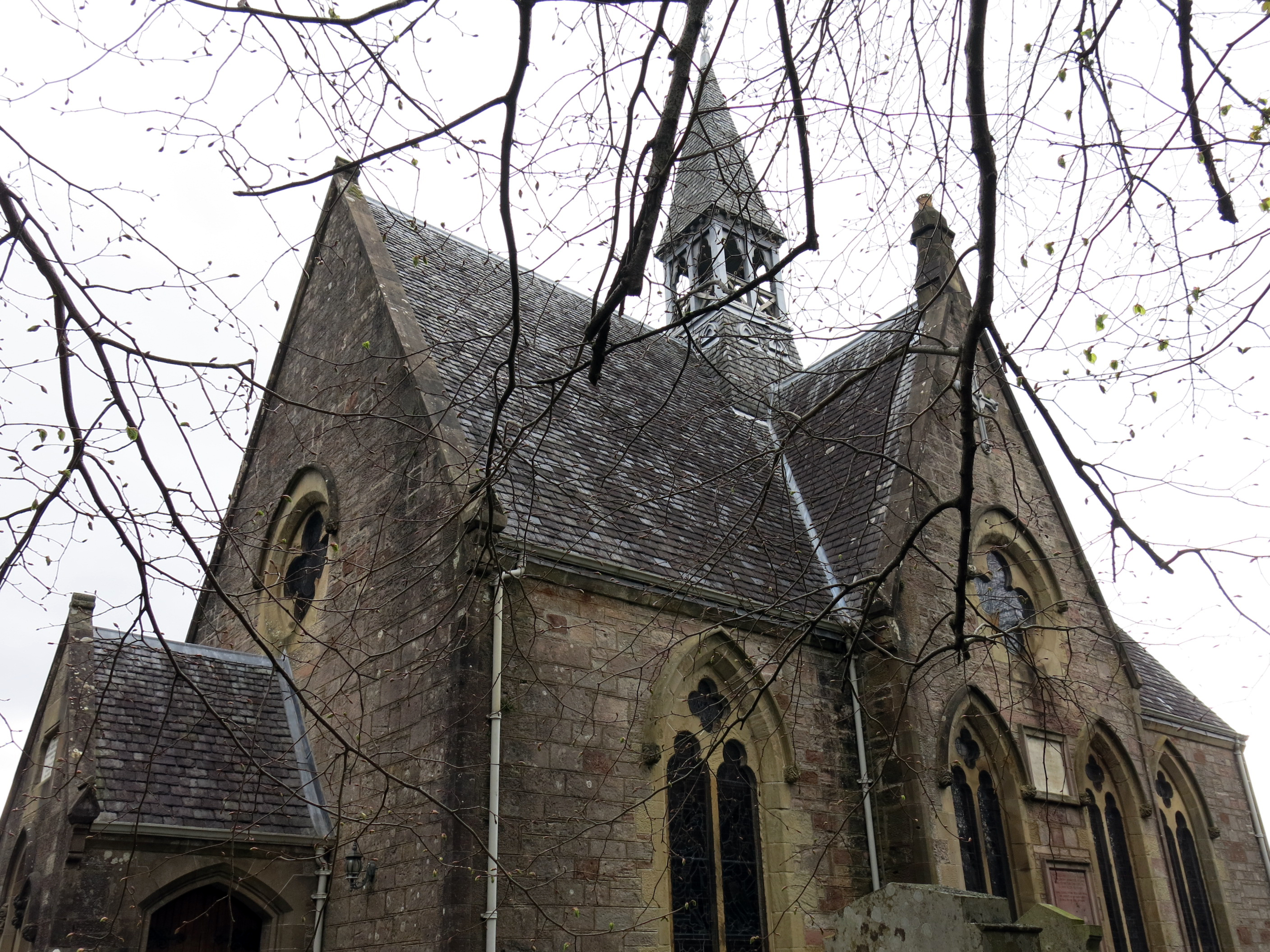
St. Kessog's Church, Luss

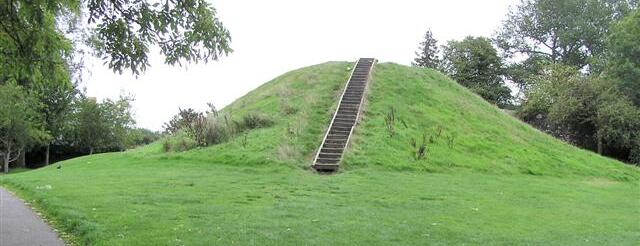
"Tom na Chessaig"

Saint Kessog was an Irish missionary of the mid-sixth century active in the Lennox area and southern Perthshire. Son of the king of Cashel in Ireland, Kessog is said to have worked miracles, even as a child. He left Ireland and became a missionary bishop in Scotland. Using Monks' Island in Loch Lomond as his headquarters, he evangelized the surrounding area until he was martyred, supposedly at Bandry, where a heap of stones was known as St Kessog's Cairn. He was killed in 520 AD.

The St Kessog's church in Luss on the banks of Loch Lomond is named after him and the church contains an effigy of him. There is a Roman Catholic church in the nearby town of Balloch also named after him. Kessog is claimed to have brought Christianity to the area around Luss in 510 AD and 1500 years of continuous Christian presence in the area was celebrated in 2010.

Elsewhere in Scotland, the medieval parish churches of Auchterarder and Comrie, both in Perthshire, were dedicated to Kessog, and may have been founded by him or one of his followers. A 19th century church in Callander is named St Kessog's and a nearby circular mound by the River Teith is named in pseudo-Gaelic as "Tom na Chessaig", meaning "the Hill of Kessog".

The Kessock area of Inverness is named after the saint, as is the Kessog oil field in the North Sea.

Soldiers had a special veneration for him and he's portrayed in military dress with arrows and then bended bow. As late as 1695, his bell, a sacred relic, was listed among the funeral investitures of the Earldom of Perth.

== Sources ==
- Saint of the Day, March 10 at SaintPatrickDC.org
- Page from the Proto-College of St Kessog - A Branch of the Society for Creative Anachronism
- Web Page of Luss Parish Church
- A Brief History of the United Diocese of Glasgow and Galloway, Scottish Episcopal Church
- [Seed of Isaac, Rex Kissack, Norris Modern Press Limited, Douglas, 1986]
- "Saint Kessog, also known as Saint Kessoc or MacKessog"
- "St Kessog, or MacKessog"
- "ST KESSOG – SCOTLAND’S FORGOTTEN FIRST PATRON SAINT"
