= Whinstone =

Quarrying term for any hard dark-coloured rock

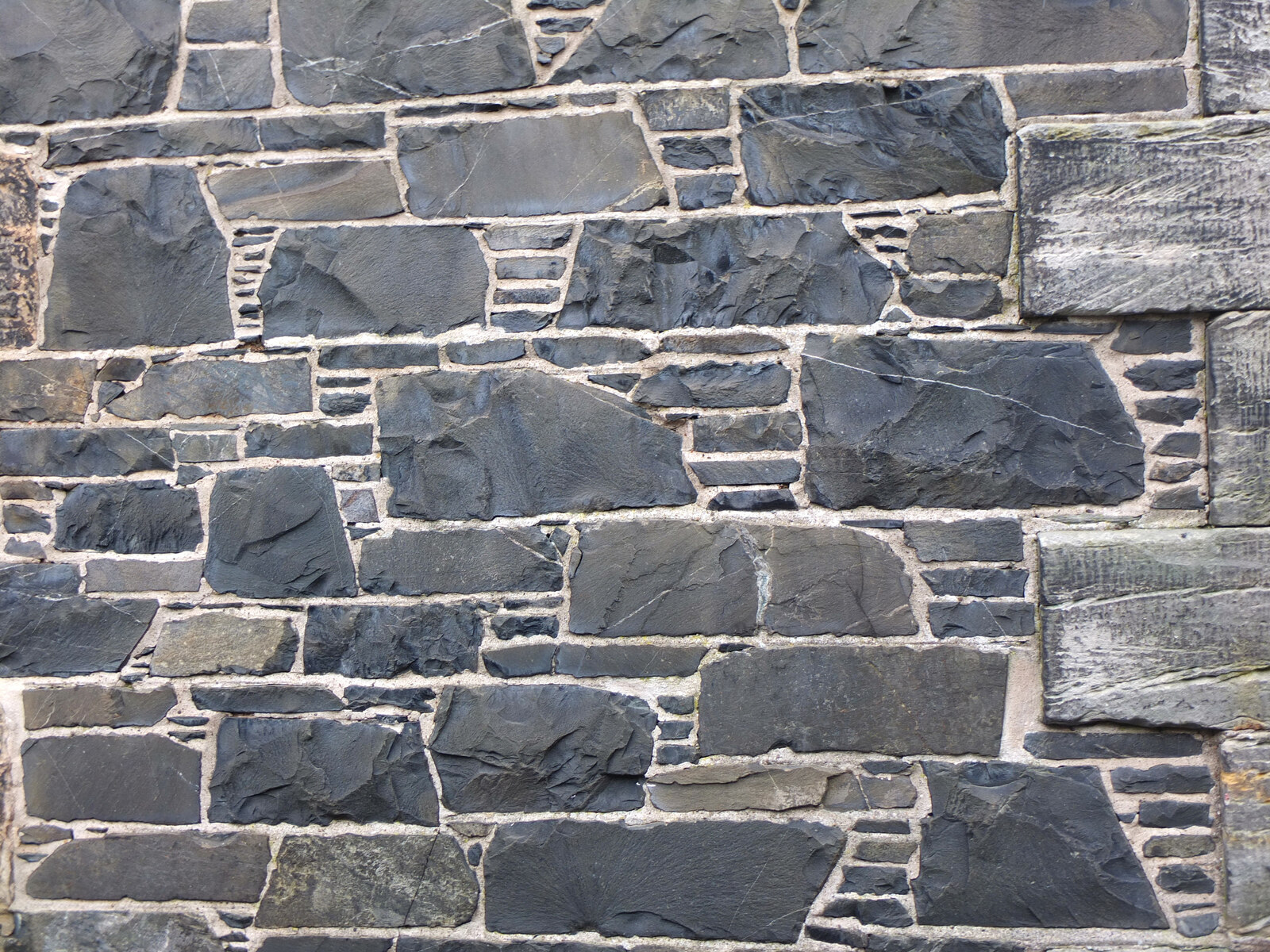
A whinstone wall in Peebles, Scotland

Whinstone is a term used in the quarrying industry to describe any hard dark-coloured rock. Examples include the igneous rocks, basalt and dolerite, as well as the sedimentary rock chert.

== Etymology ==
The Northern English/Scots term whin is first attested in the fourteenth century, and the compound whinstone from the sixteenth. The Oxford English Dictionary concludes that the etymology of whin is obscure, though it has been claimed, fancifully, that the term 'whin' derives from the sound it makes when struck with a hammer.

== Description ==
Massive outcrops of whinstone occur at the Pentland Hills, Scotland and the Whin Sills, England.

It is used for road chippings and dry stone walls, but its natural angular shapes do not fit together well and are not easy to build with, and its hardness makes it a difficult material to work. A common use is in the laying of patios and driveways in its ground/by product state called Whindust.
