= Luss =

Village in Argyll and Bute, Scotland

Coordinates: 56.101491°N 4.6422516°W

Luss: Scottish Gaelic: Lus
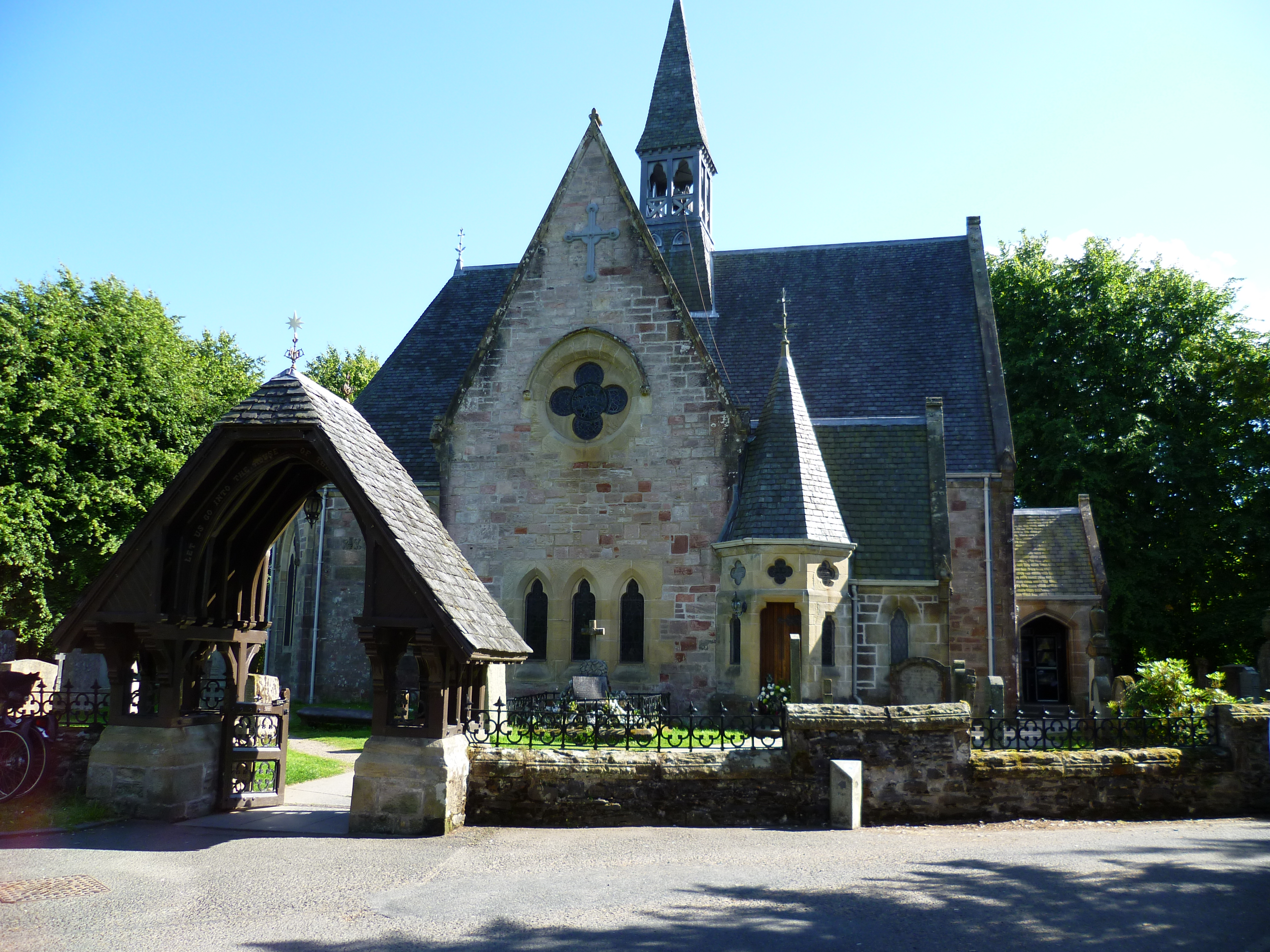
- Luss Parish Church

- Location within Argyll and Bute
- Population: 450
- OS grid reference: NS 35756 93004
- Council area: Argyll and Bute
- Country: Scotland
- Sovereign state: United Kingdom
- Post town: Alexandria
- Postcode district: G83
- Dialling code: 01436
- UK Parliament: Argyll, Bute and South Lochaber
- Scottish Parliament: Dumbarton

Luss (Scottish Gaelic: Lus, 'plant') is a village in Argyll and Bute, Scotland, on the west bank of Loch Lomond. The village is within the Loch Lomond and The Trossachs National Park.

== History ==
Historically in the County of Dunbarton, its original name is Clachan dhu, or 'dark village'. Ben Lomond, the most southerly Munro, dominates the view north over the loch, and the Luss Hills rise to the west of the village.

Saint Kessog brought Christianity to Luss at the early 6th century in the Early Middle Ages. A number of early medieval and medieval monuments survive in the present churchyard, including simple cross-slabs which may date to as early as the 7th century AD, and a hogback grave-cover of the 11th century. A well-preserved late medieval effigy of a bishop is preserved within the modern church. The present Church of Scotland place of worship was built in 1875 by Sir James Colquhoun, 5th Baronet, in memory of his father, who had drowned in the loch in December 1873. The church is noted for its online services as well as for holding over one hundred weddings per year, mostly for couples from outwith the parish. Luss is the ancestral home of Clan Colquhoun and the McInturners of Luss, a sept of Clan Lamont.

== Places of interest ==
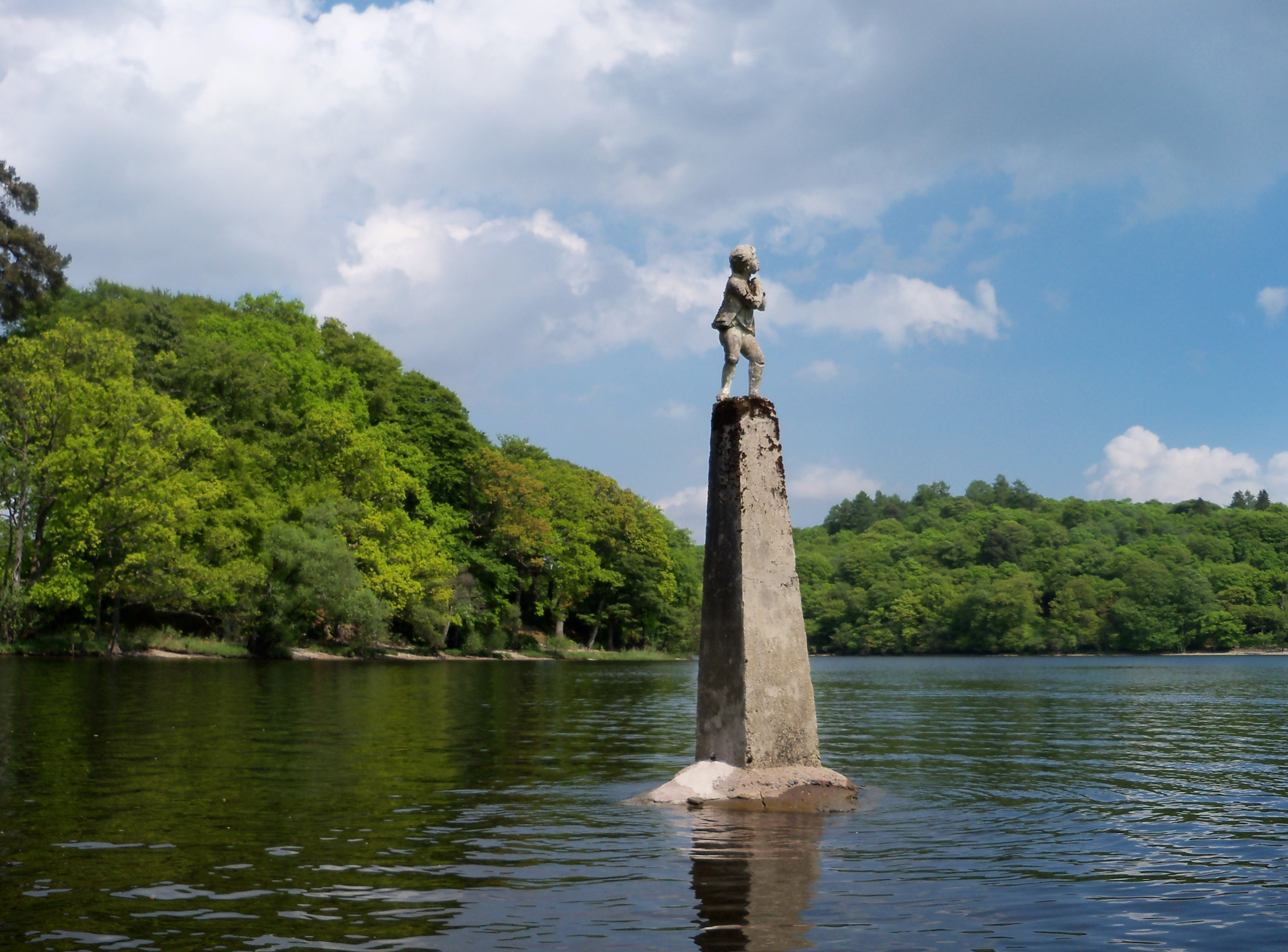
'Wee Peter' statue in Loch Lomond, just to the south of the village

Nowadays Luss is a conservation village, with a bypass carrying the busy A82 trunk road. In its position just off the main road to the West Highlands, it is visited by many tourists, and has a large car and coach park and a number of tourist-oriented shops.

Its Outstanding Conservation Area contains 36 buildings, 24 of which are of Category B or C listed status. Many of Luss' cottages, several of which are located on Pier Road, have been described as picturesque. Five of these are Category B listed, were built in the mid-19th century, and are identical constructions; namely Avonlea and Ivy Bank, Fernlea and Ivy Cottage, Laurel Cottage and Ravenslea, Rose Cottage and The Sheiling and Yewbank and Lonaigview.

Between 1980 and 2003, Luss was the main outdoor filming location for the Scottish Television drama series Take the High Road. Largely as a result of this, the village of 120 residents attracts more than 750,000 visitors each year. Although the programme is no longer made, the village's name in the series, "Glendarroch," is used for some buildings.

The village has a kiltmaker and a bagpipe works.

About a mile south of the village, in a cove at Aldochlay, is a small figure on a stone plinth. A contemporary legend evolved that it is a memorial to a child drowned in the loch, but it was in fact erected in 1890 by a local stonemason, who found the statue in a London scrapyard. 'Wee Peter', as he is locally known, was moved to the site after a brief spell near the railway, and has remained there ever since.

== Facilities ==
The village hosts a water taxi service to Balloch, at the south of the loch, allowing visitors to transfer onwards to Glasgow by train or visit its shopping centre, Lomond Shores. Luss Pier is a popular starting point for boat trips on the loch.

The Loch Lomond Golf Club, which was for a number of years the site of the Barclays Scottish Open, is within the village's borders.

== Gallery ==
Luss
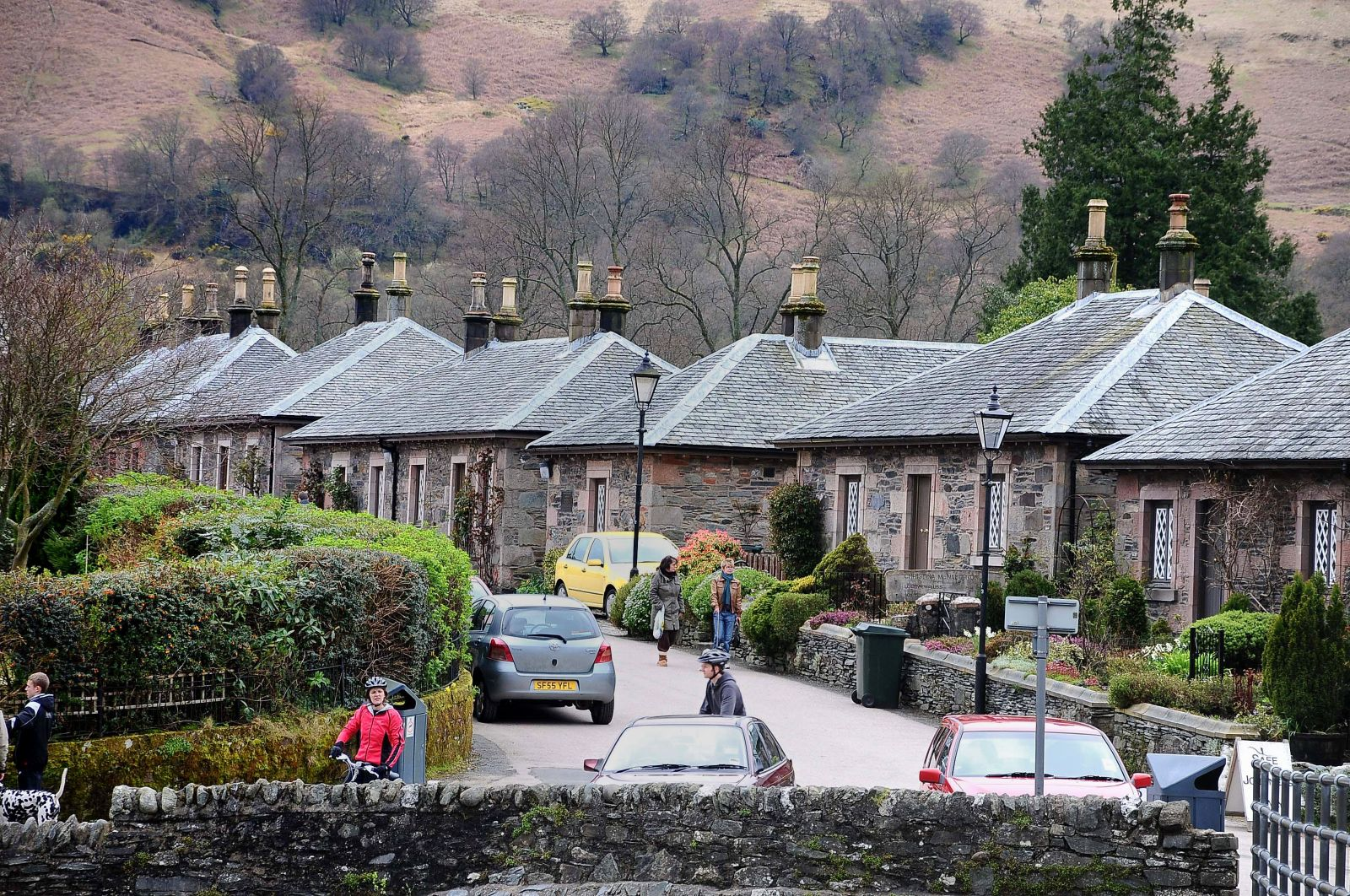
Cottages on Pier Road, viewed from Loch Lomond

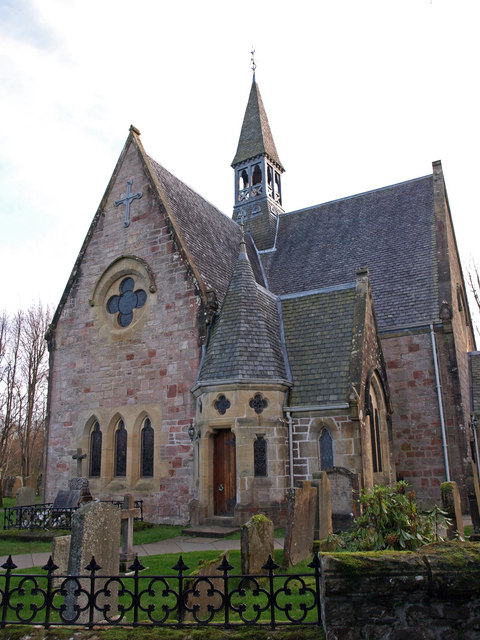
Luss Parish Church

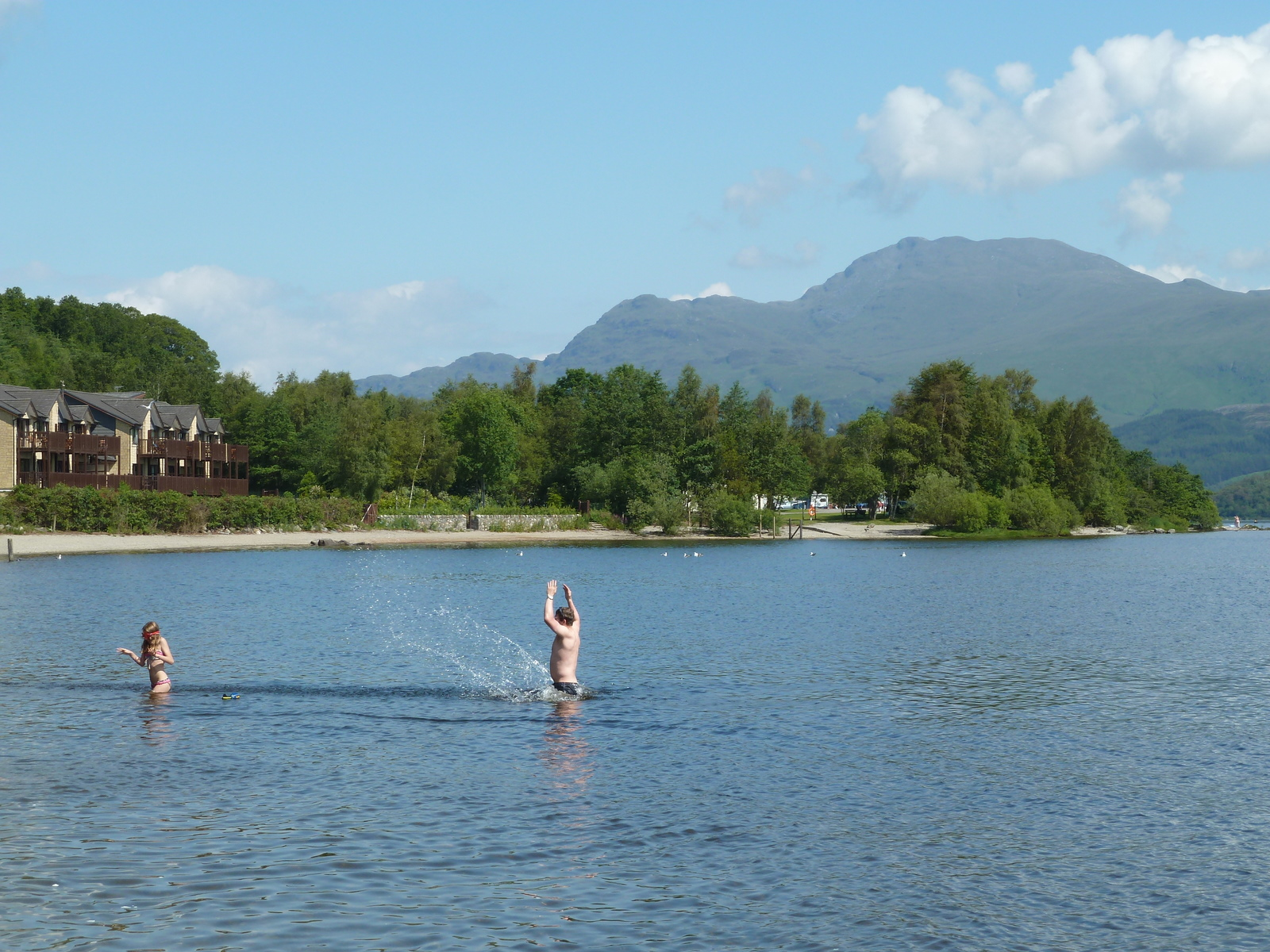
Luss shoreline from Loch Lomond

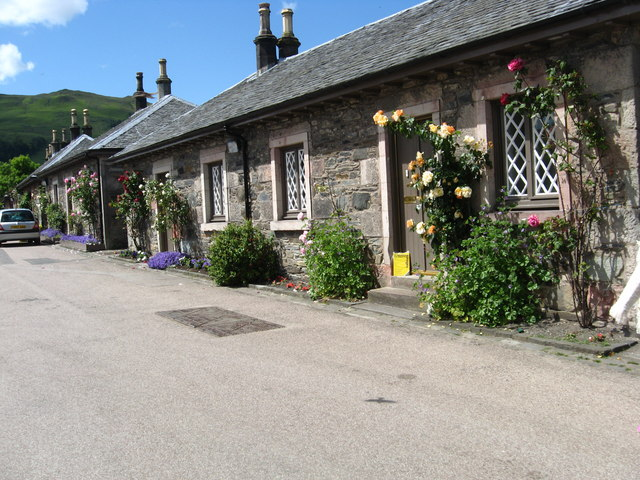
Colourful cottages at Luss

== See also ==
- List of listed buildings in Luss
- Colquhoun baronets
