= List of United Kingdom locations: Mid-Mig =

The United Kingdom

This is part of the list of United Kingdom locations: a gazetteer of place names in the United Kingdom showing each place's locality and geographical coordinates.

== Mi (continued) ==
=== Mid-Mig ===
Location	Locality	Coordinates (links to map & photo sources)	OS grid reference
Midanbury	City of Southampton	50.92°N 01.36°W	SU4514
Mid Ardlaw	Aberdeenshire	57.65°N 02.10°W	NJ9463
Mid Auchinleck	Inverclyde	55.92°N 04.67°W	NS3373
Midbea	Orkney Islands	59.27°N 02.98°W	HY4444
Midbrake	Shetland Islands	60.71°N 01.04°W	HP5204
Mid Calder	West Lothian	55.88°N 03.48°W	NT0767
Mid Clyth	Highland	58.31°N 03.23°W	ND2837
Middle Assendon	Oxfordshire	51.55°N 00.94°W	SU7385
Middle Aston	Oxfordshire	51.93°N 01.31°W	SP4726
Middlebank	Perth and Kinross	56.42°N 03.21°W	NO2527
Middle Barton	Oxfordshire	51.92°N 01.37°W	SP4325
Middle Bickenhill	Solihull	52.44°N 01.70°W	SP2083
Middlebie	Dumfries and Galloway	55.07°N 03.23°W	NY2176
Middle Bockhampton	Dorset	50.76°N 01.76°W	SZ1796
Middle Bourne	Surrey	51.18°N 00.79°W	SU8444
Middle Bridge	North Somerset	51.47°N 02.76°W	ST4775
Middlebridge	Perth and Kinross	56.77°N 03.85°W	NN8766
Middle Brighty	Angus	56.53°N 02.91°W	NO4438
Middle Burnham	Somerset	51.23°N 02.98°W	ST3149
Middlecave	North Yorkshire	54.12°N 00.82°W	SE7771
Middle Chinnock	Somerset	50.91°N 02.75°W	ST4713
Middle Claydon	Buckinghamshire	51.91°N 00.95°W	SP7225
Middle Cliff	Staffordshire	53.08°N 02.00°W	SK0054
Middlecliffe	Barnsley	53.54°N 01.36°W	SE4205
Middlecott (Chagford)	Devon	50.65°N 03.82°W	SX7186
Middlecott (Morchard Bishop)	Devon	50.84°N 03.77°W	SS7507
Middlecott (near Holemoor)	Devon	50.82°N 04.25°W	SS4105
Middle Crackington	Cornwall	50.72°N 04.62°W	SX1595
Middlecroft	Derbyshire	53.25°N 01.37°W	SK4273
Middle Duntisbourne	Gloucestershire	51.75°N 02.03°W	SO9806
Middlefield	City of Aberdeen	57.16°N 02.16°W	NJ9008
Middlefield	Falkirk	56.00°N 03.78°W	NS8980
Middleforth Green	Lancashire	53.73°N 02.72°W	SD5227
Middle Grange	Aberdeenshire	57.50°N 01.81°W	NK1146
Middle Green	Somerset	50.96°N 03.24°W	ST1319
Middle Green	Suffolk	52.25°N 00.54°E	TL7465
Middle Green	Buckinghamshire	51.51°N 00.56°W	TQ0080
Middleham	North Yorkshire	54.27°N 01.81°W	SE1287
Middle Handley	Derbyshire	53.28°N 01.40°W	SK4077
Middle Harling	Norfolk	52.42°N 00.91°E	TL9885
Middle Herrington	Sunderland	54.87°N 01.45°W	NZ3553
Middle Hill	Pembrokeshire	51.76°N 04.97°W	SM9511
Middle Hill	Staffordshire	52.66°N 02.06°W	SJ9607
Middlehill	Cornwall	50.49°N 04.42°W	SX2869
Middlehill	Wiltshire	51.41°N 02.27°W	ST8168
Middlehope	Shropshire	52.48°N 02.75°W	SO4988
Middle Kames	Argyll and Bute	56.04°N 05.35°W	NR9189
Middle Littleton	Worcestershire	52.11°N 01.89°W	SP0746
Middle Luxton	Devon	50.88°N 03.13°W	ST2010
Middle Madeley	Staffordshire	53.00°N 02.34°W	SJ7745
Middle Maes-coed	Herefordshire	51.99°N 02.97°W	SO3333
Middlemarsh	Dorset	50.86°N 02.47°W	ST6707
Middle Marwood	Devon	51.12°N 04.10°W	SS5338
Middle Mayfield	Staffordshire	52.99°N 01.79°W	SK1444
Middle Mill	Pembrokeshire	51.88°N 05.19°W	SM8025
Middlemoor (Whitchurch)	Devon	50.52°N 04.13°W	SX4972
Middle Moor (Exeter)	Devon	50.72°N 03.48°W	SX9592
Middlemuir (near New Pitsligo)	Aberdeenshire	57.60°N 02.16°W	NJ9057
Middlemuir (Valley of Deer)	Aberdeenshire	57.47°N 02.23°W	NJ8643
Middle Park	Greenwich	51.445°N 0.04°E	TQ417738
Middleport	City of Stoke-on-Trent	53.03°N 02.21°W	SJ8649
Middle Quarter	Kent	51.11°N 00.69°E	TQ8938
Middlequarter	Western Isles	57.64°N 07.36°W	NF8074
Middle Rainton	Sunderland	54.81°N 01.48°W	NZ3347
Middle Rasen	Lincolnshire	53.38°N 00.37°W	TF0889
Middlerig	Falkirk	55.97°N 03.74°W	NS9177
Middle Rocombe	Devon	50.51°N 03.55°W	SX9069
Middlesbrough	Middlesbrough	54.55°N 01.21°W	NZ5118
Middlesceugh	Cumbria	54.76°N 02.93°W	NY4041
Middleshaw	Dumfries and Galloway	55.06°N 03.34°W	NY1475
Middleshaw	Cumbria	54.29°N 02.69°W	SD5589
Middle Side	Durham	54.62°N 02.10°W	NY9326
Middlesmoor	North Yorkshire	54.16°N 01.86°W	SE0974
Middle Stoford	Somerset	50.98°N 03.16°W	ST1821
Middle Stoke	Coventry	52.40°N 01.48°W	SP3579
Middle Stoke	Kent	51.44°N 00.63°E	TQ8375
Middlestone	Durham	54.67°N 01.61°W	NZ2531
Middlestone Moor	Durham	54.68°N 01.62°W	NZ2432
Middle Stoughton	Somerset	51.23°N 02.83°W	ST4249
Middlestown	Wakefield	53.64°N 01.60°W	SE2617
Middle Street	Gloucestershire	51.73°N 02.33°W	SO7704
Middle Taphouse	Cornwall	50.43°N 04.57°W	SX1763
Middlethorpe	East Riding of Yorkshire	53.90°N 00.64°W	SE8945
Middlethorpe	York	53.92°N 01.10°W	SE5948
Middleton	Angus	56.62°N 02.68°W	NO5848
Middleton	Argyll and Bute	56.47°N 06.97°W	NL9443
Middleton	Cumbria	54.26°N 02.58°W	SD6286
Middleton or Middleton-by-Wirksworth (Matlock)	Derbyshire	53.10°N 01.59°W	SK2756
Middleton or Middleton-by-Youlgreave (Bakewell)	Derbyshire	53.16°N 01.71°W	SK1963
Middleton	Essex	52.01°N 00.72°E	TL8739
Middleton	Hampshire	51.19°N 01.40°W	SU4244
Middleton	Hartlepool	54.68°N 01.19°W	NZ5233
Middleton	Herefordshire	52.31°N 02.67°W	SO5469
Middleton	Isle of Wight	50.67°N 01.53°W	SZ3386
Middleton	Lancashire	54.01°N 02.88°W	SD4258
Middleton	Leeds	53.73°N 01.56°W	SE2927
Middleton	Midlothian	55.80°N 03.02°W	NT3657
Middleton	Milton Keynes	52.04°N 00.70°W	SP8939
Middleton	Norfolk	52.71°N 00.45°E	TF6616
Middleton	Northamptonshire	52.50°N 00.77°W	SP8390
Middleton (near Belford)	Northumberland	55.60°N 01.84°W	NU1035
Middleton (Wallington Demesne)	Northumberland	55.15°N 01.90°W	NZ0685
Middleton (Craven)	North Yorkshire	53.88°N 02.06°W	SD9643
Middleton (Harrogate)	North Yorkshire	53.94°N 01.81°W	SE1249
Middleton (Ryedale)	North Yorkshire	54.25°N 00.80°W	SE7885
Middleton	Rochdale	53.55°N 02.19°W	SD8706
Middleton (Bitterley, near Ludlow)	Shropshire	52.38°N 02.69°W	SO5377
Middleton (Oswestry)	Shropshire	52.85°N 03.02°W	SJ3129
Middleton	Suffolk	52.24°N 01.55°E	TM4367
Middleton	Swansea	51.55°N 04.28°W	SS4287
Middleton	Warwickshire	52.57°N 01.75°W	SP1798
Middleton Baggot	Shropshire	52.50°N 02.56°W	SO6290
Middleton Cheney	Northamptonshire	52.06°N 01.27°W	SP5041
Middleton Green	Staffordshire	52.91°N 02.01°W	SJ9935
Middleton Hall	Northumberland	55.51°N 02.03°W	NT9825
Middleton-in-Teesdale	Durham	54.62°N 02.09°W	NY9425
Middleton Junction	Rochdale	53.53°N 02.18°W	SD8804
Middleton Moor	Suffolk	52.24°N 01.52°E	TM4167
Middleton of Dalrulzian	Perth and Kinross	56.70°N 03.42°W	NO1358
Middleton One Row	Darlington	54.50°N 01.46°W	NZ3512
Middleton-on-Leven	North Yorkshire	54.47°N 01.29°W	NZ4609
Middleton-on-Sea	West Sussex	50.79°N 00.62°W	SU9700
Middleton on the Hill	Herefordshire	52.27°N 02.67°W	SO5464
Middleton on the Wolds	East Riding of Yorkshire	53.92°N 00.56°W	SE9449
Middleton Park	City of Aberdeen	57.19°N 02.13°W	NJ9211
Middleton Place	Cumbria	54.31°N 03.40°W	SD0992
Middleton Priors	Shropshire	52.50°N 02.56°W	SO6290
Middleton Quernhow	North Yorkshire	54.19°N 01.49°W	SE3378
Middleton Scriven	Shropshire	52.48°N 02.47°W	SO6887
Middleton St George	Darlington	54.51°N 01.47°W	NZ3413
Middleton Stoney	Oxfordshire	51.90°N 01.23°W	SP5323
Middleton Tyas	North Yorkshire	54.44°N 01.66°W	NZ2205
Middle Town (St Agnes)	Isles of Scilly	49.89°N 06.34°W	SV8807
Middle Town (St Martin's)	Isles of Scilly	49.96°N 06.29°W	SV9216
Middletown	Warwickshire	52.25°N 01.91°W	SP0662
Middletown	North Somerset	51.43°N 02.79°W	ST4571
Middletown	Cumbria	54.45°N 03.55°W	NX9908
Middletown	Powys	52.70°N 03.03°W	SJ3012
Middle Tysoe	Warwickshire	52.09°N 01.51°W	SP3344
Middle Wallop	Hampshire	51.13°N 01.58°W	SU2937
Middle Weald	Milton Keynes	52.03°N 00.84°W	SP7938
Middlewich	Cheshire	53.19°N 02.45°W	SJ7066
Middle Wick	Gloucestershire	51.66°N 02.42°W	ST7196
Middlewick	Wiltshire	51.43°N 02.21°W	ST8571
Middle Winterslow	Wiltshire	51.08°N 01.67°W	SU2332
Middlewood	Cornwall	50.54°N 04.44°W	SX2775
Middlewood	Sheffield	53.42°N 01.53°W	SK3192
Middlewood	Cheshire	53.35°N 02.09°W	SJ9484
Middle Woodford	Wiltshire	51.12°N 01.84°W	SU1136
Middlewood Green	Suffolk	52.20°N 01.05°E	TM0961
Middleyard	Gloucestershire	51.72°N 02.26°W	SO8203
Middlezoy	Somerset	51.08°N 02.90°W	ST3732
Middridge	Durham	54.62°N 01.61°W	NZ2526
Midelney	Somerset	50.99°N 02.84°W	ST4122
Midfield	Highland	58.54°N 04.44°W	NC5864
Midford	Bath and North East Somerset	51.33°N 02.36°W	ST7560
Midgard	Scottish Borders	55.43°N 02.71°W	NT5516
Midge Hall	Lancashire	53.70°N 02.74°W	SD5123
Midgehole	Calderdale	53.74°N 02.01°W	SD9928
Midgeholme	Cumbria	54.91°N 02.57°W	NY6358
Midgham	Berkshire	51.39°N 01.21°W	SU5567
Midgham Green	Berkshire	51.39°N 01.19°W	SU5667
Midgley	Calderdale	53.73°N 01.97°W	SE0226
Midgley	West Yorkshire	53.62°N 01.59°W	SE2714
Mid Ho	Shetland Islands	60.64°N 01.01°W	HU5496
Mid Holmwood	Surrey	51.20°N 00.34°W	TQ1646
Midhopestones	Sheffield	53.48°N 01.65°W	SK2399
Midhurst	West Sussex	50.98°N 00.74°W	SU8821
Mid Lambrook	Somerset	50.95°N 02.82°W	ST4218
Midland	Orkney Islands	58.91°N 03.18°W	HY3204
Mid Lavant	West Sussex	50.86°N 00.79°W	SU8508
Midlem	Scottish Borders	55.53°N 02.76°W	NT5227
Midlock	South Lanarkshire	55.47°N 03.66°W	NS9521
Mid Murthat	Dumfries and Galloway	55.27°N 03.43°W	NY0999
Midsomer Norton	Bath and North East Somerset	51.28°N 02.48°W	ST6654
Mid Strome	Highland	57.36°N 05.56°W	NG8636
Midton	Inverclyde	55.94°N 04.83°W	NS2376
Midtown (Melness, Sutherland)	Highland	58.51°N 04.43°W	NC5861
Midtown (Loch Ewe)	Highland	57.80°N 05.67°W	NG8285
Midville	Lincolnshire	53.08°N 00.05°E	TF3856
Mid Walls	Shetland Islands	60.23°N 01.64°W	HU2050
Midway	Somerset	51.21°N 02.50°W	ST6546
Midway	Cheshire	53.33°N 02.13°W	SJ9182
Mid Yell	Shetland Islands	60.59°N 01.07°W	HU5190
Migdale	Highland	57.89°N 04.33°W	NH6292
Migvie	Aberdeenshire	57.14°N 02.94°W	NJ4306
