= Middlemoor =

Middlemoor may refer to two places in England:

- Middlemoor, Whitchurch, a location in Whitchurch parish, Devon
- Middle Moor or Middlemoor, an area of St Loyes ward, Exeter, Devon

== See also ==
- Middlesmoor, a village in North Yorkshire, England
