= Boglestone =

Coordinates: 55.92649°N 4.66965°W

Boglestone (named after the Bogal Stone) is located around the top of the Clune Brae, Port Glasgow, Inverclyde, Scotland. The area includes housing, but also serves as an important 'hub' for upper Port Glasgow, offering amenities such as education, shopping, health centres, and leisure.

The two schools previously situated here were Boglestone Primary a non-denominational school, and St Michael's a Roman Catholic primary School. Due to the local council's education plans, Boglestone Primary was demolished, with pupils temporarily transferred to other schools, including Highholm Primary, located near Port Glasgow town centre. Newark Primary School (opened 2008) now stands on the site.

Shops include a Co-op supermarket, newsagents, and bakers, as well as Ladbrokes bookmakers. A health centre, and a community centre that includes a gym, are also situated here. Boglestone shops provide a shopping centre for Boglestone, the only area of upper Port Glasgow to have close access to such a wide variety of retailers.

Boglestone Photo Gallery

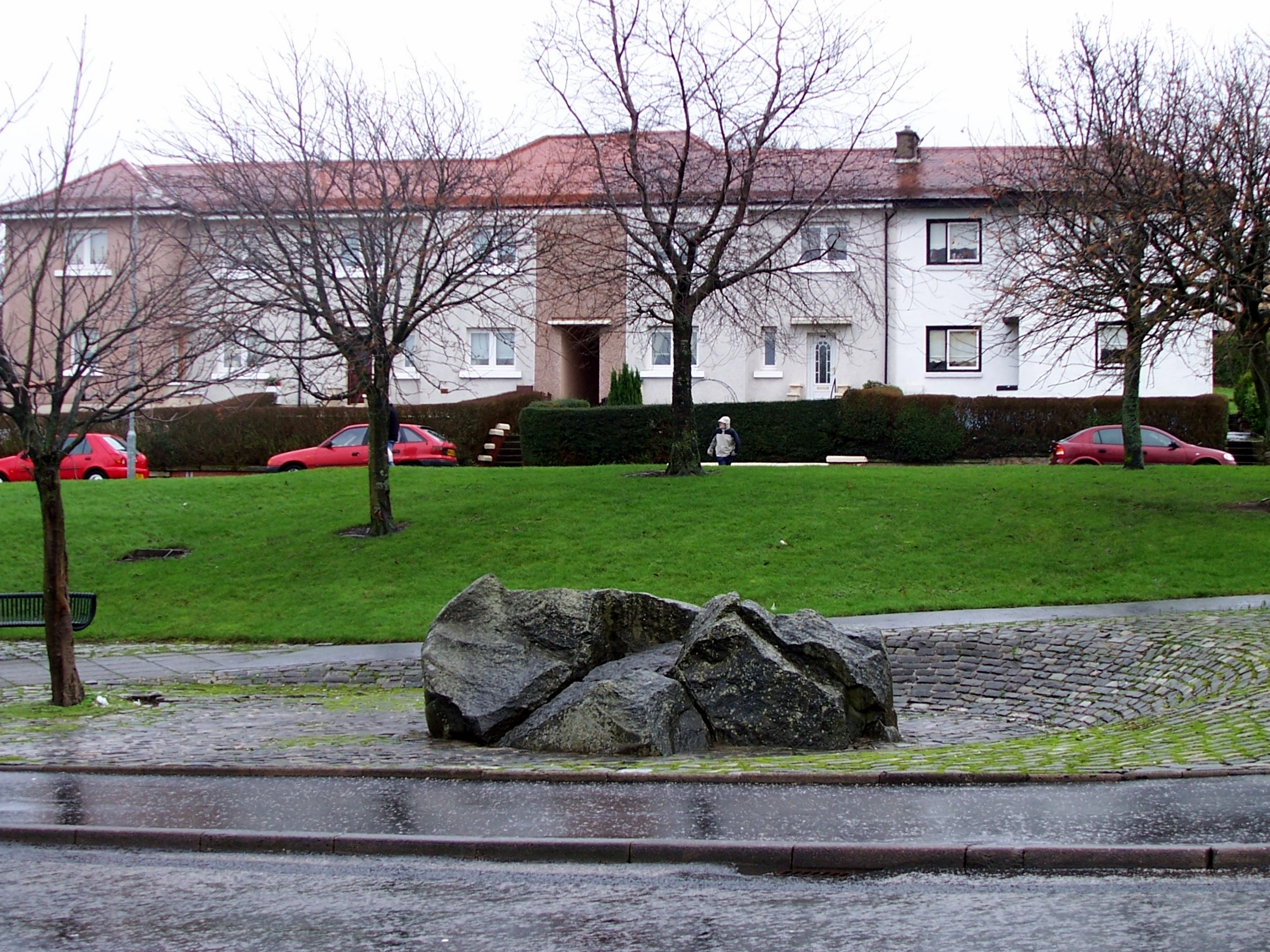
The Bogle Stone and Southfield Avenue

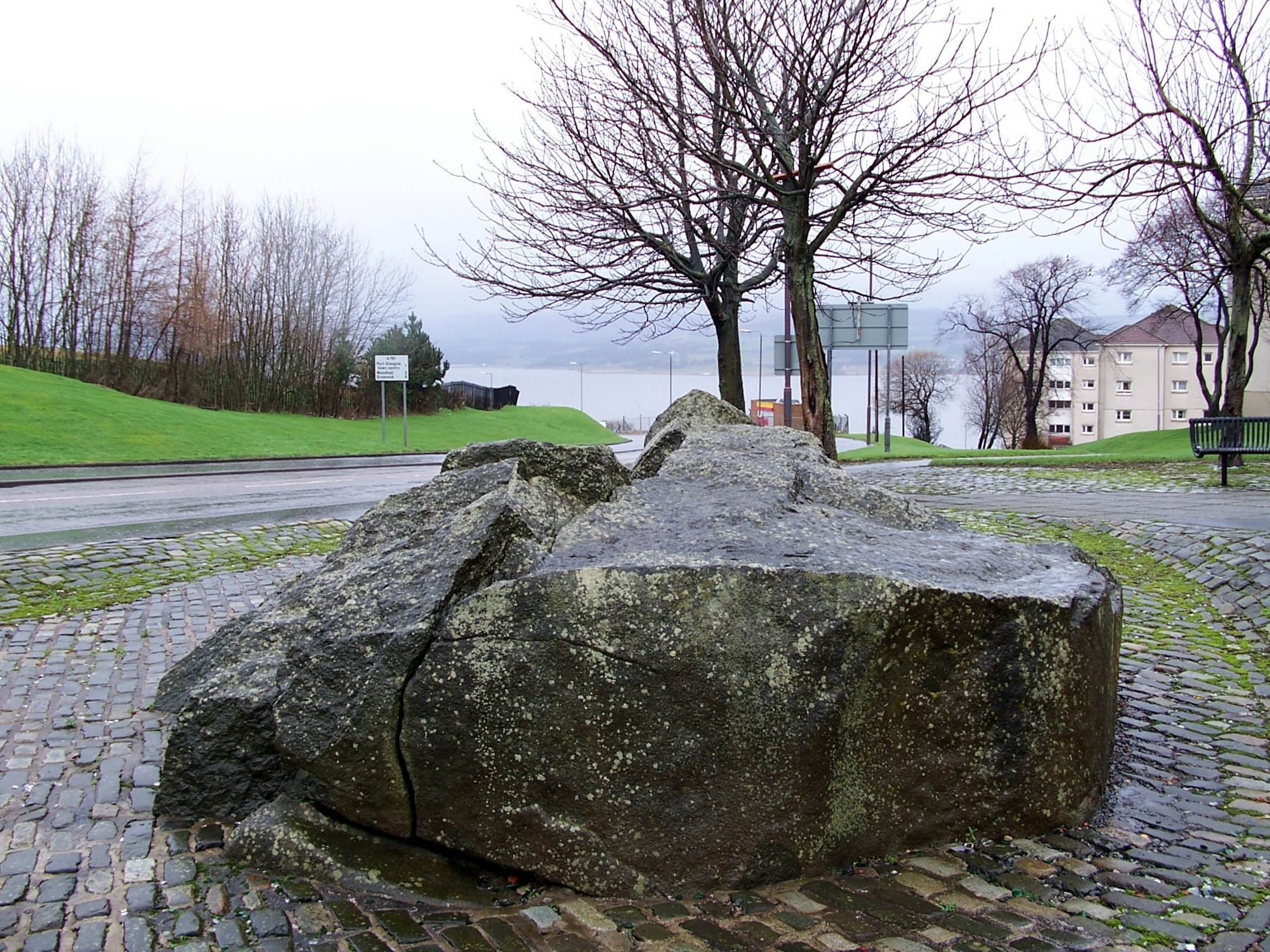
The Bogle Stone and the A761 Clune Brae

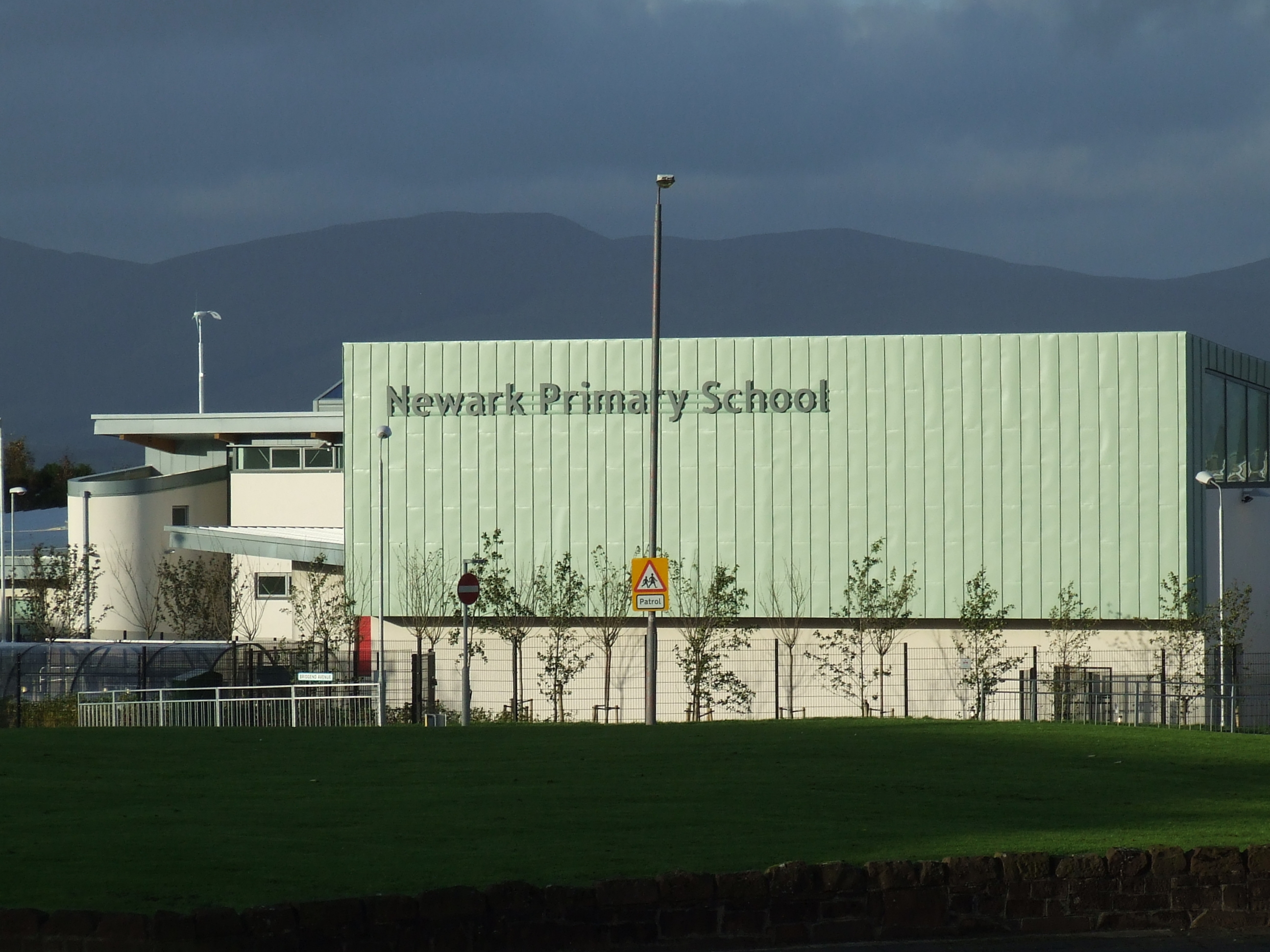
Newark Primary School, Port Glasgow

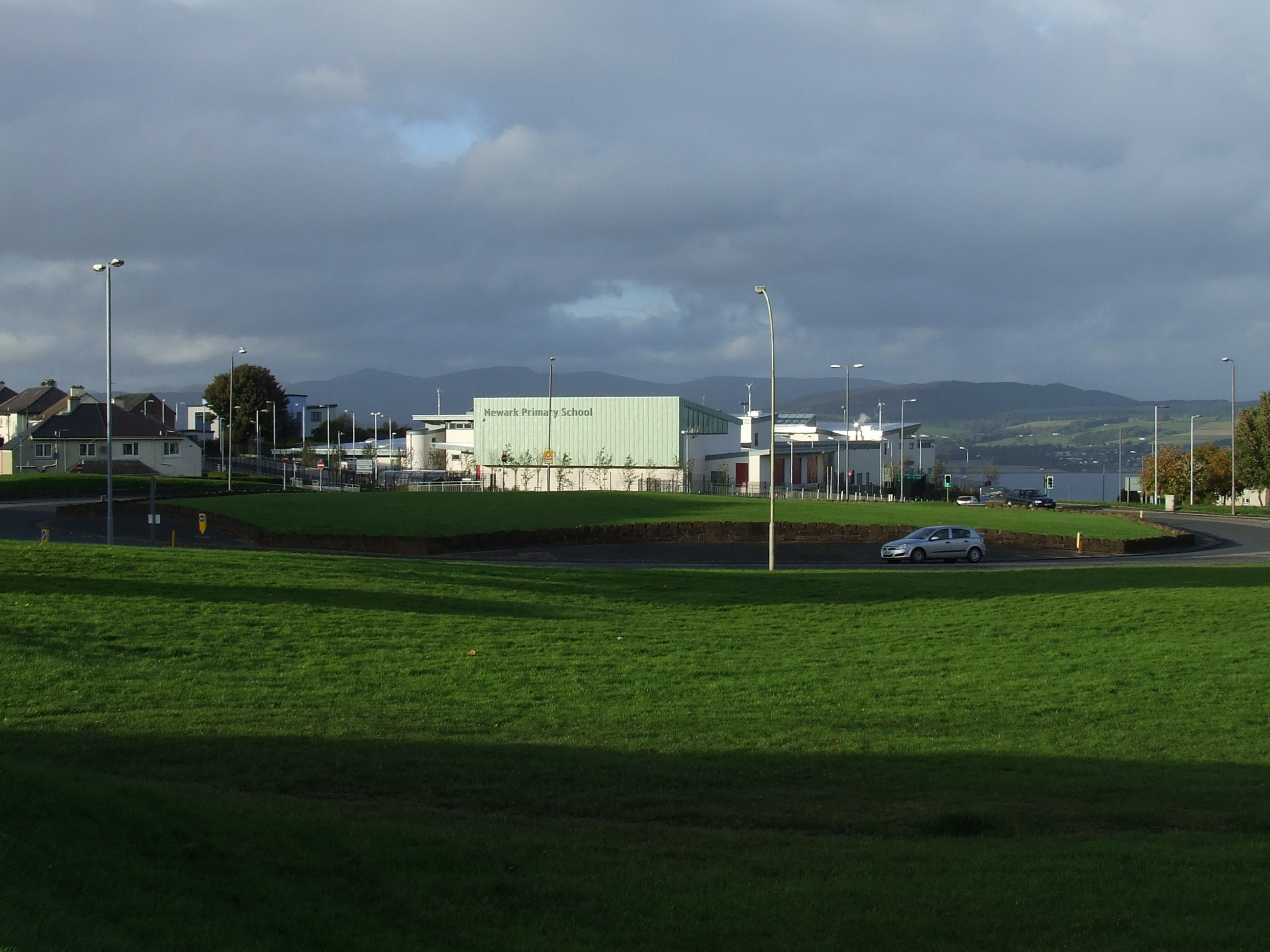
Newark Primary School and Boglestone Roundabout, Port Glasgow

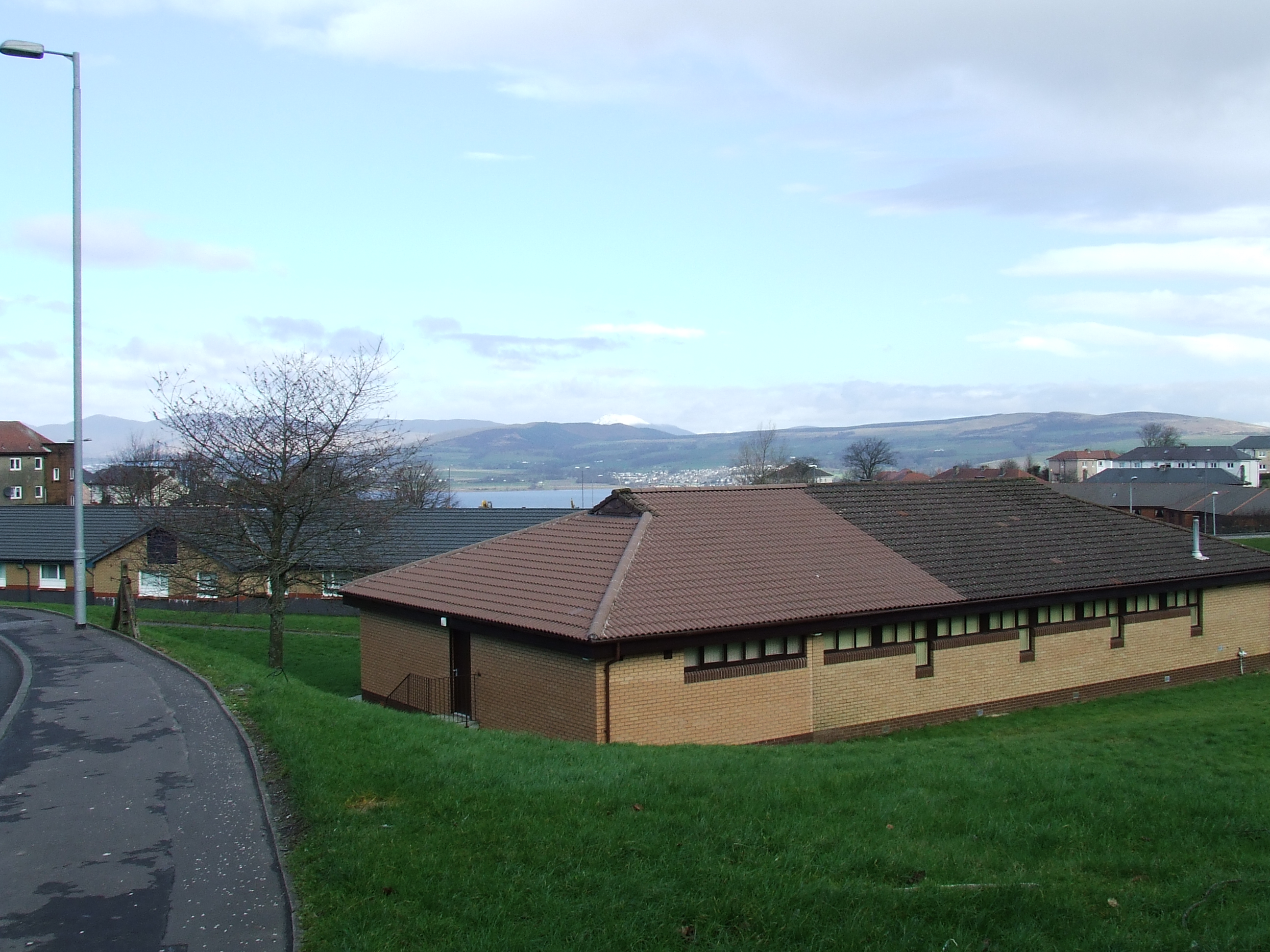
Dubbs Road Medical Centre

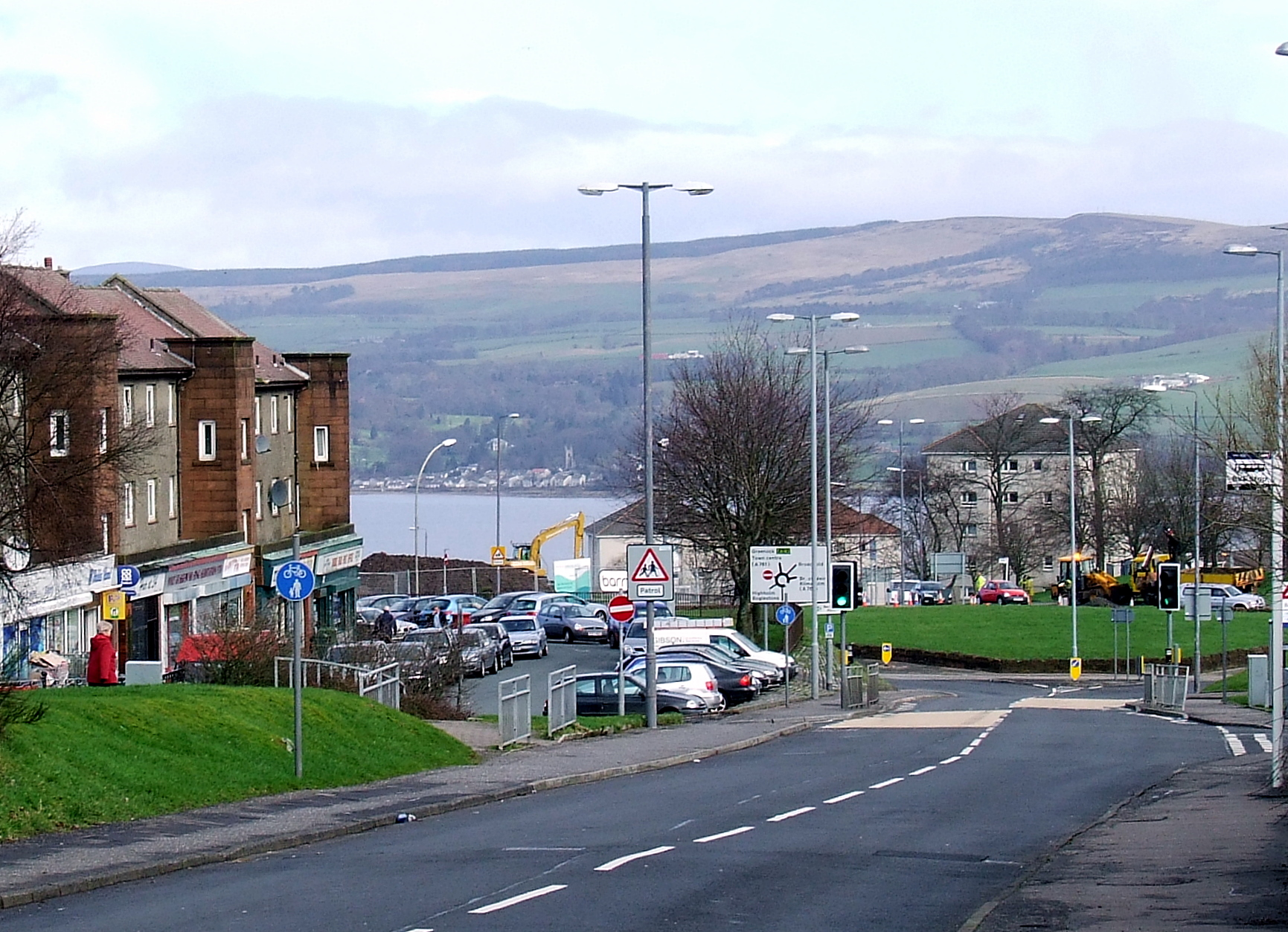
Dubbs Road and Boglestone roundabout
