= Middleton Priors =

Village in Shropshire, England

Coordinates: 52°30′33″N 2°33′26″W

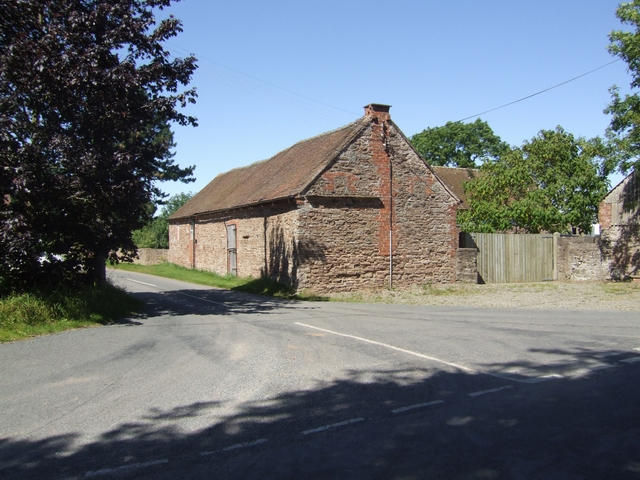
- Barn in Middleton Priors

- Location within Shropshire
- OS grid reference: SO622903
- Civil parish: Ditton Priors
- Unitary authority: Shropshire
- Ceremonial county: Shropshire
- Region: West Midlands
- Country: England
- Sovereign state: United Kingdom
- Post town: BRIDGNORTH
- Postcode district: WV16
- Dialling code: 01746
- Police: West Mercia
- Fire: Shropshire
- Ambulance: West Midlands
- UK Parliament: Ludlow

Middleton Priors is a village in Shropshire. The hamlet of Middleton Baggot lies less than a mile to its east. The population is shown under Ditton Priors.

== Etymology ==
The etymology is doubtful. The name was recorded as Mittilton c. 1200.

== See also ==
- Listed buildings in Ditton Priors
