= Park Farm =

Park Farm can refer to:

- Park Farm, Kent
- Park Farm, Port Glasgow
- Park Farm, Worcestershire
