= Port Glasgow =

Town in the Inverclyde council area of Scotland

Coordinates: 55.9340°N 4.6906°W

Port Glasgow: Scottish Gaelic: Port Ghlaschu; Scots: Port Glesga
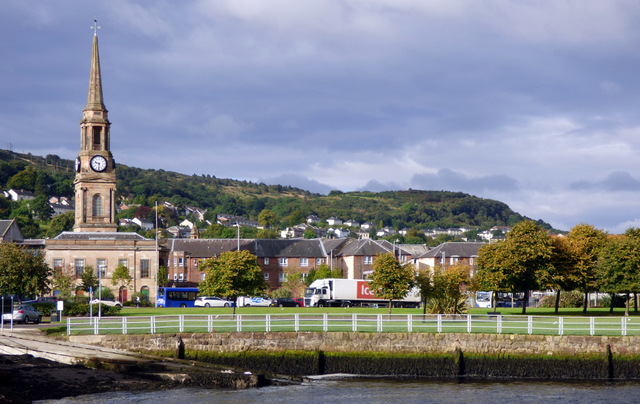
- Port Glasgow

- Location within Inverclyde
- Area: 4.75 km^{2} (1.83 sq mi)
- Population: 14,200 (2020)
  - Density: 2,989/km^{2} (7,740/sq mi)
- OS grid reference: NS321746
  - Edinburgh: 58 mi (93 km)
  - London: 358 mi (576 km)
- Council area: Inverclyde
- Lieutenancy area: Renfrewshire
- Country: Scotland
- Sovereign state: United Kingdom
- Post town: PORT GLASGOW
- Postcode district: PA14
- Dialling code: 01475
- Police: Scotland
- Fire: Scottish
- Ambulance: Scottish
- UK Parliament: Inverclyde and Renfrewshire West
- Scottish Parliament: Greenock and Inverclyde

Port Glasgow (Scottish Gaelic: Port Ghlaschu, pronounced [pʰɔrˠʃt̪ˈɣl̪ˠas̪əxu]) is the second-largest town in the Inverclyde council area of Scotland. The population according to the 1991 census for Port Glasgow was 19,426 persons and in the 2001 census was 16,617 persons. The most recent census in 2011 states that the population has declined to 15,414. It is located immediately to the east of Greenock and was previously a burgh in the county of Renfrewshire.

Originally a fishing hamlet named Newark, Port Glasgow came about as a result of large ships being unable to navigate the shallow and meandering River Clyde to the centre of the city of Glasgow. Because of this, it was formed as a remote port for Glasgow in 1668 and became known as 'New Port Glasgow', which was shortened to 'Port Glasgow' in 1775. Port Glasgow was home to dry docks and shipbuilding beginning in 1780.

The town grew from the central area of the present town and thus many of the town's historic buildings and people are found here. Port Glasgow expanded up the steep hills inland to open fields where areas such as Park Farm, Boglestone, Slaemuir and Devol and Oronsay were founded. This area has subsequently become known as upper Port Glasgow and most of the town's population occupies these areas.

The town received the Carbuncle 'Plook on the Plinth' Award in September 2025 because of its reputation regarding the Clune Park Estate. Though the backlash from its residents caused the award to be officially retired in place of the new 'Heart On Your Sleeve' award, with Port Glasgow named as the first winner.

== History ==
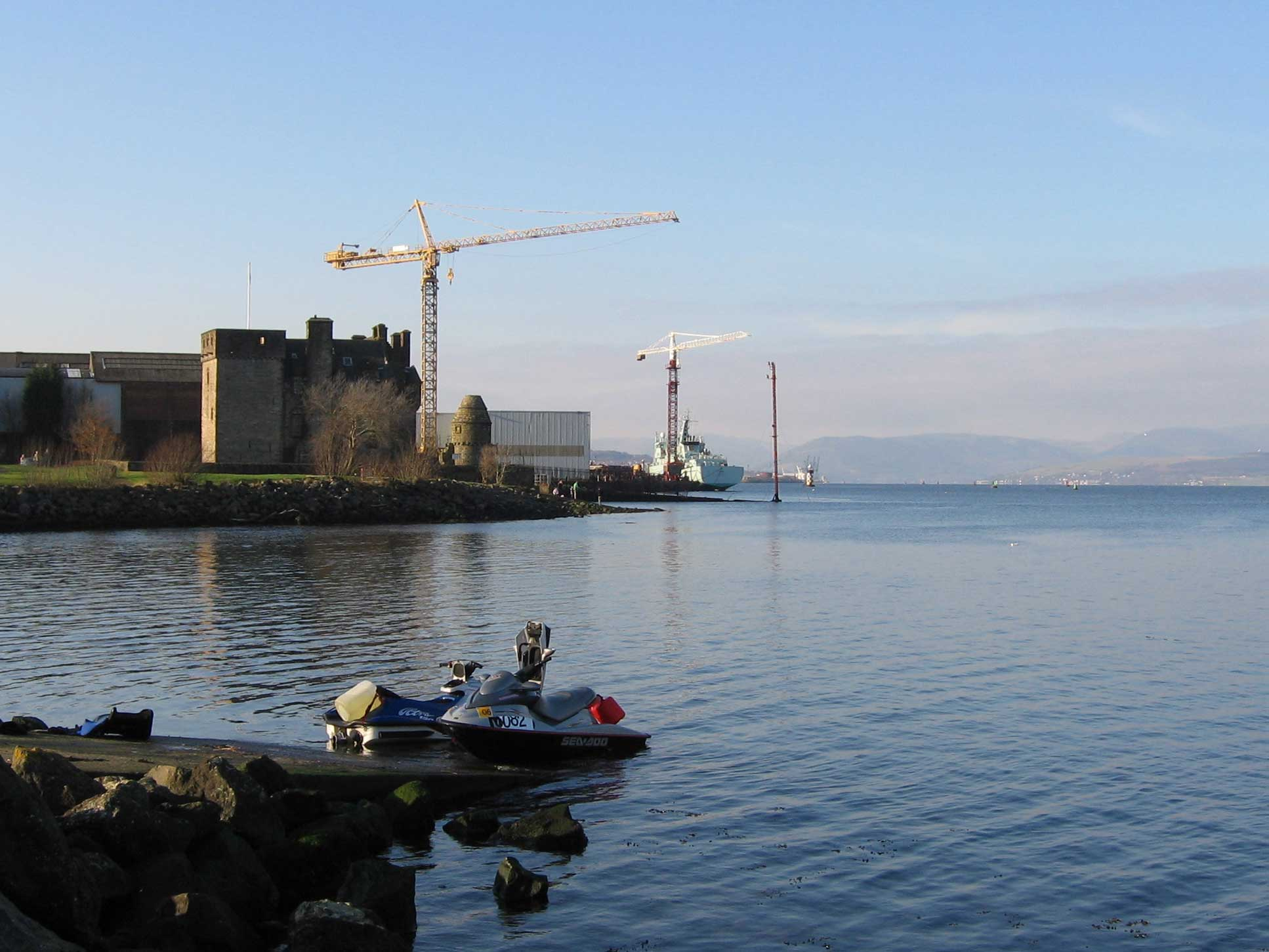
Newark Castle stands close to the last shipyard on the Lower Clyde.

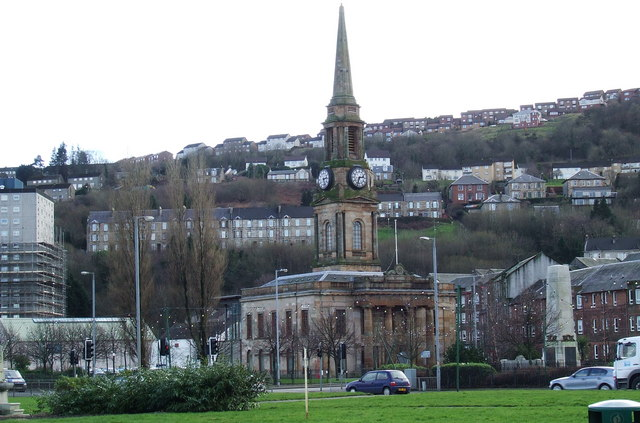
The Town Buildings, viewed from the site of the original harbour which was infilled, and formed Coronation Park in 1937

=== Origins ===
The origins of Port Glasgow go back to the construction by Sir George Maxwell between 1450 and 1477 of the "New Werke of Finlastoun", which became Newark Castle. At a good anchorage near the castle, a small fishing hamlet known as Newark formed, like other scattered hamlets along the shores of the River Clyde. After 1589 the village of Greenock formed just under 4 miles (6 kilometres) to the west of Newark, and gradually became a market town with growing fishing and sea trade, although it had only a jetty in the bay to unload ships. Since seagoing ships could not go further up the Clyde due to sandbanks and shallows, the Glasgow merchants such as the Tobacco Lords wanted harbour access, but got into arguments with Greenock over harbour dues and warehouses. They put a bid in for the Easter Greenock estate for a harbour, but were outbid and the lands became the Barony of Cartsburn. They then negotiated with Sir Patrick Maxwell of Newark Estate, and in 1668 he agreed to feu (lease) to the City of Glasgow 13 acres (5 hectares) of land to the west of the castle, for payment of 1,300 merks and an annual feu duty of four merks. Construction of piers and breakwaters enclosing the harbour began promptly, and Newport Glasgow was constituted as a free port.

Trade prospered quickly, and by 1710 Newport Glasgow had the principal Clyde custom house, initially in Customhouse Lane, then after 1754 in a new building constructed on the west quay of the harbour. Through that century the town became known simply as Port Glasgow. Ships, mostly owned by Glasgow merchants, imported tobacco, sugar, rum, cotton and mahogany from the Americas, as well as timber, iron and hemp from the Baltic. These goods were then taken by road to Glasgow, as was market garden produce from farms around Port Glasgow. A change began in 1773 when the Lang Dyke was constructed to deepen the upper river, and ships increasingly went upriver straight to Glasgow. In 1830, the custom house collected £243,349 3s 1d in revenue, but after that income from the port declined, while by then Greenock had its own customs house.

In the 1690s, the grid-iron street layout, which still forms much of the town centre today, was laid out.

=== Shipbuilding ===
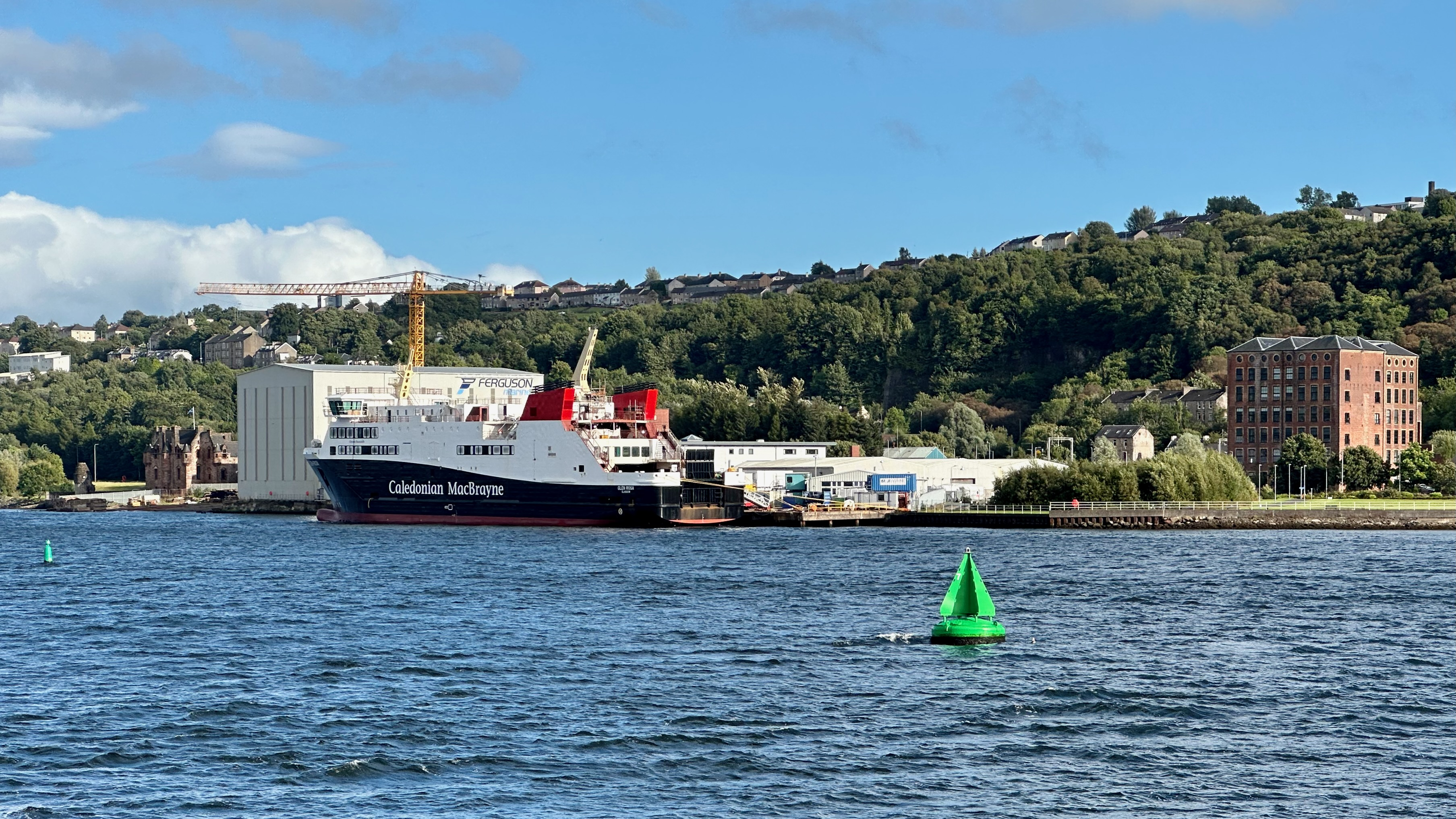
West of Newark Castle, Ferguson Marine now occupies the site of McGill's shipyard. The Bay Yard, in front of Gourock Ropeworks, built the tall ship Glenlee.

In 1780, Thomas McGill set up one of the first shipyards in the area, located near Newark castle. By the 19th century, Port Glasgow had become a centre of shipbuilding. The Comet was built in the town in 1812 and was the first commercial steam vessel in Europe. A replica of the Comet was built in 1962 to mark the 150th anniversary. It, and a plaque commemorating the actual site of construction, were situated in Port Glasgow town centre in 1973.

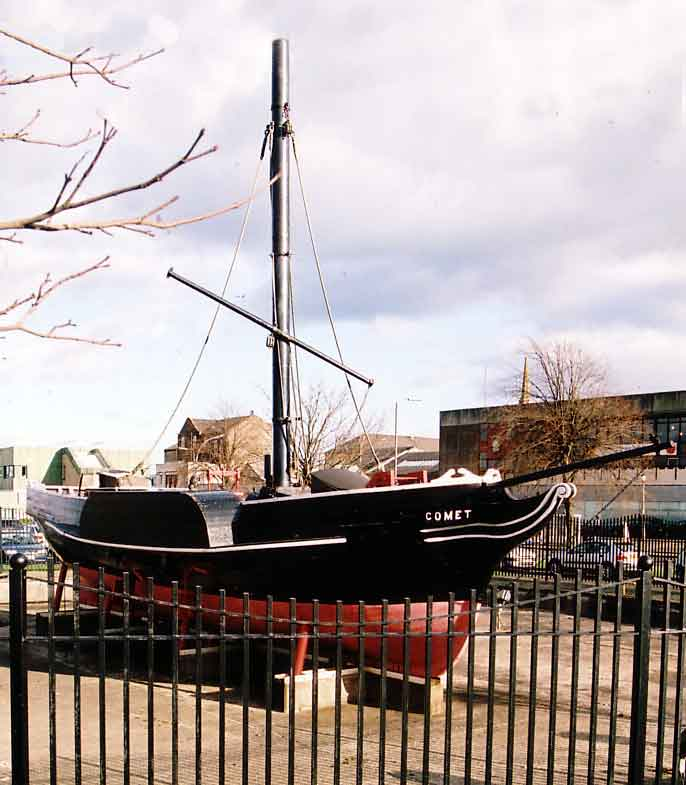
PS Comet, Europe's first commercially successful steamboat, was built in Port Glasgow, and a replica of her made by shipyard apprentices was on display in the town centre until its demolition in 2023.

The Town Buildings were completed in 1815 and Port Glasgow became a parliamentary burgh in 1832, but around this time, the River Clyde up to Glasgow was deepened and new road and rail links meant that the town was no longer needed much as a port. The shipbuilding industry then took over as the main source of employment and prosperity. Port Glasgow has been responsible for about a quarter of the total tonnage of ships launched on the Clyde, and also dealt in scrapping old ships, most notably the French liner L'Atlantique, the burnt out wreck of which was broken up in the yard of Smith & Houston. However, as with most of Inverclyde's industry, the shipbuilding industry has all but gone and only Ferguson Marine, which was nationalised in 2019, remains in the town today.

=== Fishing ===
The Annual Reports of the Fishery Board for Scotland provide an insight into the state of fishing from Port Glasgow in the years before the First World War.

Fishery Statistics

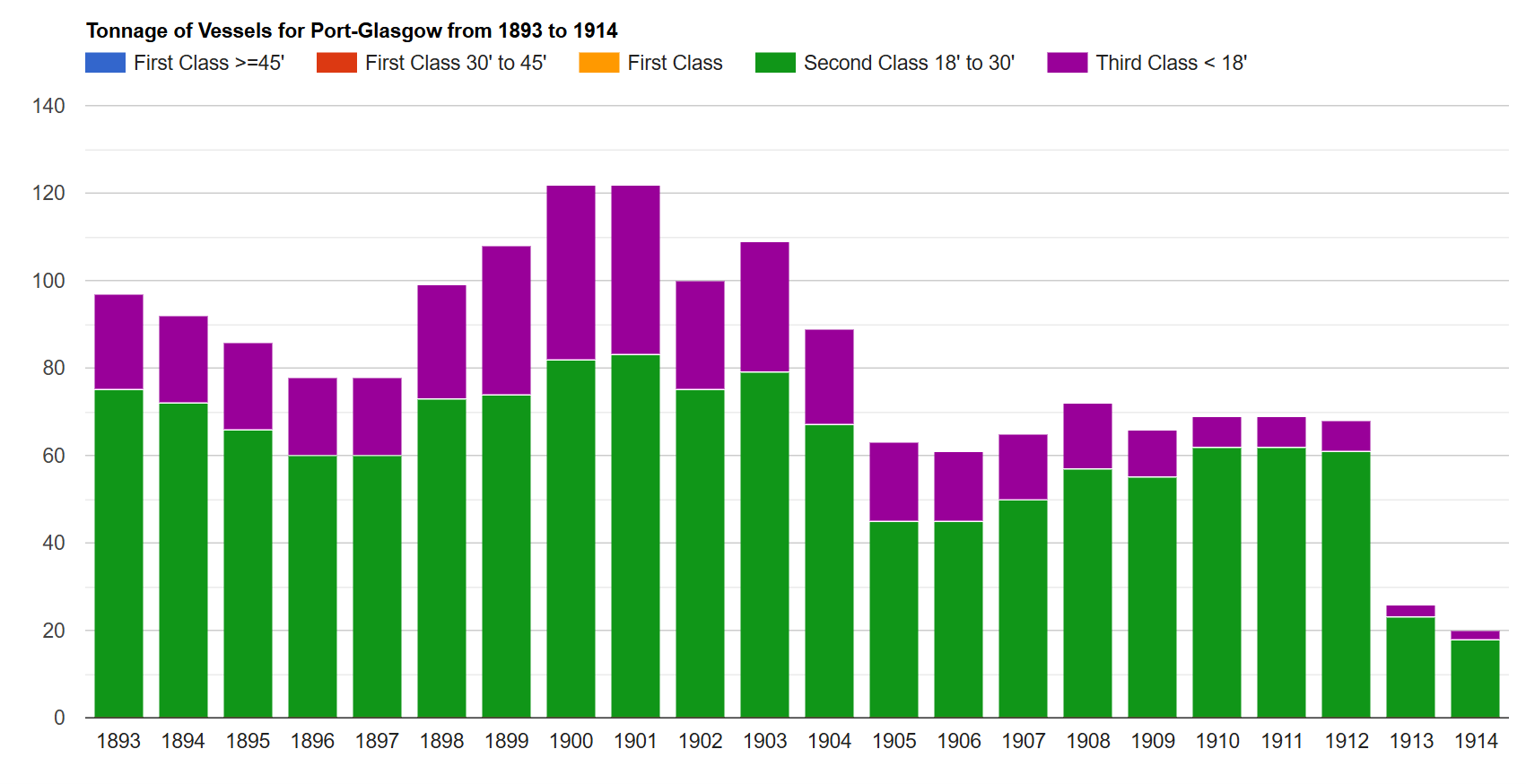
Tonnage of vessels

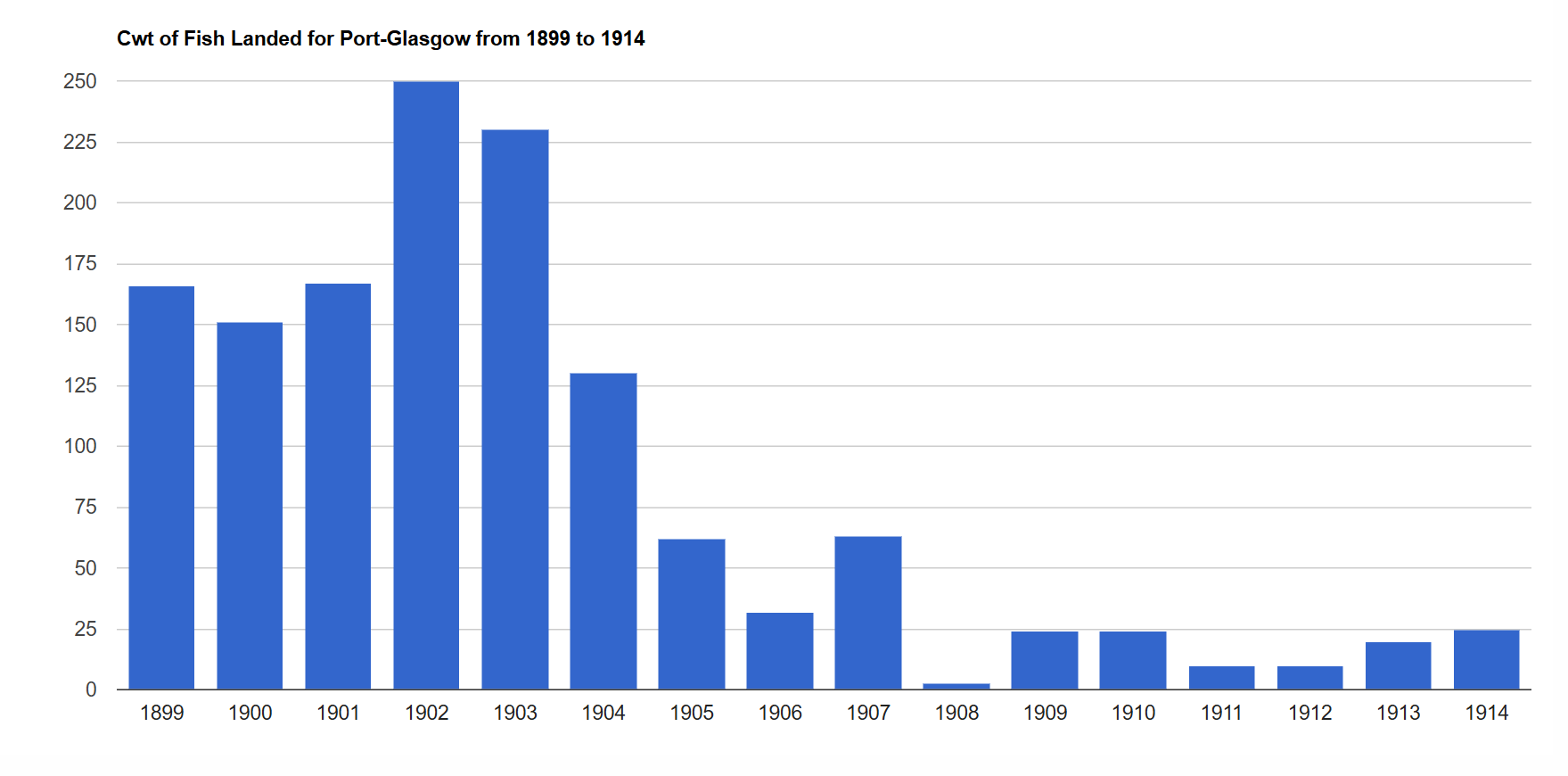
Cwt of fish landed

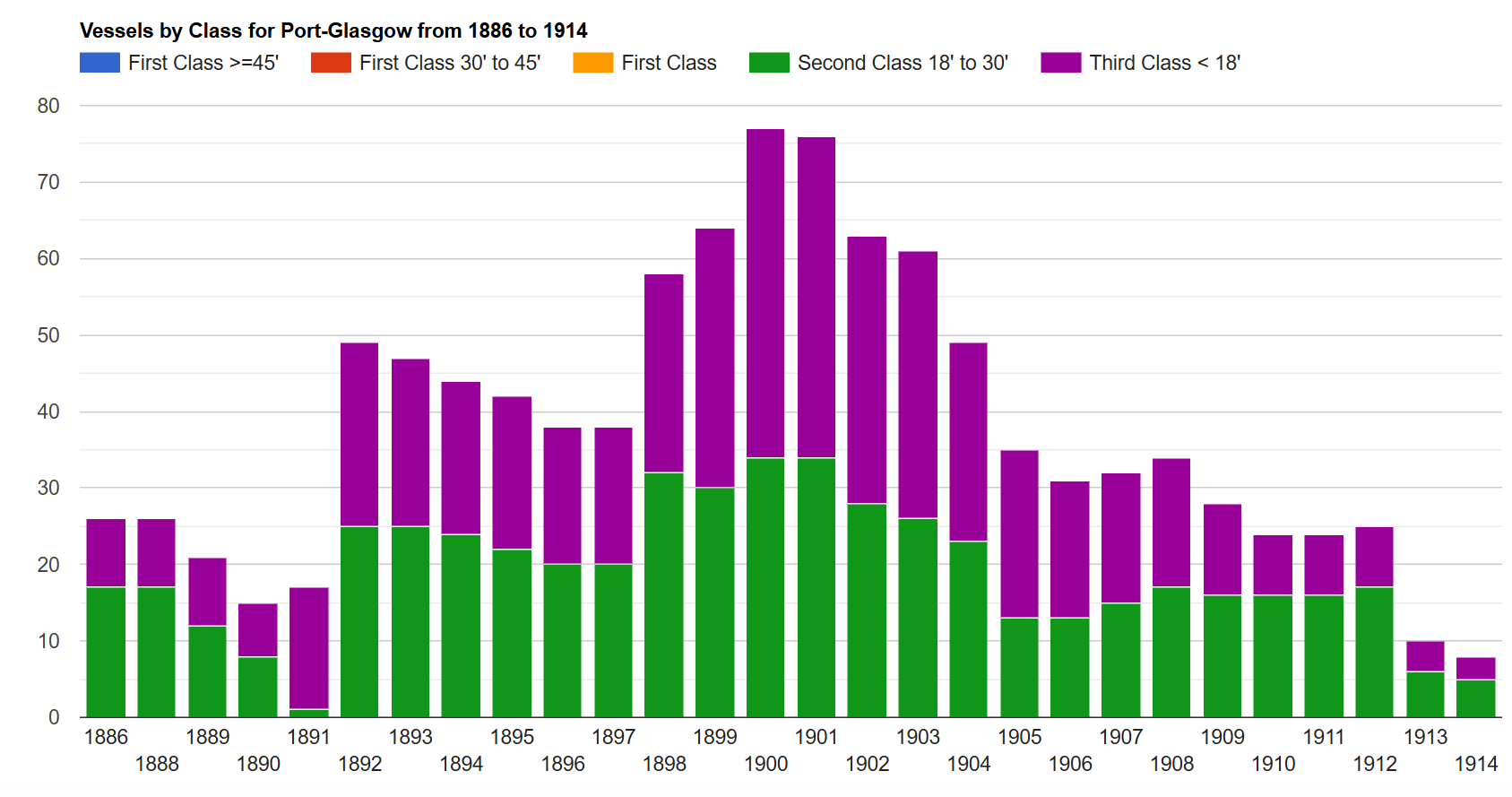
Vessels by class

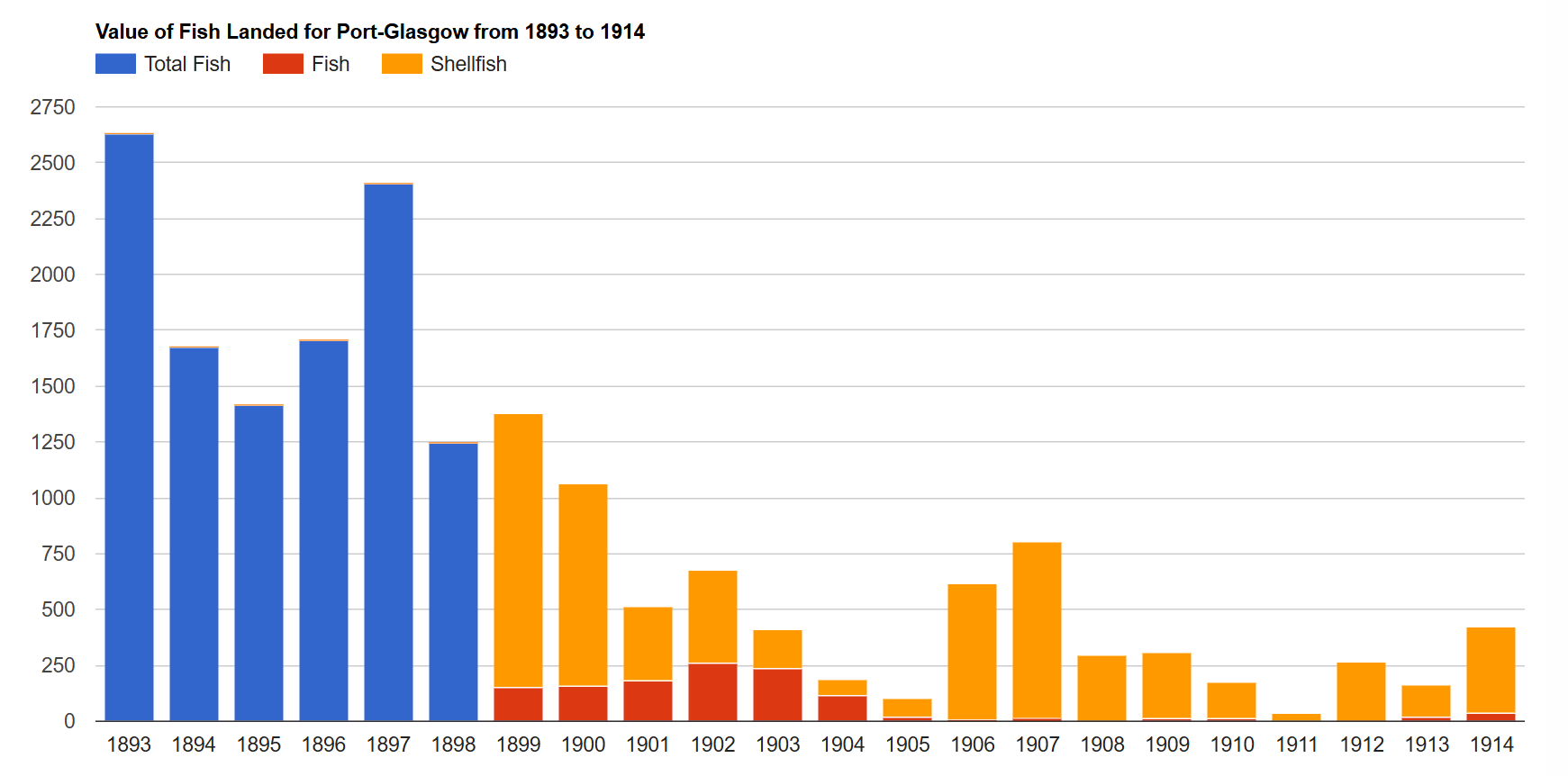
Value (£) of fish landed

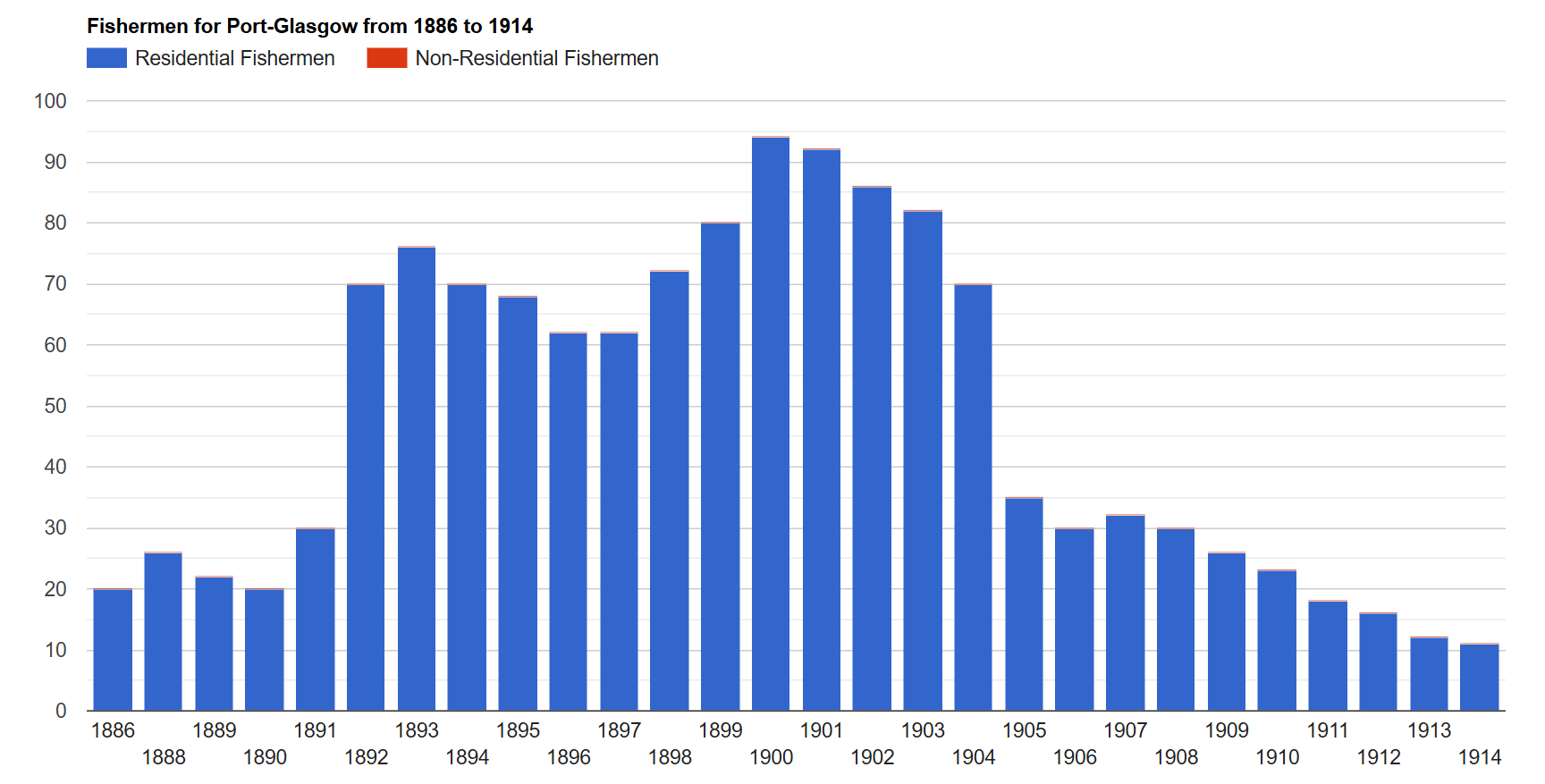
Fishermen

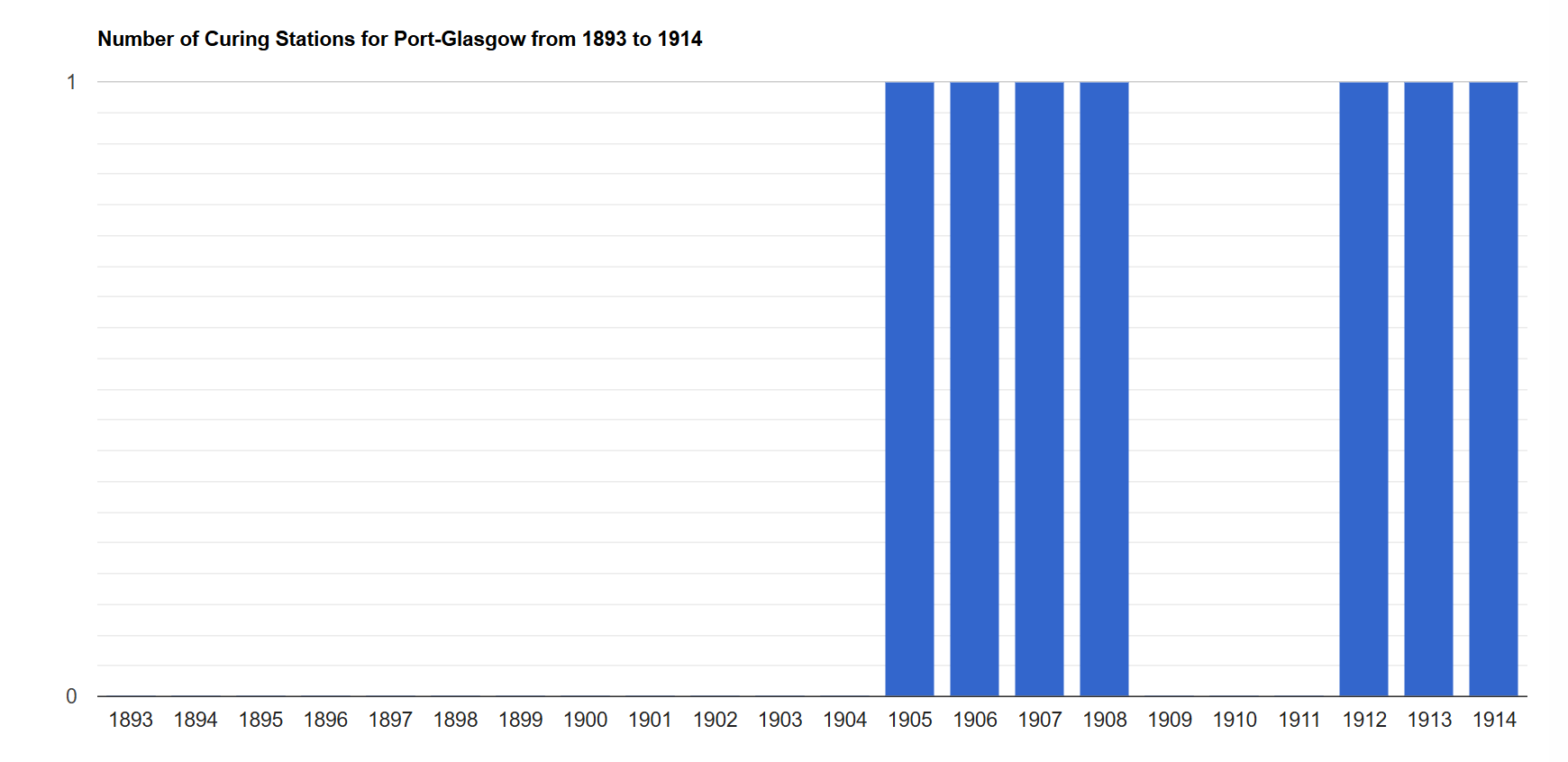
Number of curing stations

=== Regeneration ===
The former Gourock Ropeworks building, built as a sugar refinery in 1866, was redeveloped as luxury flats in 2006, and a retail park has been laid out adjacent to the town centre.

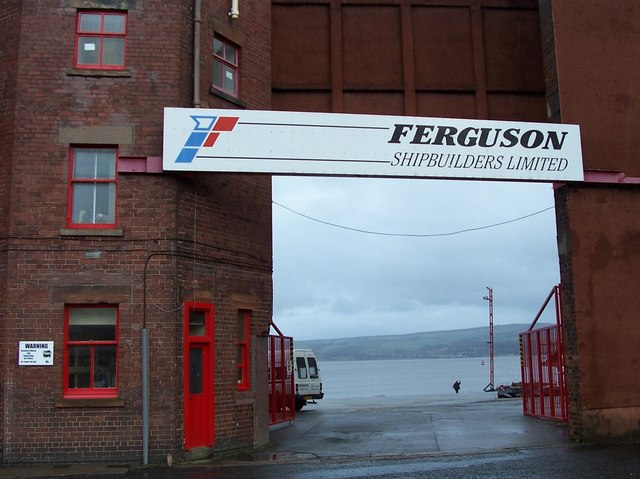
Ferguson's shipyard gate, before demolition in 2015/16

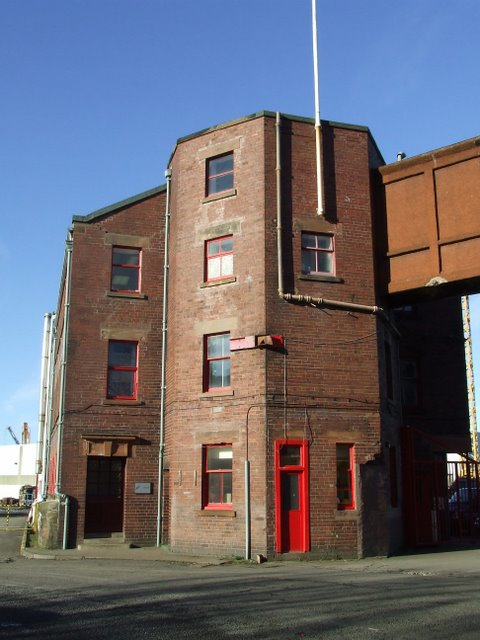
Ferguson's shipyard gatehouse before demolition in 2016

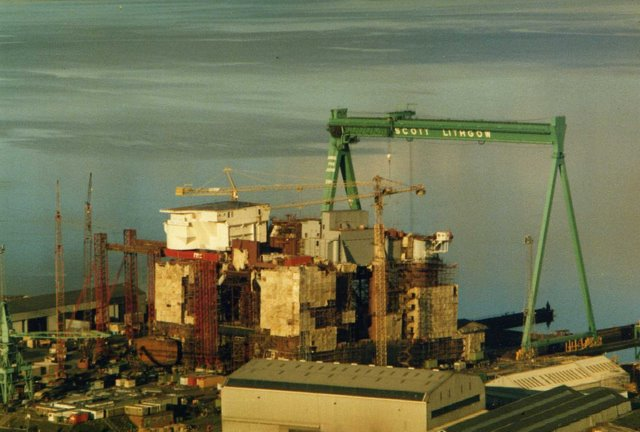
Scott Lithgow's Glen Yard in 1986 (site is now a retail park)

== Transport ==
The town is served by Port Glasgow railway station (main station) in the town centre and Woodhall railway station in the east end of the town. Both stations are on the electrified Inverclyde Line, which has frequent services to the termini at Glasgow Central, Gourock and Wemyss Bay.

From 1869 to 1959, the town was also served by rail at Port Glasgow Upper railway station on the Greenock and Ayrshire Railway.

The town is connected to nearby Glasgow by the A8 dual carriageway and the M8 motorway.

Glasgow Airport located 21 km (13 mi) to the east is the closest airport to Port Glasgow.

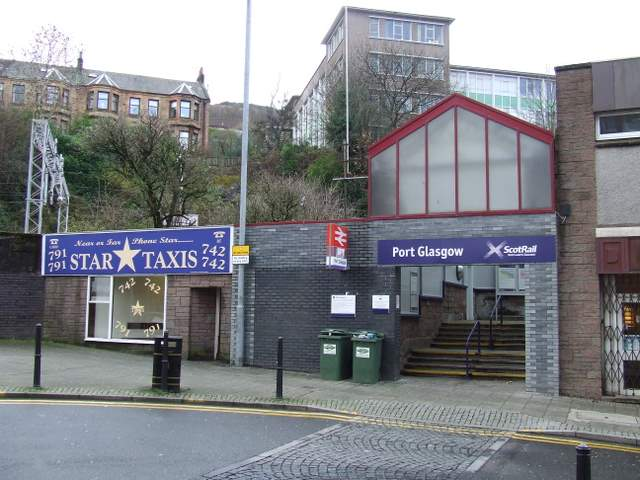
Main entrance to Port Glasgow railway station

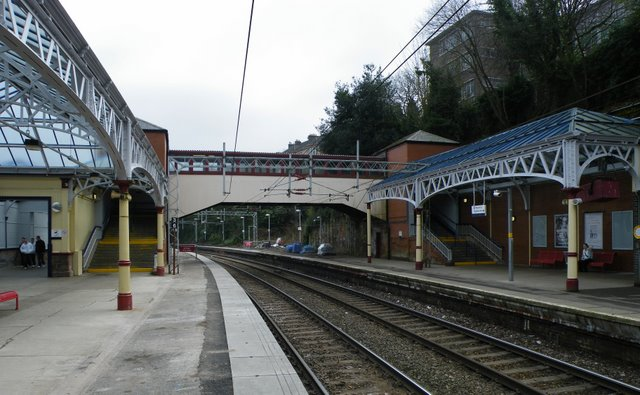
Port Glasgow railway station

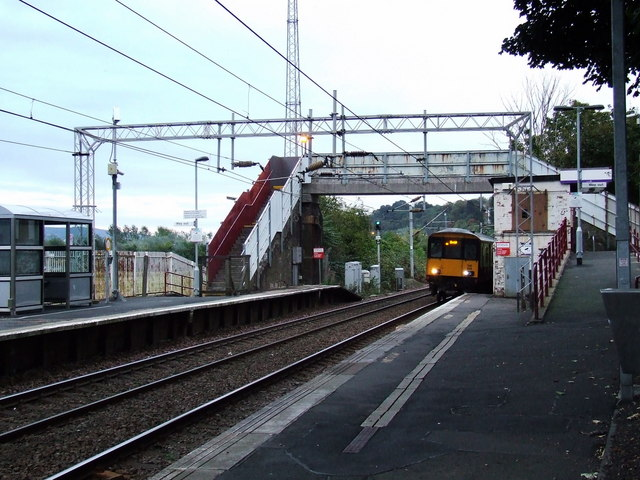
Woodhall railway station

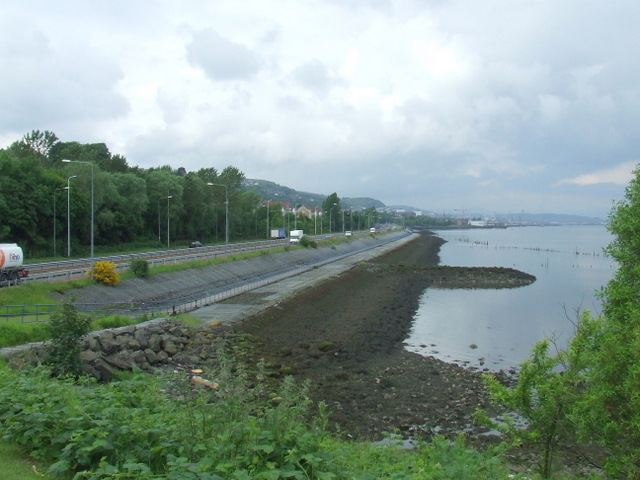
The A8 dual carriageway runs on land reclaimed from the Clyde in the east end of Port Glasgow.

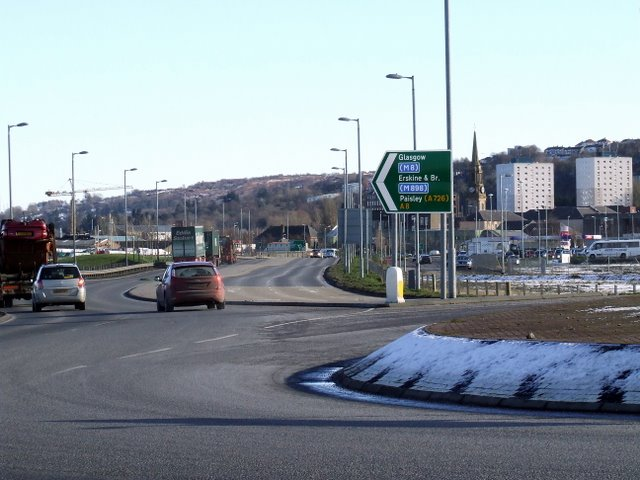
The A8 dual carriageway runs through former shipyard land in the west end of Port Glasgow.

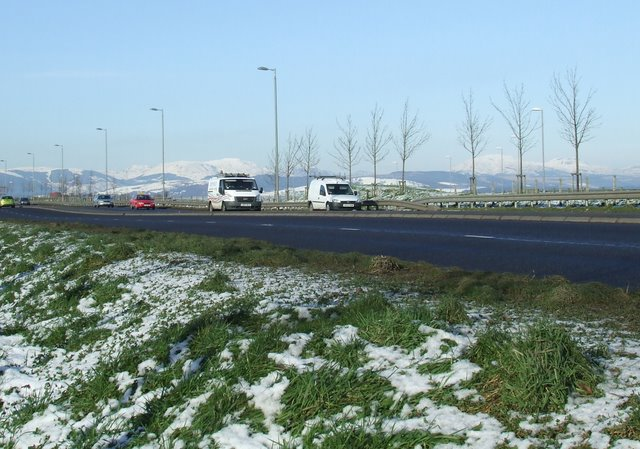
The A8 at Port Glasgow, with the snow-covered Argyll hills beyond

== Visitor attractions ==
=== Newark Castle ===
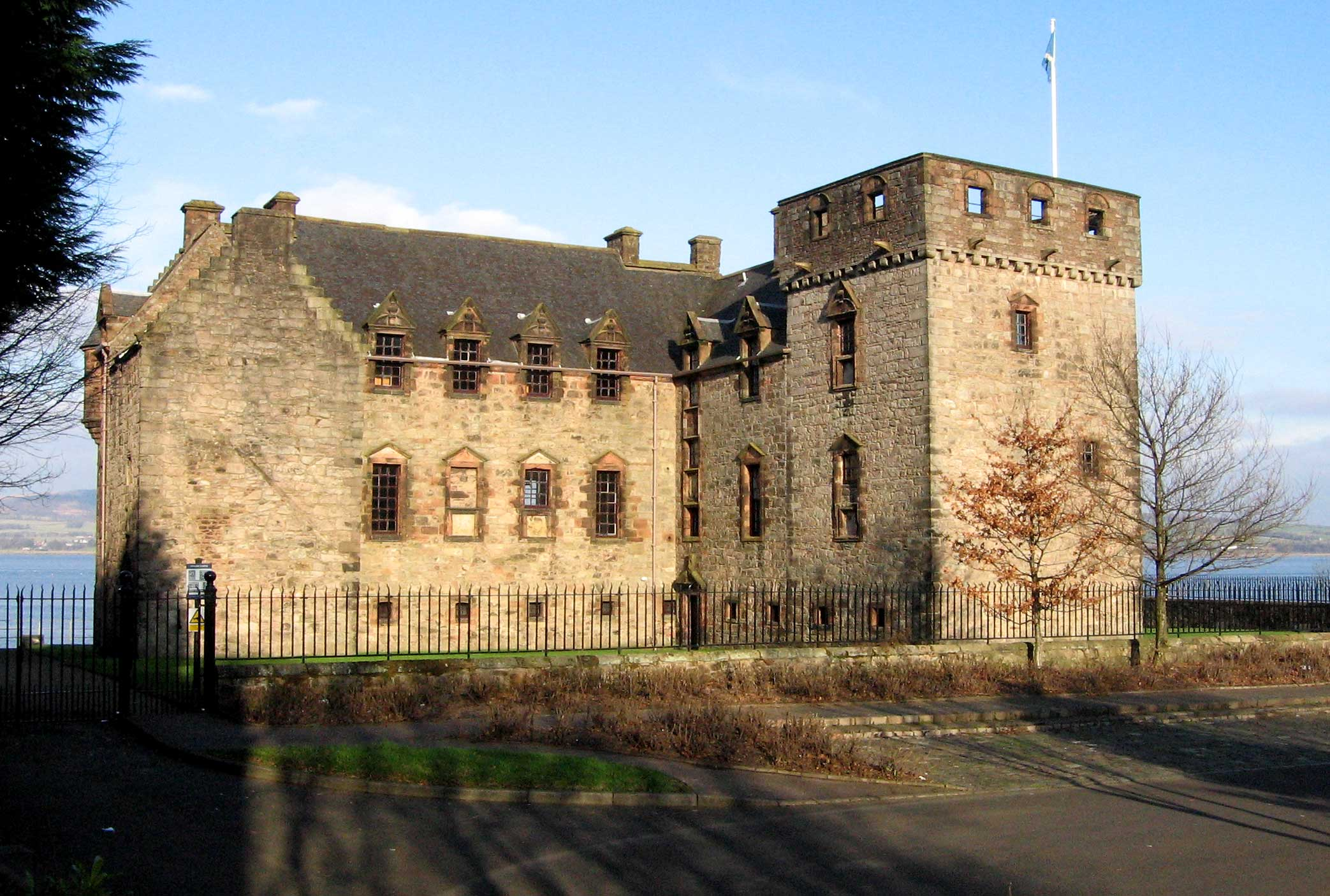
The mansion's main entrance is in its east wing.

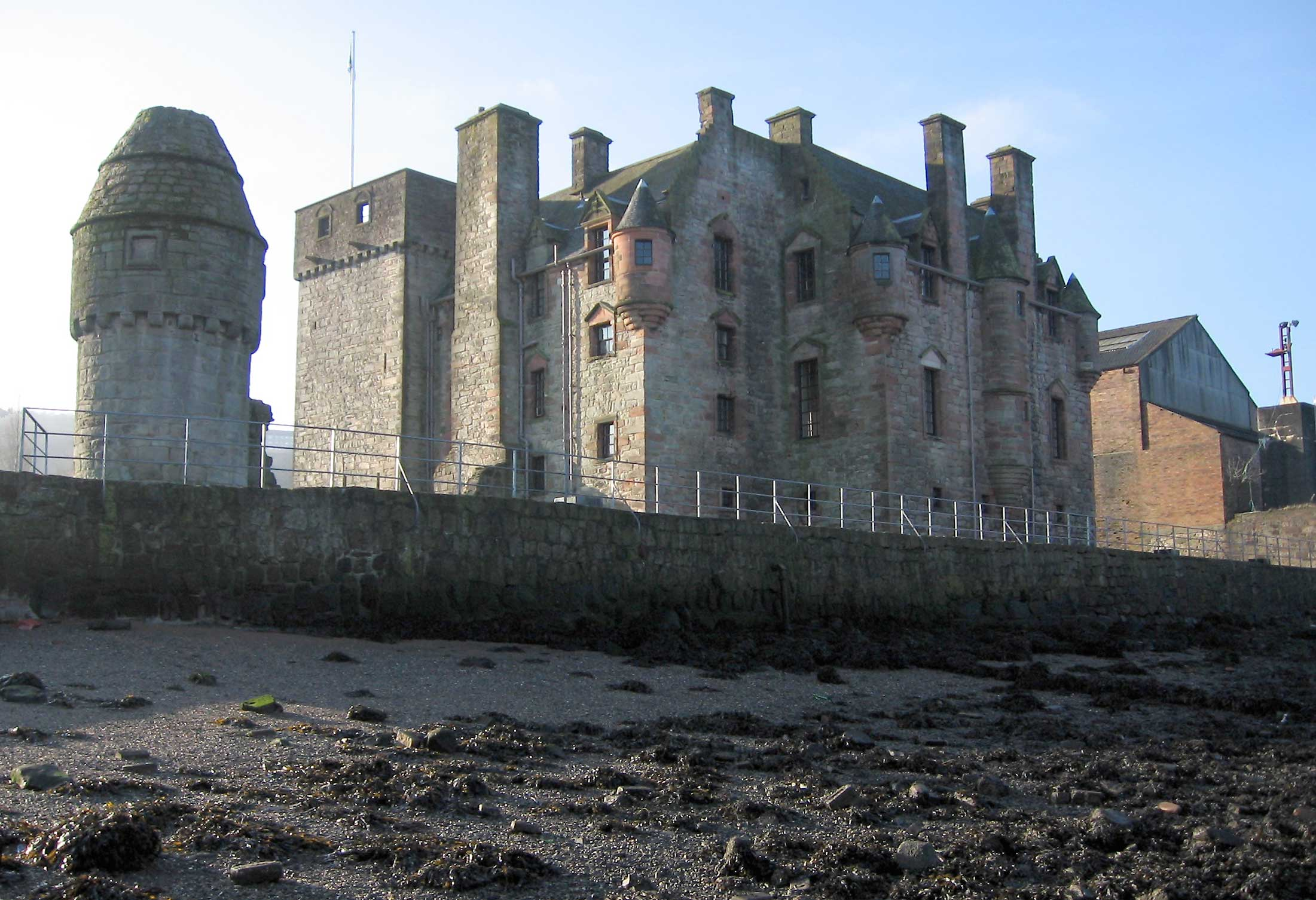
The north range seen from the shore to its north east. See also 1, 2 3.

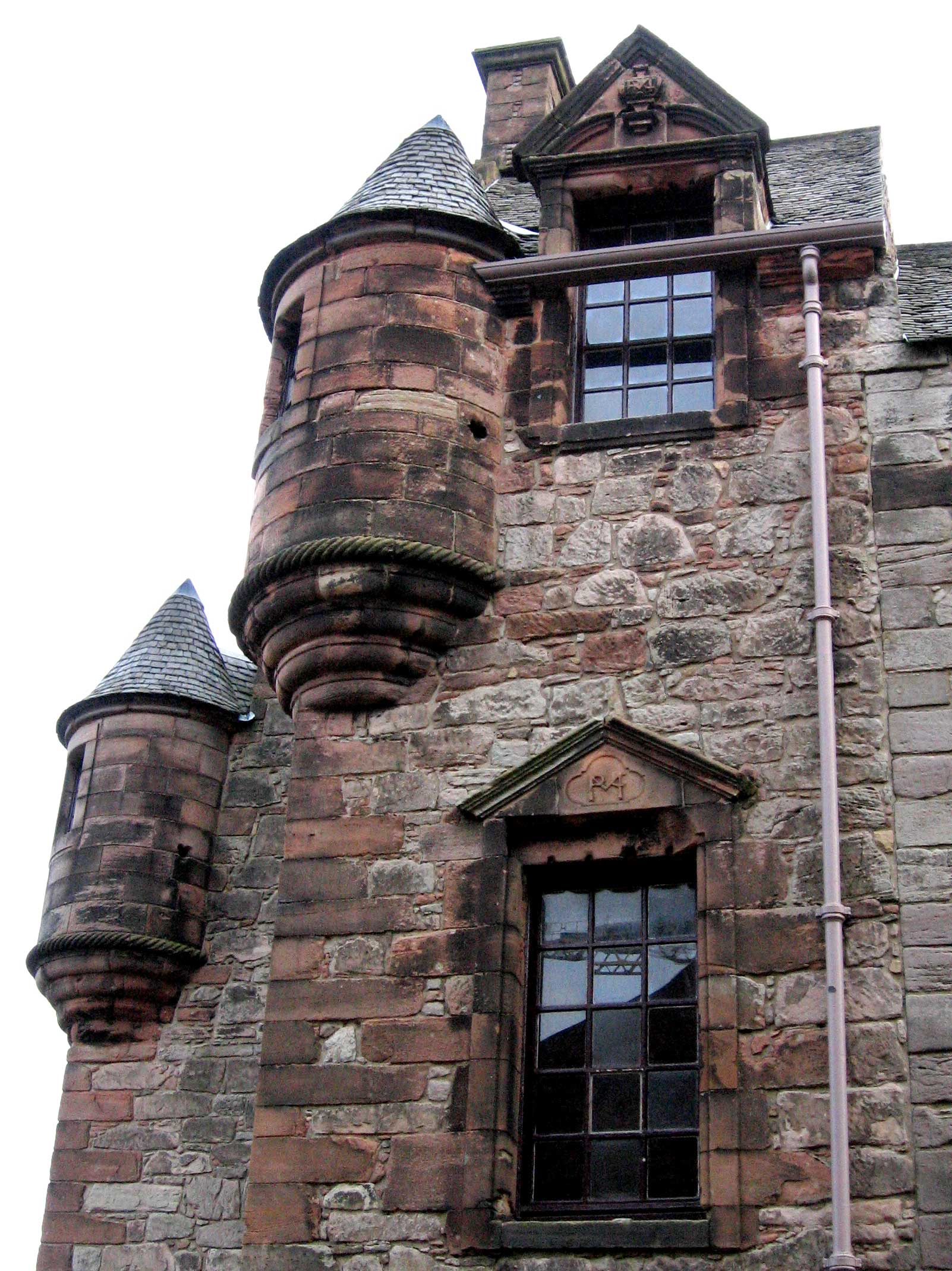
The west wing

Newark Castle stands very close to the shore of the Clyde, and dates to around 1484. It was home to the Maxwell Family until 1694. By 1800, the castle was surrounded by shipyards, but today only Ferguson's shipyard remains, standing immediately to the west of the castle. A park and waterfront walkway have been constructed to the east, on the site of Lamont's shipyard and Smith & Houston's shipbreaking yard. The castle is now a visitor attraction maintained on behalf of the nation by Historic Scotland.

=== Parklea ===
About 1 mile (1.5 kilometres) upstream from the castle and its surrounding park, several acres of the Clyde foreshore at Parklea are owned by the National Trust for Scotland. For many years, the land has been leased to the local council as playing fields. When the NTS acquired the land, it was regarded as protecting the foreshore from the widespread acquisition by shipyards. However, this did not prevent the construction of extensive timber ponds along this stretch of the river.

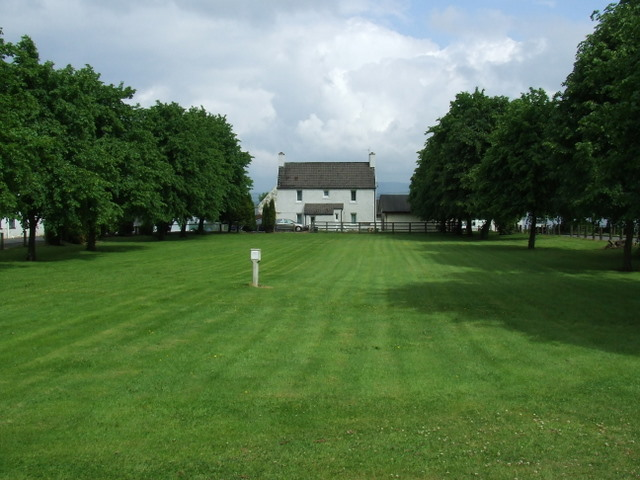
Parklea Farm

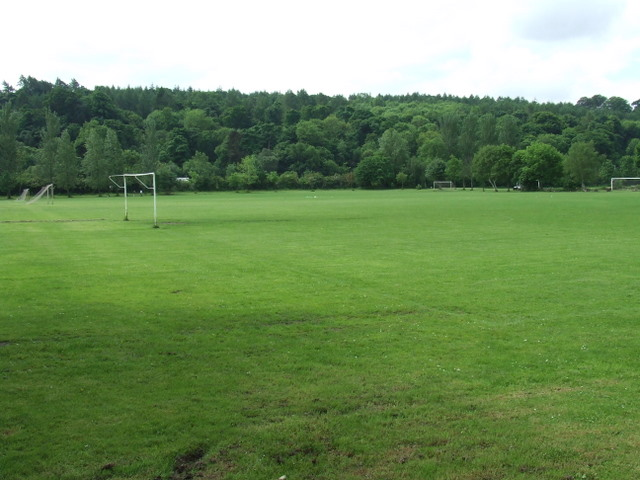
Parklea Playing Fields

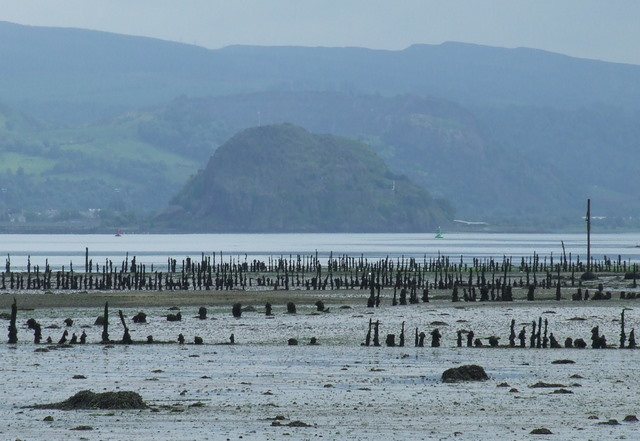
Timber Ponds at Parklea

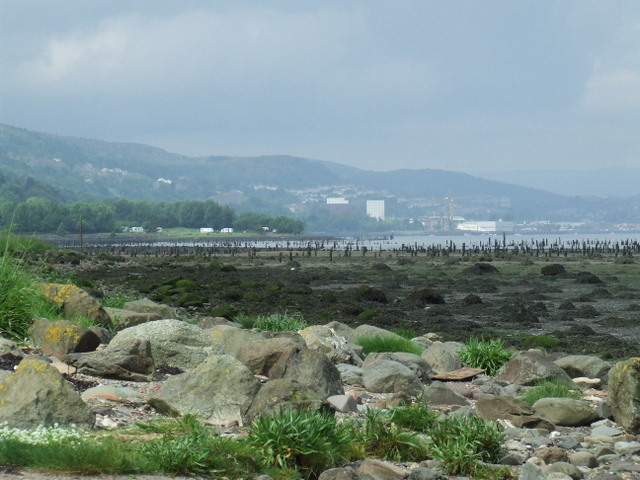
Timber Ponds at Parklea

=== Shipbuilders of Port Glasgow sculpture ===
A new sculpture by John McKenna was installed in Coronation Park in March 2022. The 10m high stainless steel structure depicts two larger than life shipyard workers wielding sledgehammers to bend steel plates into shape to form the hull of a ship, part of which is also depicted. They became known as The Skelpies (the word skelp combined with The Kelpies), and the sculpture was officially launched on 24 June 2023.

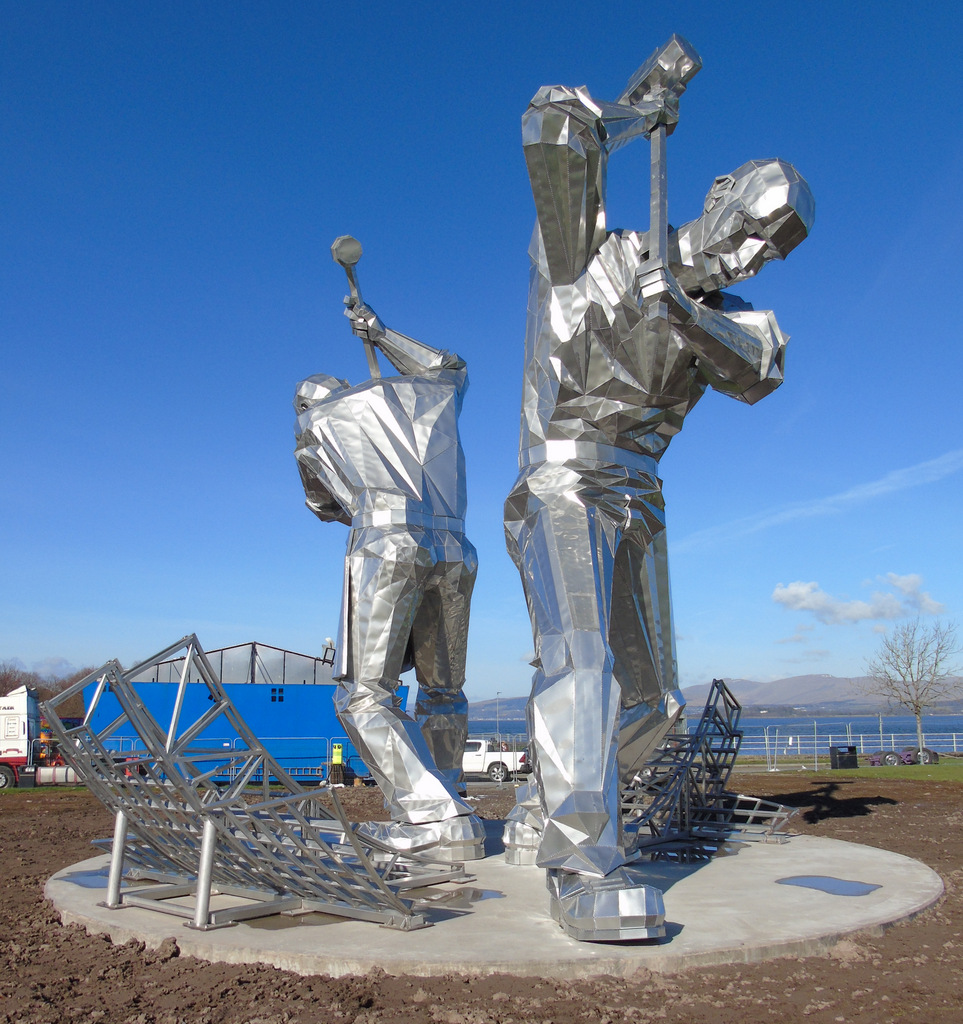
Shipbuilders of Port Glasgow

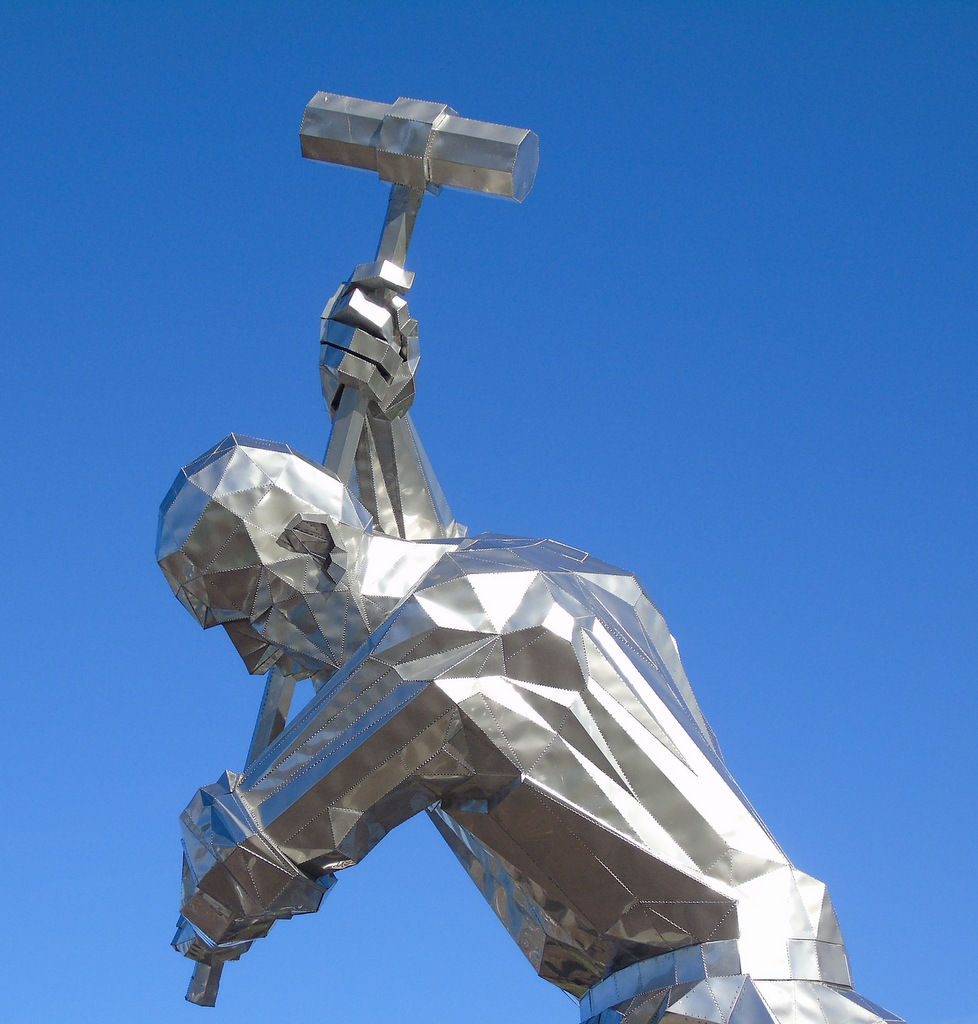
Shipbuilders of Port Glasgow detail

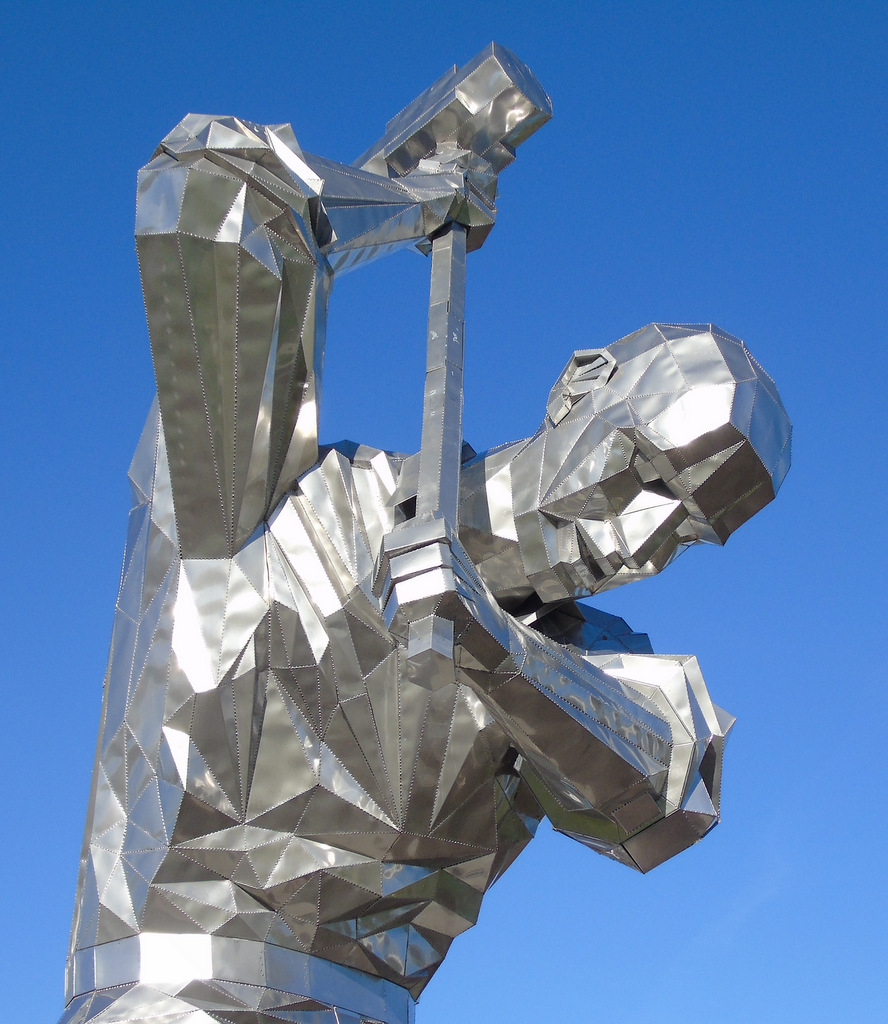
Shipbuilders of Port Glasgow detail

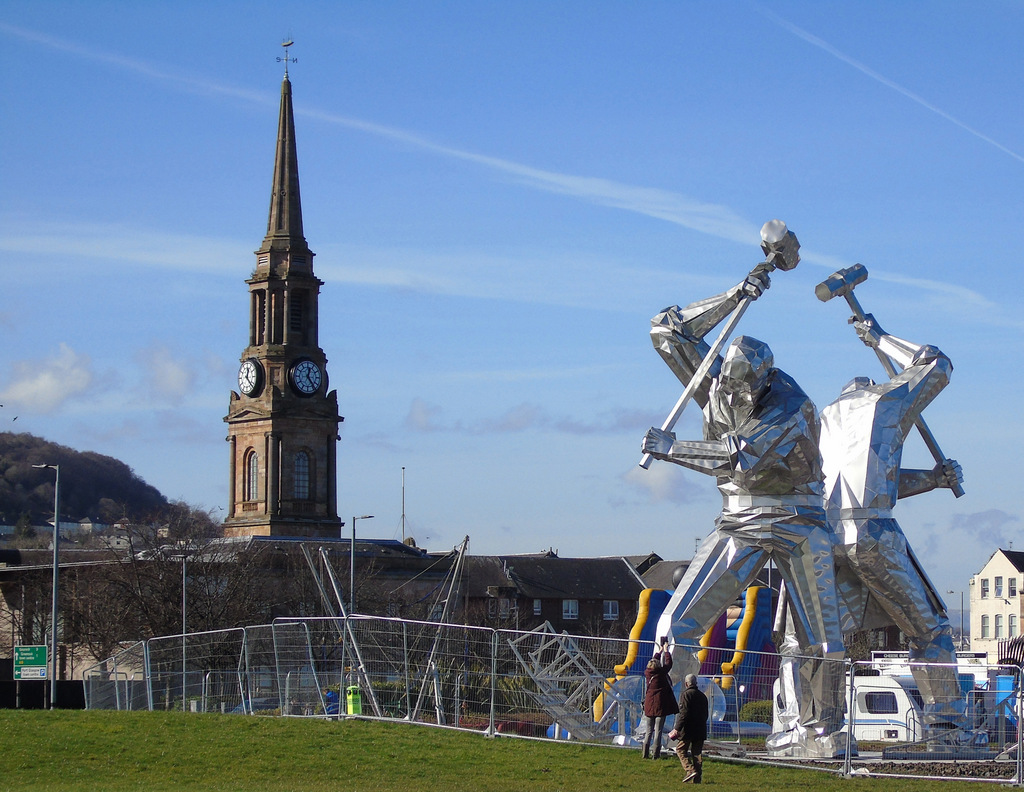
Shipbuilders of Port Glasgow and the Town Buildings

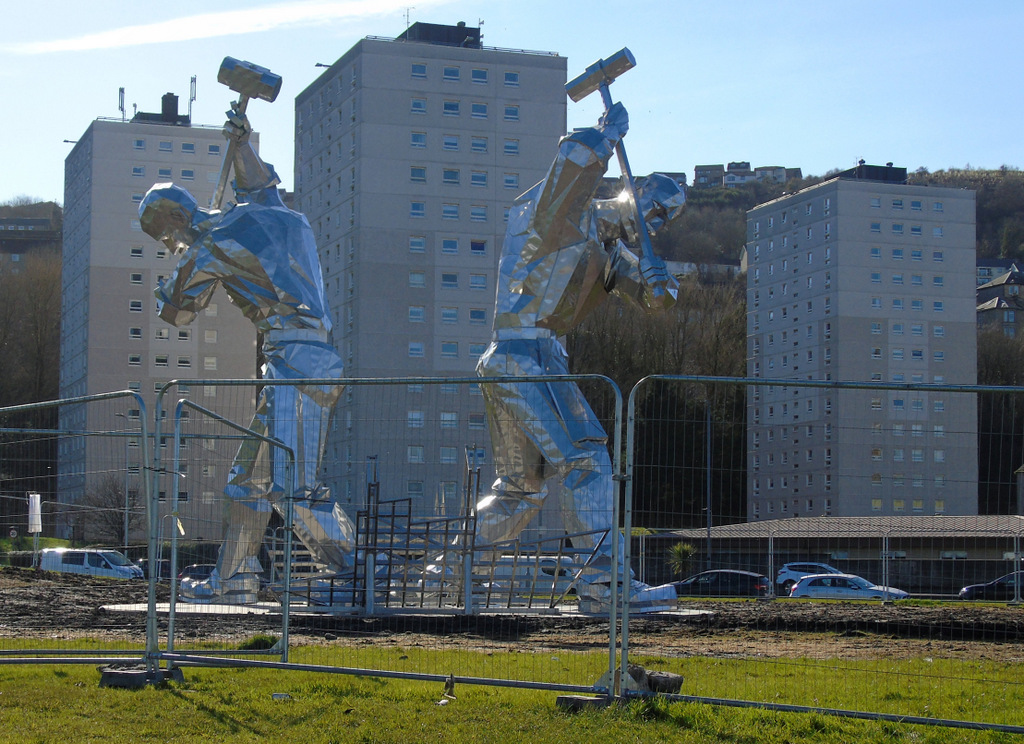
Shipbuilders of Port Glasgow and the Port Glasgow tower blocks

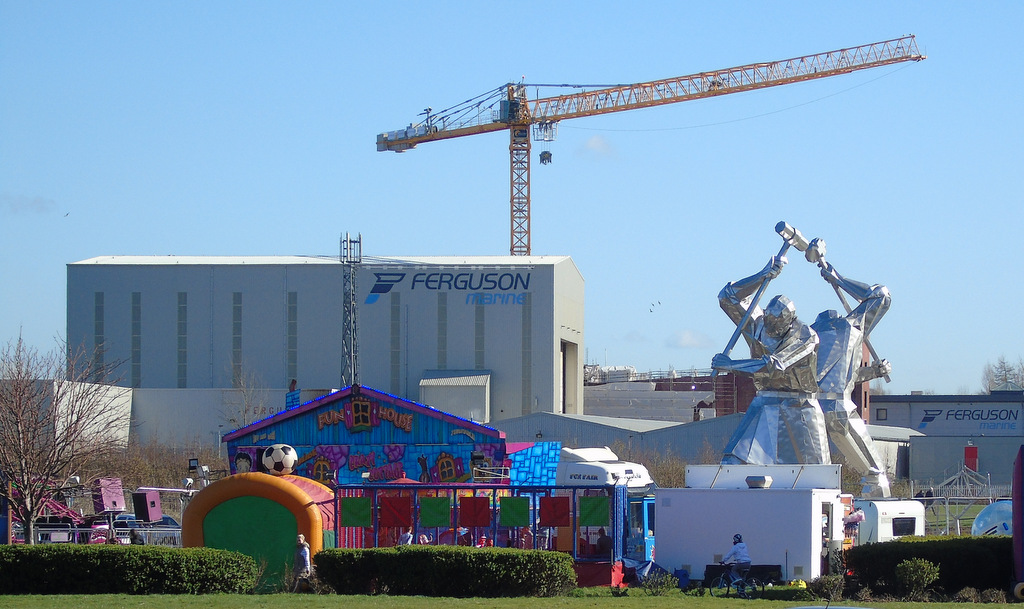
Shipbuilders of Port Glasgow and Ferguson marine shipyard

=== Coronation Park ===
Coronation Park was opened on the site of the West Harbour in 1937 to celebrate the coronation of King George VI. It contains a memorial to the Clyde boating tragedy when 20 people died when a pleasure cruiser capsized in bad weather on 14 September 1947.

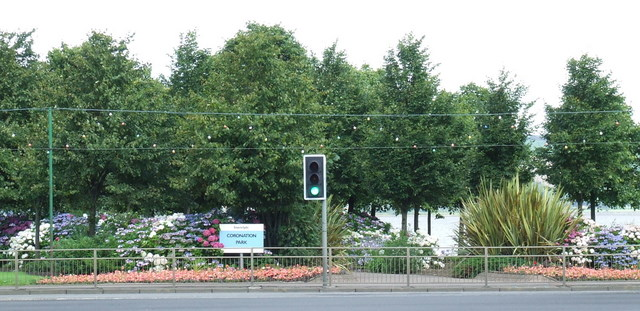
The main pedestrian entrance to the park

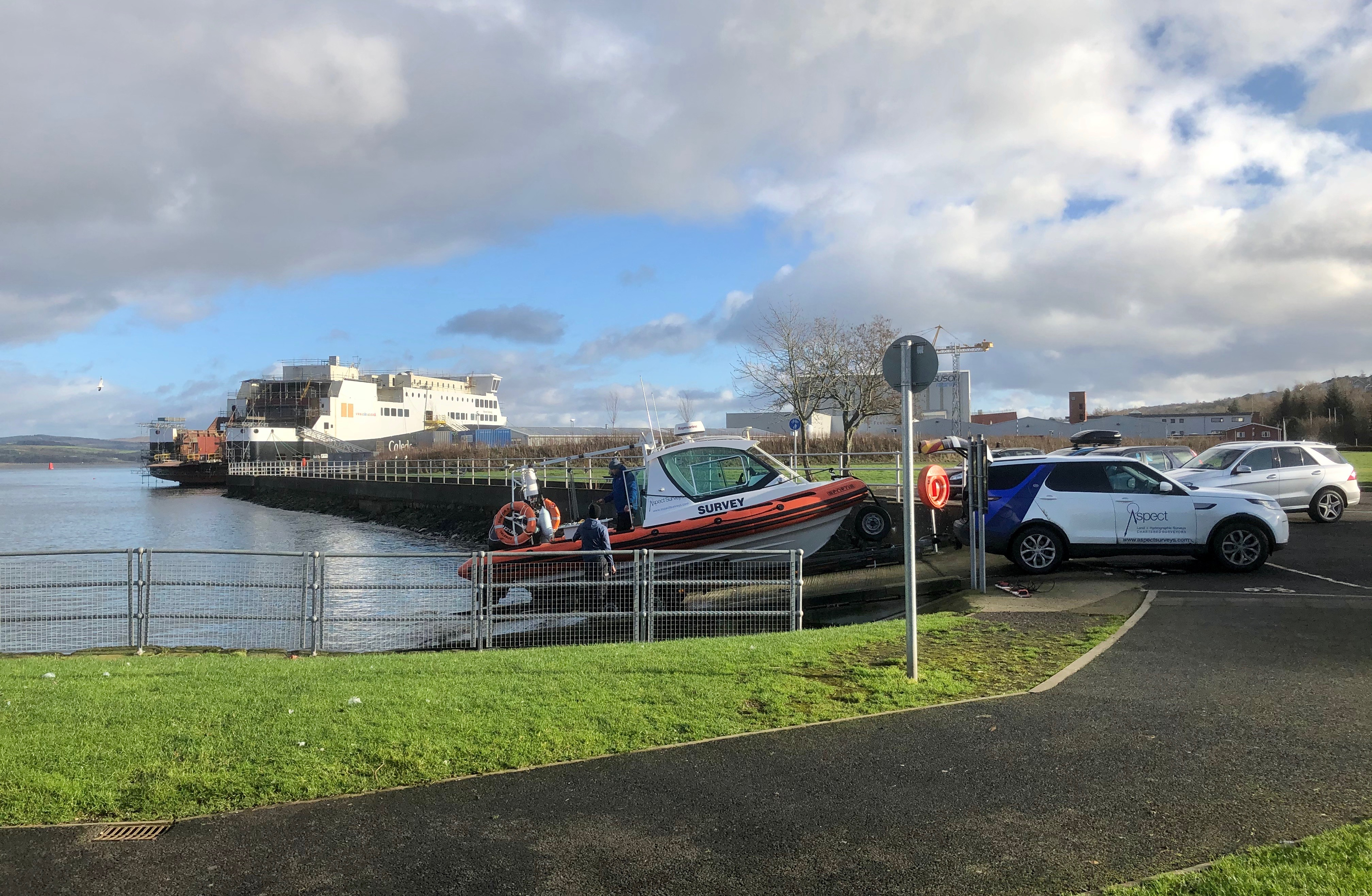
Slipway in use, MV Glen Sannox at Ferguson Marine shipyard

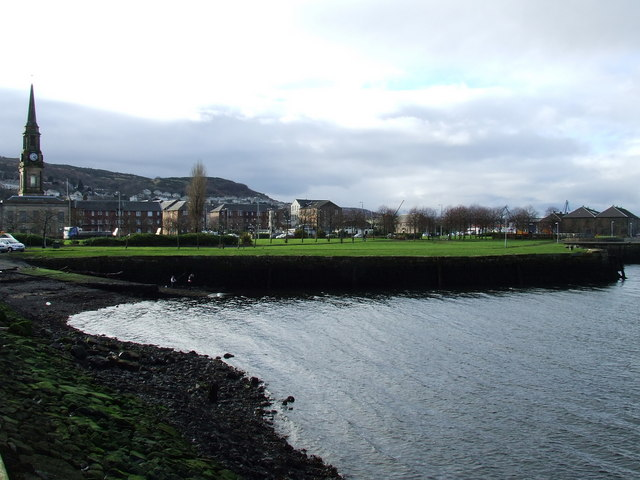
The boat slip at the park

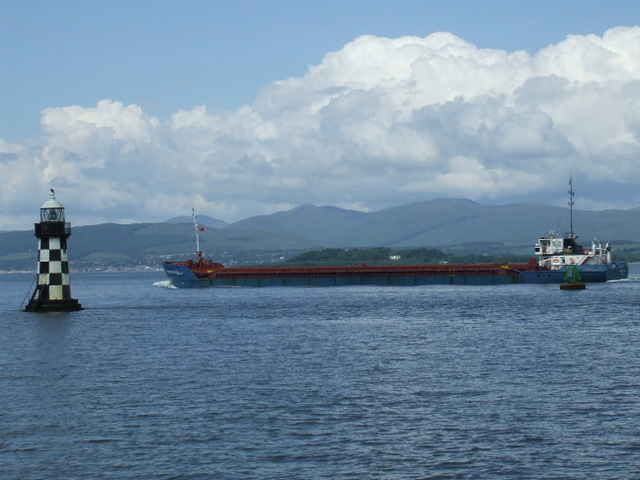
Ships pass very close to the park

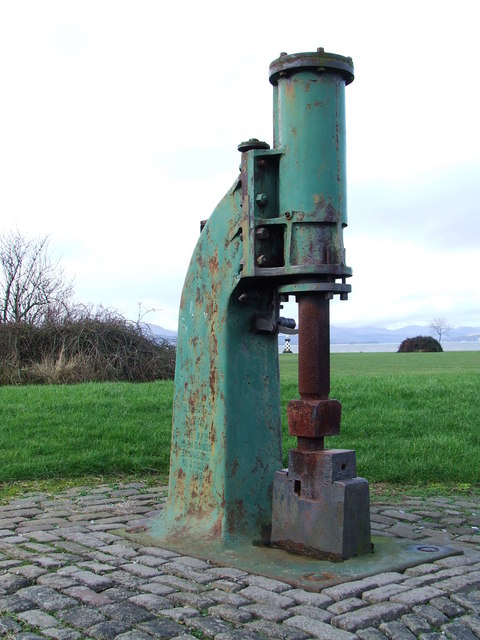
The steam hammer in Coronation Park

== Football ==
Port Glasgow has played host to several successful football clubs, including Port Glasgow Athletic F.C. and their sister side Port Glasgow Athletic Juniors F.C., which are both now defunct. Port Glasgow F.C., formed in 1948, returned "home" to a new stadium at Parklea, Port Glasgow in 2012, following a spell playing their home games in nearby Greenock.

== Parliamentary representation ==
Port Glasgow was a parliamentary burgh as part of the Kilmarnock Burghs constituency from 1832 to 1918, when it was merged into the West Renfrewshire constituency. From 1974 to 1997, it was part of the Greenock and Port Glasgow constituency. It returned to the West Renfrewshire constituency in 1997, before becoming part of the present Inverclyde constituency in 2005. In the Scottish Parliament, Port Glasgow has been part of the West Renfrewshire Holyrood constituency since 1999.

== Areas of Port Glasgow ==
Areas of Port Glasgow include:

- Bardrainney
- Boglestone
- Bouverie
- Broadfield
- Chapelton
- Clune Park Estate
- Devol
- Highholm
- Kelburn
- Kingston Dock
- Lilybank
- Mid Auchinleck
- Park Farm
- Parkhill
- Slaemuir
- Springhill
- Town Centre
- Woodhall

== See also ==
- Harry McNish
- Margaret MacDonald (visionary) (1815–1840)

== Bibliography ==
- Monteith, Joy (2003). Old Port Glasgow. Catrine: Stenlake. ISBN 978-1-84033-250-6.
