= Listed buildings in Ditton Priors =

Ditton Priors is a civil parish in Shropshire, England. It contains 13 listed buildings that are recorded in the National Heritage List for England. Of these, one is at Grade II*, the middle of the three grades, and the others are at Grade II, the lowest grade. The parish contains the village of Ditton Priors and smaller settlements including Middleton Priors, and it otherwise rural. Most of the listed buildings are farmhouses, farm buildings and houses, many of them timber framed and originating from the 16th and 17th centuries. The other listed buildings are a church dating from the 13th century, a public house, and a water point.

== Key ==
| Grade | Criteria |
|---|---|
| II* | Particularly important buildings of more than special interest |
| II | Buildings of national importance and special interest |

== Buildings ==
| Name and location | Photograph | Date | Notes | Grade |
|---|---|---|---|---|
| St John the Baptist's Church; 52.49898°N 2.57851°W | | 13th century | The church dates mainly from the 13th century, the spire was rebuilt in 1831 and was renewed in 1978. The church is in stone and consists of a nave, a large south aisle, a south porch, a chancel, a north vestry, and a west tower. The tower has a shingled broach spire. | II* |
| Hyde Farm House; 52.50805°N 2.55516°W | — | 16th century | The farmhouse is partly timber framed, partly in brick and partly in stone, and has a tile roof. There is one storey and an attic, four bays, and a rear wing. The windows are casements, and there are three gabled dormers. | II |
| Church Farm House; 52.49931°N 2.57824°W | — | 17th century | The farmhouse was later altered and extended. It is partly timber framed and partly in stone with a tile roof. There are two storeys, and an L-shaped plan consisting of a front range with two bays and a rear wing. The windows are casements. | II |
| Derrington East Farm House; 52.51280°N 2.57883°W | — | 17th century (probable) | The farmhouse was later altered. It is in stone with a tile roof, There are two storeys and three bays. The windows are casements. | II |
| Derrington West Farm House; 52.51368°N 2.58091°W | — | 17th century | The farmhouse, which was later altered, is in stone with a tile roof. It has an L-shaped plan, consisting of a main block with two storeys and an attic, and a single-storey wing. Inside the farmhouse are timber framed partitions. | II |
| Former Ditton Farm House; 52.49852°N 2.57842°W | — | 17th century | The farmhouse, later divided into two private houses, is in stone with a tile roof. There are two storeys and attics, each house has two bays, and there is a small rear wing. Each house has a gabled porch, casement windows with segmental heads, and there are three gabled dormers. | II |
| Hall Farm House; 52.49540°N 2.58326°W | — | 17th century | The farmhouse was altered later. It is in stone and has a tile roof. There are two storeys and an attic, and a T-shaped plan, consisting of a three-bay range and a projecting gabled wing to the left. The windows are casements, those in the ground floor with hood moulds. | II |
| Barn, Hyde Farm; 52.50829°N 2.55517°W | | 17th century | The barn is timber framed with brick infill on a stone plinth, and has a tile roof. There are two storeys and it contains various openings. | II |
| Ruthall Manor; 52.50556°N 2.59262°W | — | 17th century | The house was altered later, including refronting in about 1820. It is in stone and brick and has a tiled roof. There are two storeys and a front of three bays. The windows are a mix of casements and sashes. | II |
| Howard Arms Hotel; 52.49881°N 2.57748°W | | 18th century | The public house is in stone with a tile roof, and has an L-shaped plan. The main range has two storeys and five bays, and to the right is a higher gabled wing with two storeys and an attic. On the front is a gabled porch, and the windows are casements, most with segmental heads. | II |
| Middleton Lodge; 52.50887°N 2.55684°W | | 18th century | The building is in stone with a slate roof, partly plastered. It has an L-shaped plan, with one range of three storeys, five bays on the front and three on the side, and another range at right angles with two storeys and four bays. Some windows are sashes with keystones, and others are casements with segmental heads, and above the main doorway is a fanlight. Inside is a fragment of a 17th-century timber framed house, and in the top floor is a Roman Catholic chapel with a dome over the altar. | II |
| The Old Vicarage; 52.49862°N 2.58598°W | — | 1828 | The vicarage, later a private house, is in red brick with a hipped slate roof. There are two storeys with an attic and a front of three bays. The windows are sashes. | II |
| Stone Water Point; 52.49778°N 2.57783°W | — | 1840s | This consists of a tap to supply water set on the rear wall of a stone structure within a Gothic arch with voussoirs, a chamfered surround, and an inner chamfered arch. It contains a datestone and a coat of arms. | II |
