= Ditton Priors =

Village in Shropshire, England

Coordinates: 52.499°N 2.578°W

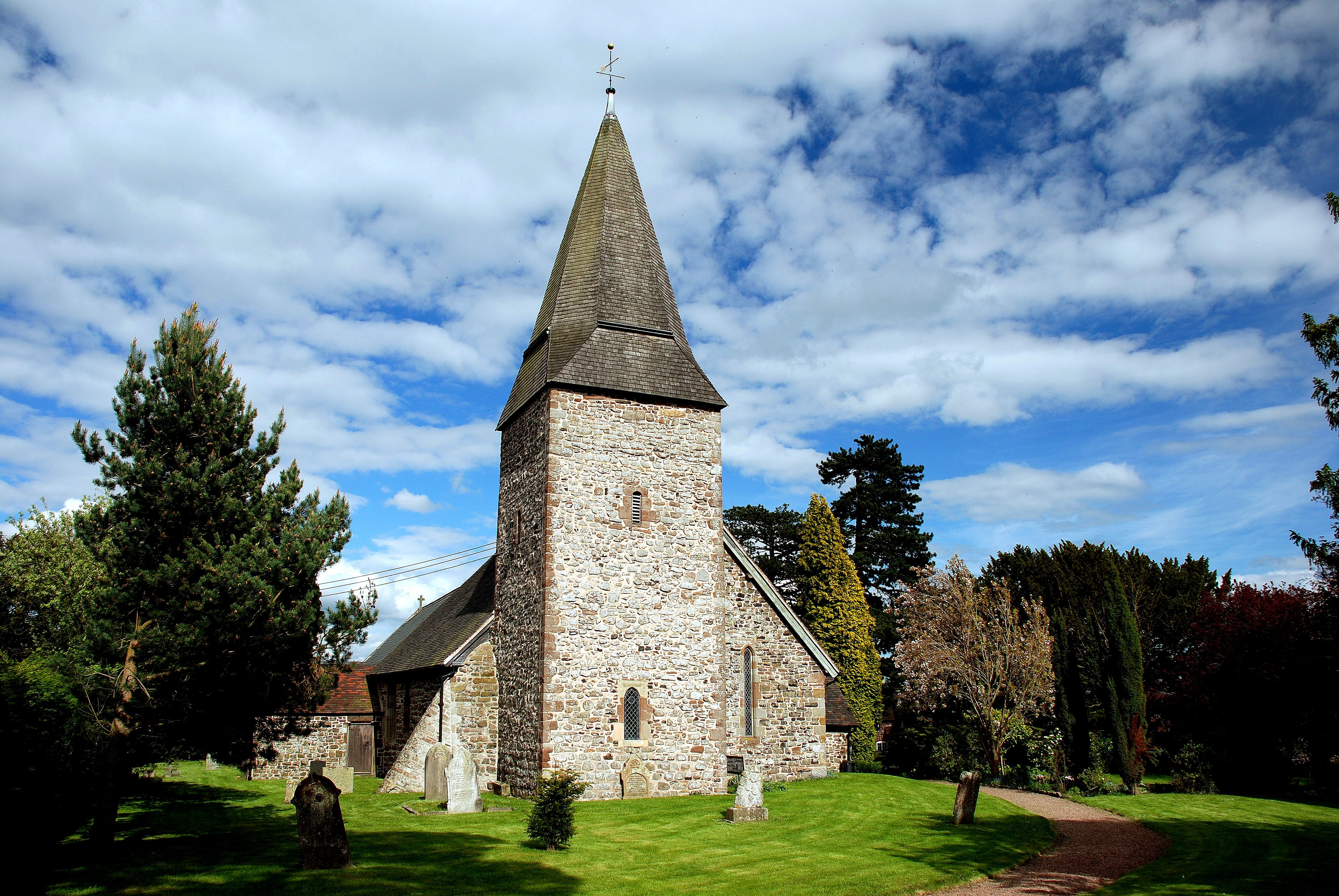
- St. John the Baptist Church

- Location within Shropshire
- Population: 821 (2011)
- OS grid reference: SO607892
- Civil parish: Ditton Priors
- Unitary authority: Shropshire
- Ceremonial county: Shropshire
- Region: West Midlands
- Country: England
- Sovereign state: United Kingdom
- Post town: BRIDGNORTH
- Postcode district: WV16
- Dialling code: 01746
- Police: West Mercia
- Fire: Shropshire
- Ambulance: West Midlands
- UK Parliament: Ludlow

Ditton Priors is a village and civil parish in the postal district of Bridgnorth, Shropshire, England. Historically, it was also known as Priors Ditton.

The nearest town is Bridgnorth. The village is situated near Shropshire's highest hill, Brown Clee Hill.

== The Church of St. John the Baptist ==
St. John the Baptist is the church located in Ditton Priors and was dedicated to Saint Mary The Virgin in the 15th century. Parts of the church are thought to date back to the 12th century. The church is located in the centre of the village, on higher ground than its surroundings. The majority of the church is built in Dhustone, from the nearby Clee Hill. The interior of the church houses stained glass and an open timber roof. The churchyard contains a war grave of a King's Shropshire Light Infantry soldier of World War I and the clock on the south wall of the tower was given as a memorial to parish men who died in the same war.

== The Howard Arms ==
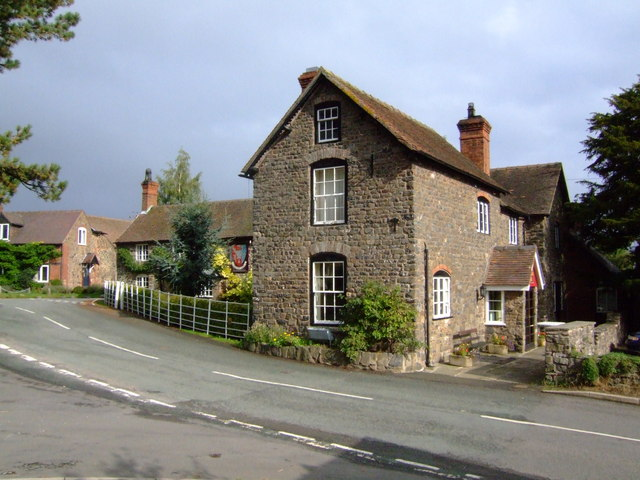
The Howard Arms, Ditton Priors' village pub.

The building that is now The Howard Arms dates back to the 18th century, where it was used as a vicarage and a public house. It is one of the larger 18th century establishments in the village. It now serves as a local pub.

== Cleobury Mortimer and Ditton Priors Light Railway ==
The Cleobury Mortimer and Ditton Priors Light Railway once ran to the village and during (and for a period after) the Second World War there was a major military armaments depot near the village because of the village's remote, rural location and the railway link.

The light railway was built 1907–1908, with its purpose being to carry stone from Abdon Burf quarry. It was under the operation of the Great Western Railway, and ran from Ditton Priors to Cleobury Mortimer. From there, it joined the line from Bewdley to Tenbury Wells. A passenger service operated for thirty years between 1908 and 1938. The line served the Royal Naval Armaments Depot, which was located near the village and was in operation between 1939 and 1965.

== Archaeological finds ==
There have been archaeological finds in close proximity to Ditton Priors. A basalt axe hammer and flints have been located at Lightwood and Oakwood. Abdon Burf hill fort lies within the parish. It was one of the most impressive Iron Age forts in Shropshire until it was largely destroyed by mining and quarrying.

== Census data ==
The Census is a country wide survey that allows the government to see and control where funding is needed most. The data is available for public use and distribution and is carried out every 10 years.

In 1831, the structure of social class was very different. A high percentage of the population were labourers/servants, and middling sorts, while a very low percentage of the population were employers or professionals.

By looking at historical occupation data, males dominate the majority of the occupation types in comparison to females, which is not uncommon for the period of time that the census data was taken. A large percentage of females, however, worked in domestic offices and services, but a very small proportion worked in agriculture or as a professional.

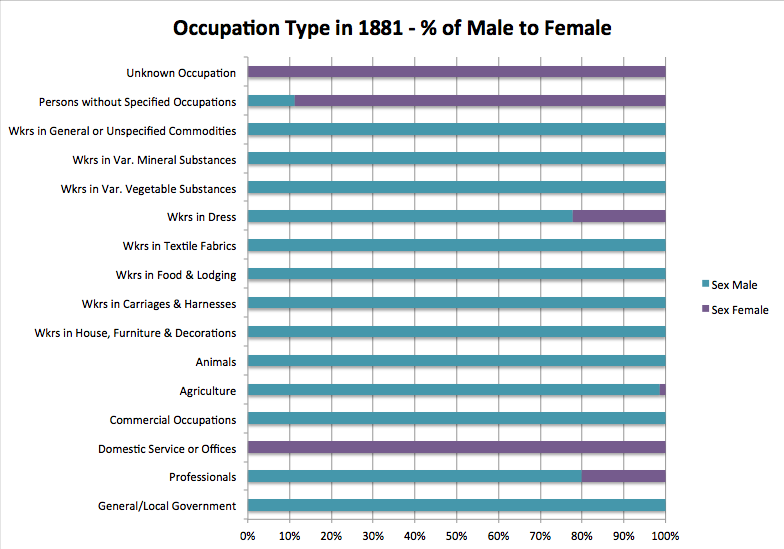
1881 Historical Occupation Graph

Historical population
Year	Pop.	±%
1801	620	—
1811	649	+4.7%
1821	685	+5.5%
1831	584	−14.7%
1841	660	+13.0%
1851	583	−11.7%
1861	598	+2.6%
1871	581	−2.8%
1881	501	−13.8%
1891	619	+23.6%
1901	650	+5.0%
1911	613	−5.7%
1921	701	+14.4%
1931	617	−12.0%

== Neighbourhood statistics ==
When looking at neighbourhood statistics, the settlement of Ditton Priors falls into the neighbourhood of Bridgnorth (007A). When looking at a summary of deprivation in the area, Ditton Priors and its surrounding area suffers from an above average level of deprivation. The neighbourhood contains approximately 1588 residents with 687 dwellings. Because Ditton Priors is a rural settlement, it faces an element of socio-economic deprivation because of its location and proximity to services, such as health care and educational establishments.

== Educational Establishments ==
=== Brown Clee CE Primary School ===
Set in the countryside of Shropshire, the primary school in Ditton Priors serves the village itself, along with the surrounding settlements. The school was built in 1994 and provides students with a "good" standard of teaching, as surveyed by Ofsted in 2014.

=== Secondary schools ===
There are no secondary schools in Ditton Priors. The nearest secondary schools are located in Bridgnorth.

=== Further education ===
The nearest college for students aged 16 or higher is in Ludlow.

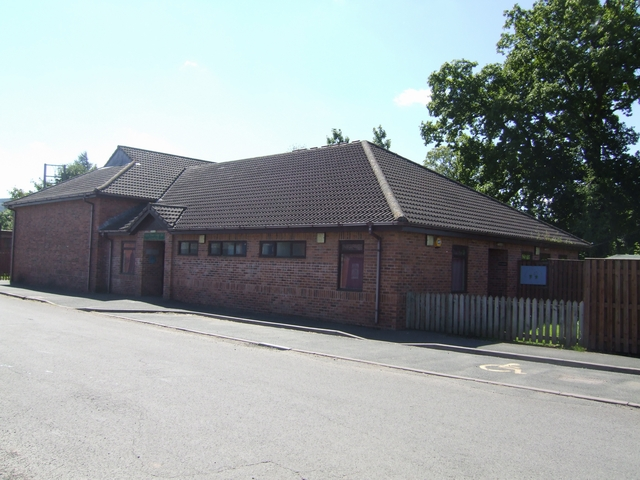
Ditton Priors Village Hall

== Transport ==
The village lies approximately 147 miles from London.

The nearest rail station is approximately 9.9 miles away.

The nearest airport is Birmingham Airport, which is approximately 35.8 miles away.

== Climate ==
Ditton Priors, located within the region of The Midlands, is at the geographical heart of England, giving it a mixture of climatical characteristics. It acts as a transitional area between the northern and southern parts of England when regarding temperature, and between Wales and the East of England when regarding rainfall.

As with much of the United Kingdom, the coldest month is January, while the warmest month is July. Altitude affects average temperature results, with the Severn Valley to the south and the Peak District to the north of The Midlands contributing to the average climate figures for the region.

Climate data for The Midlands
Month	Jan	Feb	Mar	Apr	May	Jun	Jul	Aug	Sep	Oct	Nov	Dec	Year
Mean daily maximum °C (°F)	6.3 (43.3)	6.7 (44.1)	9.3 (48.7)	11.7 (53.1)	15.5 (59.9)	18.2 (64.8)	20.9 (69.6)	20.5 (68.9)	17.4 (63.3)	13.3 (55.9)	9.3 (48.7)	7.2 (45.0)	13.1 (55.6)
Mean daily minimum °C (°F)	0.8 (33.4)	0.7 (33.3)	2.2 (36.0)	3.4 (38.1)	6.1 (43.0)	9.0 (48.2)	11.2 (52.2)	11.0 (51.8)	9.0 (48.2)	6.2 (43.2)	3.2 (37.8)	1.7 (35.1)	5.4 (41.7)
Average precipitation mm (inches)	76.0 (2.99)	55.5 (2.19)	62.0 (2.44)	57.1 (2.25)	55.7 (2.19)	63.0 (2.48)	51.8 (2.04)	65.2 (2.57)	69.2 (2.72)	74.1 (2.92)	73.2 (2.88)	82.7 (3.26)	785.5 (30.93)
Source: Met Office

== Notable people ==
Fred Jordan (1922–2002), folk singer, died in a residential home at Ditton Priors.

== See also ==
- Listed buildings in Ditton Priors
