= Mid Auchinleck =

Coordinates: 55.92118°N 4.66608°W

Mid Auchinleck: Scottish Gaelic: Achadh nan Leac
- Location within Inverclyde
- OS grid reference: NS335730
- Council area: Inverclyde
- Lieutenancy area: Renfrewshire
- Country: Scotland
- Sovereign state: United Kingdom

Mid Auchinleck is an area in the town of Port Glasgow, Inverclyde, Scotland. Mid Auchinleck was the name of a now disappeared farm located on this site. Mid Auchinleck farm was one of a number of farms (Nether Auchinleck, Laigh Auchinleck, Mid Auchinleck, High Auchinleck and perhaps others) which were the remnant of a small, long gone feifdom of some sort which, probably in the 12th or 13 century, ran from the shore of the Clyde (Nether Auchinleck) inland to the high ground behind Port Glasgow (High Auchinleck). Today, 2022, only High Auchinleck remains. Nothing else is known of this entity.

Situated between the housing estates of Slaemuir and Devol. The area consists of many streets all starting with the letter M. e.g. Methil, Milton, Mallaig and Moidart. At present there are no amenities in the immediate vicitinity.
