= Middlestone =

Village in United Kingdom

Coordinates: 54.675°N 1.611°W

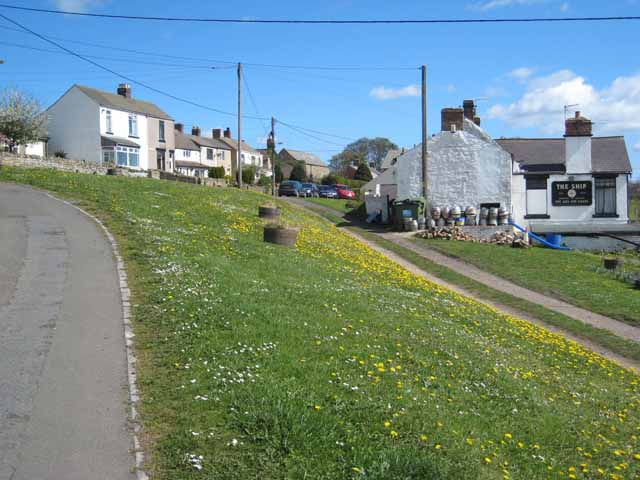

- Location within County Durham
- Population: 67 (2001 census)
- Unitary authority: County Durham
- Ceremonial county: Durham
- Region: North East
- Country: England
- Sovereign state: United Kingdom

Middlestone is a village and former civil parish in the County Durham district, in the ceremonial county of Durham, England. It is situated to the south of Spennymoor, near Kirk Merrington. In the 2001 census Middlestone had a population of 67.

== Civil parish ==
Middlestone was formerly a township in the parish of Auckland-St. Andrew, from 1866 Middlestone was a civil parish in its own right, on 1 April 1937 the parish was abolished and merged with Bishop Auckland, part also went to form Spennymoor. In 1931 the parish had a population of 1812.
