= Old West Kirk =

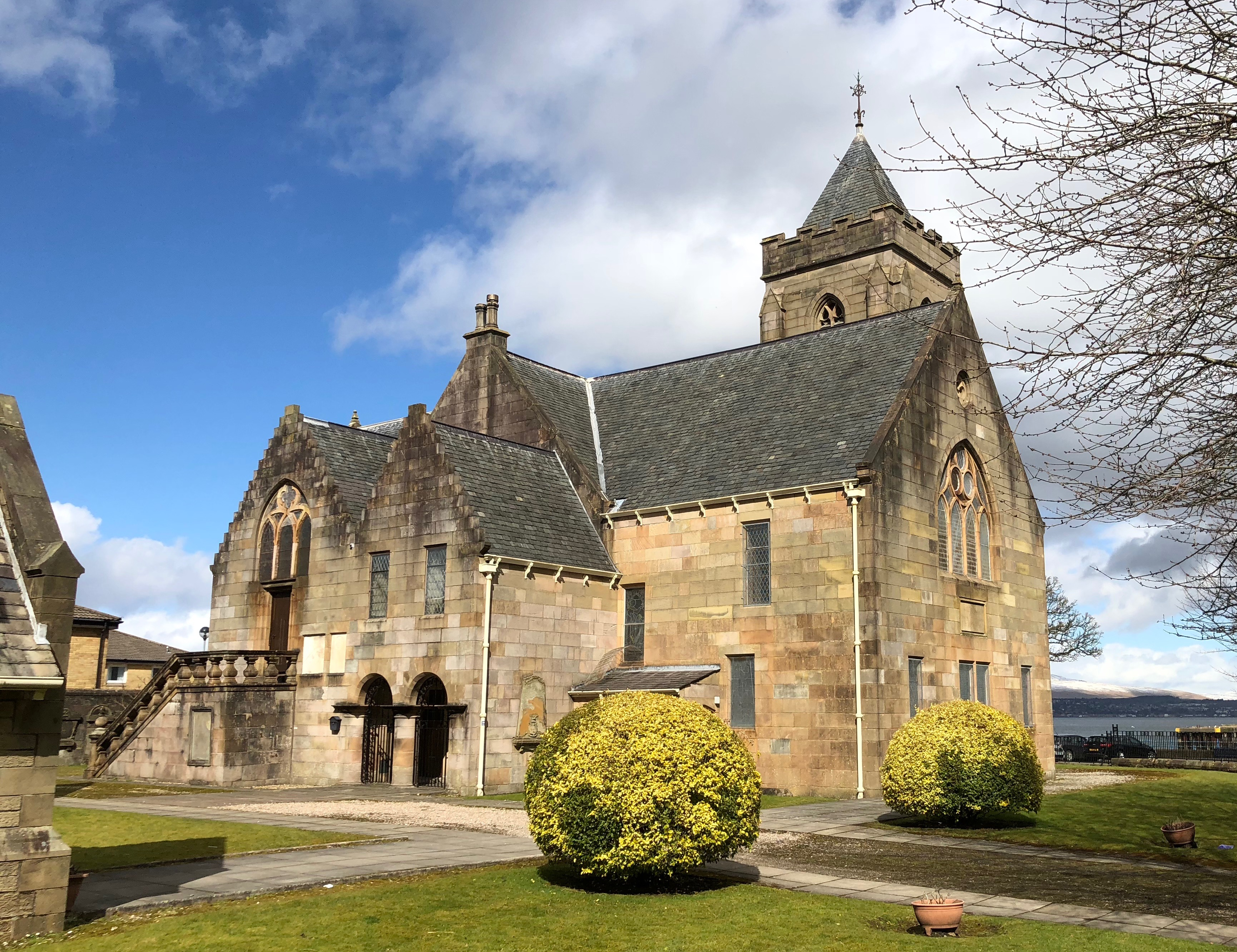
- Old West Kirk at the Esplanade, Greenock
- Old West Kirk
- 55°57′22″N 4°46′03″W
- Country: Scotland
- Denomination: Church of Scotland
- Churchmanship: Presbyterian
- Website: Lyle Kirk Greenock Website

History
- Founded: 1591

Architecture
- Heritage designation: Category B
- Designated: 1971

The Old West Kirk of the Church of Scotland, authorised by a 1589 Royal Charter and first opened in 1591, is noted as the first Presbyterian church built in Scotland following the Scottish Reformation, and the first approved by the Parliament of Scotland. At an early stage, east and west aisles were added as transepts, giving the church its cruciform plan.

Over time, the town of Greenock grew around the church, which was enlarged and had galleries added to accommodate the congregation. From 1761 other churches were built to serve the growing population, and in 1841 the Old West Kirk was closed when the congregation moved to a new West Kirk. The old kirk gradually became derelict, then it was heavily restored and reopened on Christmas Day 1864. The architect James Salmon supervised the works and added a tower, and the church subsequently incorporated a major collection of Pre-Raphaelite stained glass windows.

Shipyards developed between the churchyard and the Clyde, and in 1917 Harland and Wolff began negotiations to enlarge their yard over the churchyard. They provided a site further along the coast, and built the Pirrie Hall on the new site as a church hall which was used as temporary accommodation for the congregation from February 1925, while the kirk was rebuilt. In January 1928 the Old West Kirk opened in its new location on the Esplanade of Greenock. In 2011 it was amalgamated with two other churches into the Lyle Kirk, Greenock. It was subsequently opened to the public on days when cruise ships called at Greenock, and Inverclyde Tourist Group provided guided visits with a talk on the history of the kirk, but with the onset of the COVID-19 pandemic tours became unavailable. The church was sold in 2022 for continuing use as community space, in February 2024 minor improvements were organised.

== Context ==
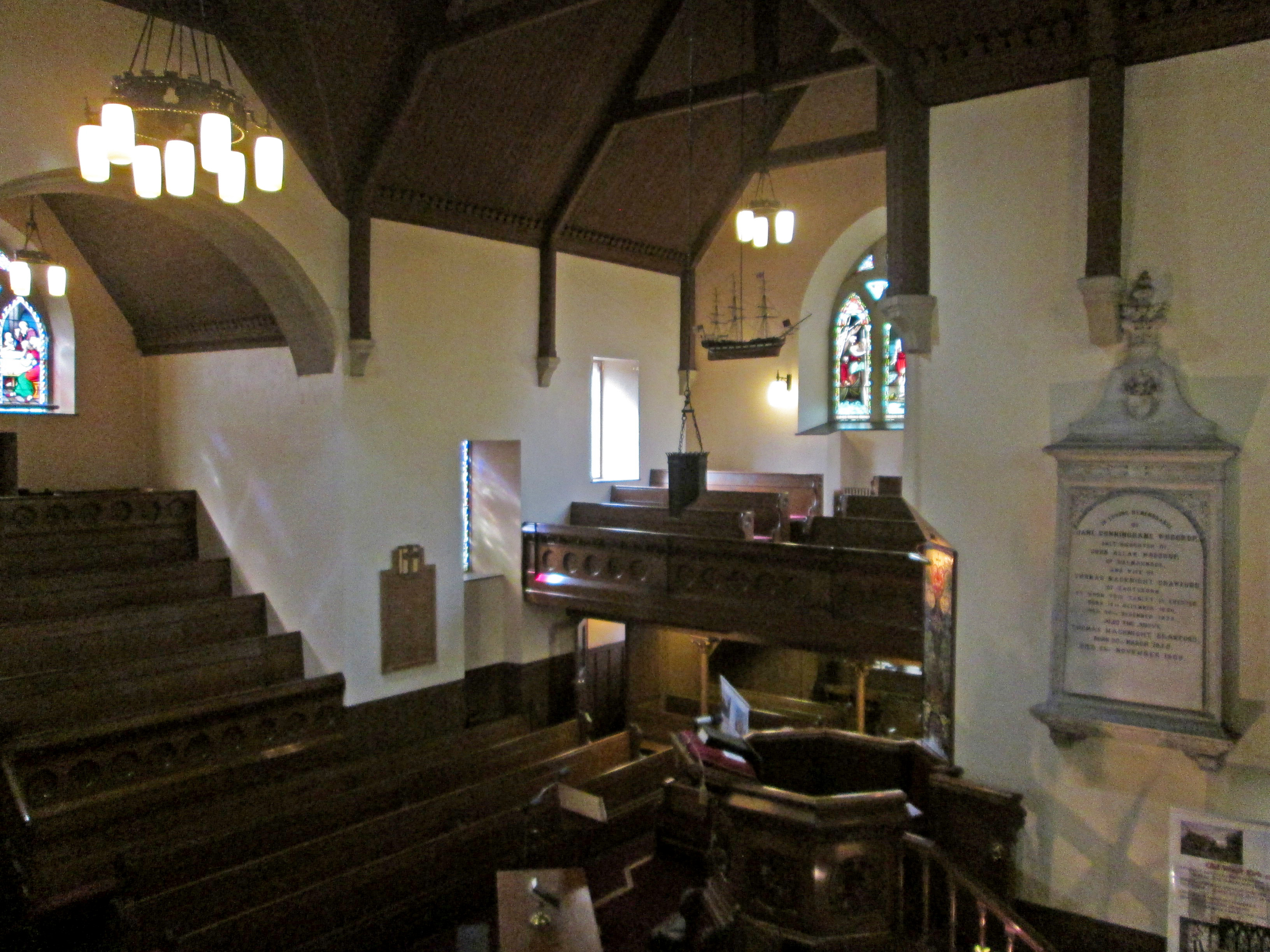
The Schaw Aisle, and the Sailor's Loft over the nave

The feudal barony of Greenock lay along the southern shore of the River Clyde estuary, where it opens out into the Firth of Clyde, between the Devol Burn at its eastern boundary to the Barony of Finlaystone in the parish of Kilmacolm, and the West Burn at the boundary to Finnart. Around 1400 Malcolm Galbraith died with no sons, and Greenock was divided between his daughters to become two baronies: the eldest married Crawfurd of Kilbirnie and inherited Easter Greenock Castle, while Wester Greenock went to the younger daughter who married Schaw of Sauchie. Around 1540 the adjoining area of Finnart passed to the Schaw family, extending their holdings westward to the boundary of Gourock, and in 1542 John Schaw founded Wester Greenock castle.

At this time there is no record of any village; retainers and servants lived at the castles, while most of the inhabitants were fishing families in temporary huts in small straggling groups on the coast. There were a few chapels: one at Chapelton overlooking the Devol Burn, and St. Lawrence near Wester Greenock castle (at what later became the south-east corner of Virginia and Rue-end Streets). Near the West Burn, the name Kilblain suggests a cell or chapel of Saint Blane.

== Foundation ==
The Scottish Reformation of 1560 closed the Greenock chapels, and the parish church was set up around 5.5 miles (8.9 km) distant at Inverkip, a return journey of 11 miles (18 km) over difficult terrain. An early Church Commission later cited authorities including "Johne Craufurd of Kilburnie Johne Schawe of Greenok" and "Patrick Rae in Chapeltone" to support their assessment (in Scots miles) of the distance as "four large myles vith dyveris great burnes and watteris in the way quhill in the vinter sessone are vnpassable and the number of people many."

Schaw used his influence at court to overcome this problem, and on 18 November 1589 James VI of Scotland granted a charter, signed at "Halyruid-hous", authorising Schaw to build a church and a manse, and set out a graveyard. King James was "movit with the ernest zeill and grite affection our lovit Johnne schaw of grenok hes ay had to goddis glorie and propagatioun of the trew religioun", and approved the aim that the "puir pepill" dwelling upon his lands and heritage, who were "all fischers and of a ressounable nowmer, duelland four myles fra their parroche kirk, and having ane greit river to pas over to the samyn, May haif ane ease in winter seasoun". The issue date of the original charter is unclear as James VI was in Norway in November 1589.

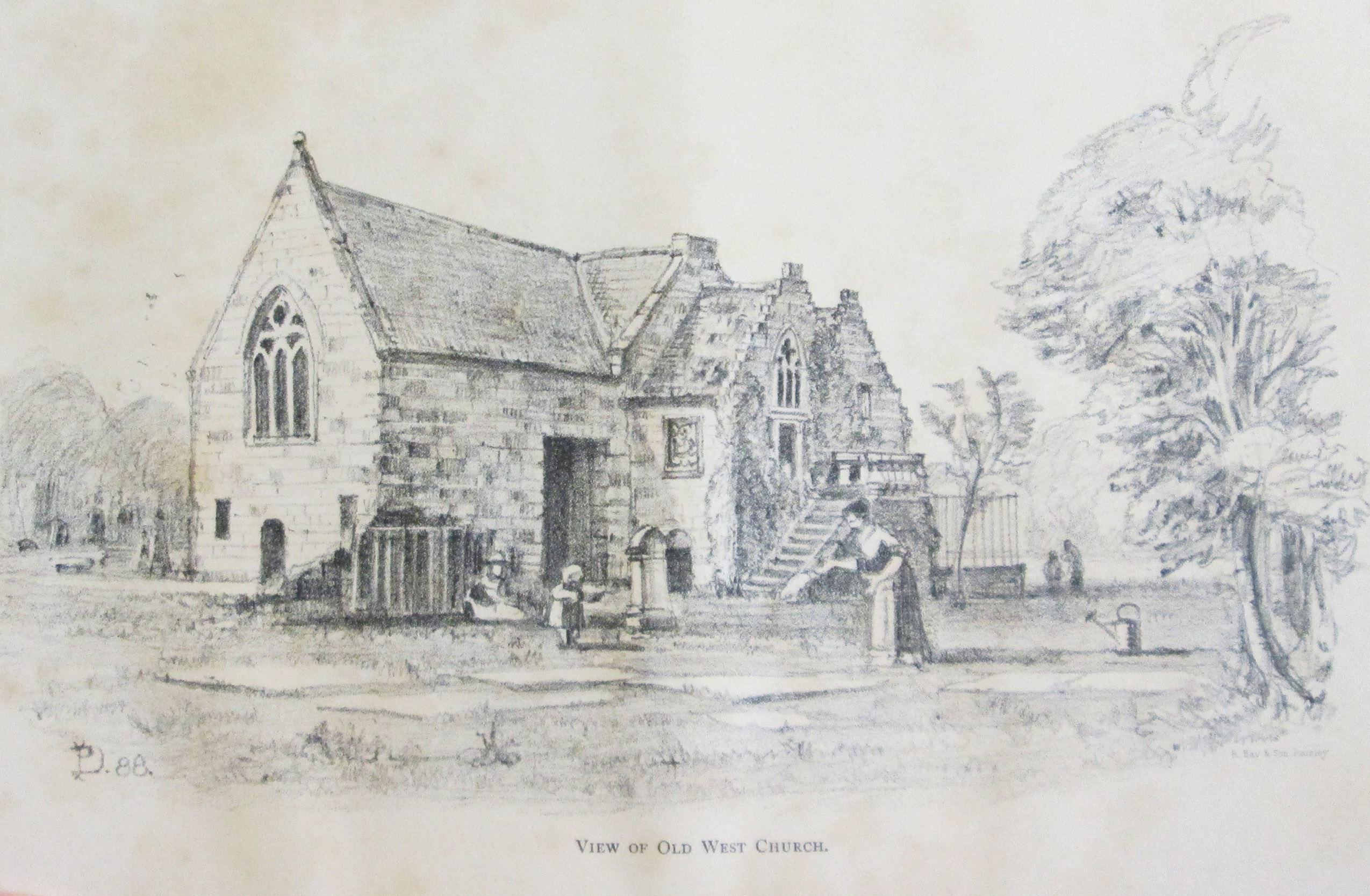
Sketch of the kirk as it was from around 1700 to 1841.

The church was then built at a cost of 3,000 merks Scots, or £166 133. 4d. sterling, and was opened on 4 October 1591. This was the first Presbyterian church built in Scotland following the Scottish Reformation.

In 1592 the Parliament of Scotland passed an act "For appreving of the kirk biggit be Johnne Schaw of Grenok", making it the first presbyterian church confirmed by the parliament. The Act reiterated the original charter. Another act of parliament in 1594 disjoined Schaw's lands of Greenock, Finnart, and Spangock from Inverkip, and assigned them to the new parish of Greenock, but it was not until 1636 that the lords commissioners for the plantation of churches decreed that the parish should also cover Easter Greenock and various other lands, with Shaw of Greenock as the patron of the enlarged parish. Johnne Schawe died in 1593, he may have been buried under the east aisle.

== Original location and layout ==
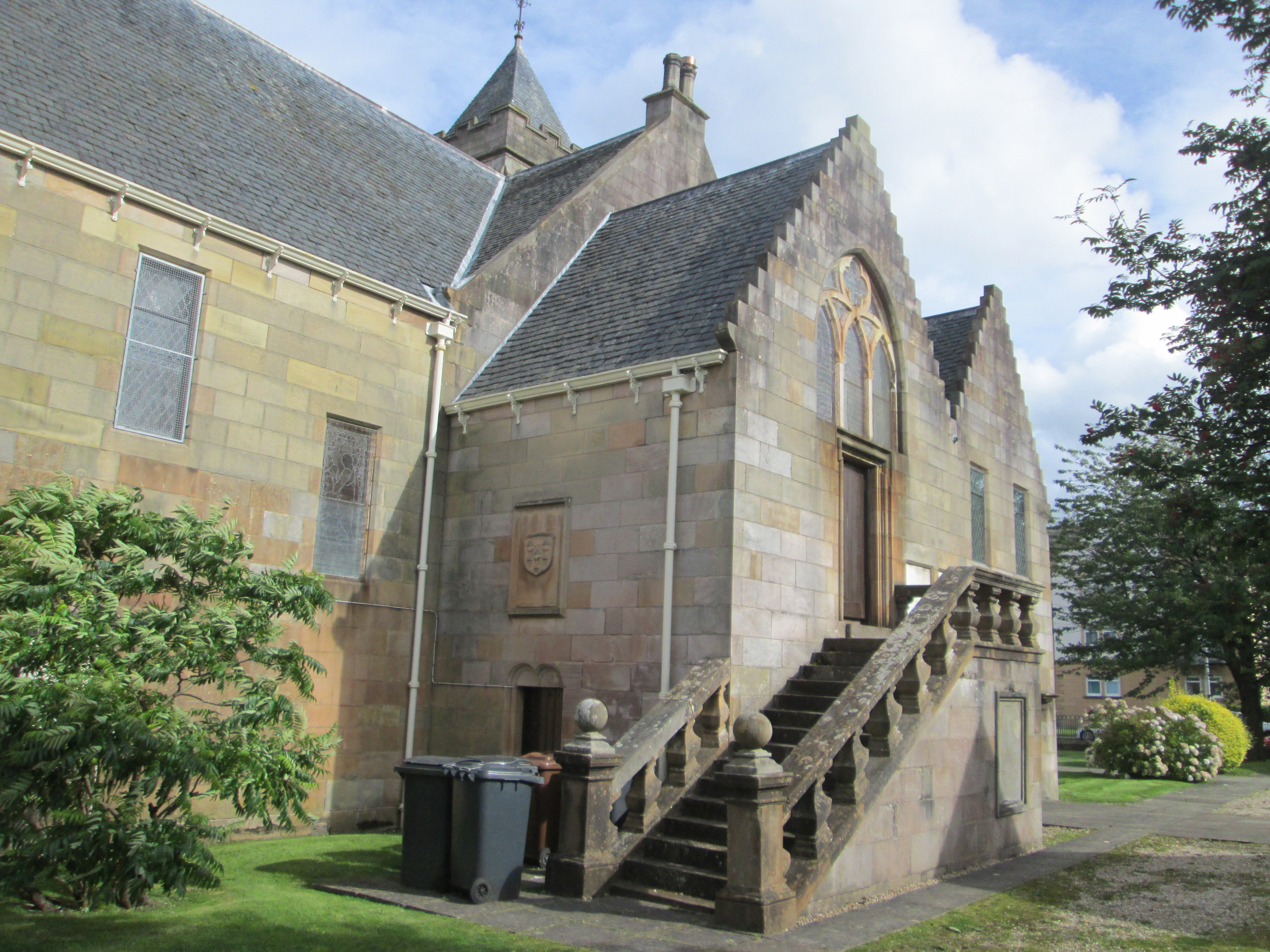
Entrance to the Schaw Aisle

The church stood in its Kirkyard towards the east end of its glebe of green fields at the seaside coast of the River Clyde, adjacent to the west bank of the West Burn estuary. The manse was to the north of the kirkyard, near the sea. The kirk's rectangular nave was oriented roughly north–south, with the entrance at the south gable. Inside, paving just over 6 feet (1.8 m) wide ran from there to the north wall, and formed a passageway. A communion table in the style of the time ran the full length of the passageway, with seats on each side and a recess at about the middle of the table for the minister to take the communion service. Except on Sacrament Sundays, these seats were reserved for the poor as a place of honour. The main part of the floor was earthen, at some stage covered by open timber slats. The earth could still be seen between the slats, and over the years a number of coins fell through. The church windows were fitted with clear glass in small square panes, the walls were whitewashed inside, and it had a flat plaster ceiling.

Aisles added to the east and west formed transepts which gave the church a cruciform plan. A later claim that the east wing had been in possession of the Schaws from the outset suggests that this aisle was built in 1591, the west wing may have been built at the same time.

=== Development ===
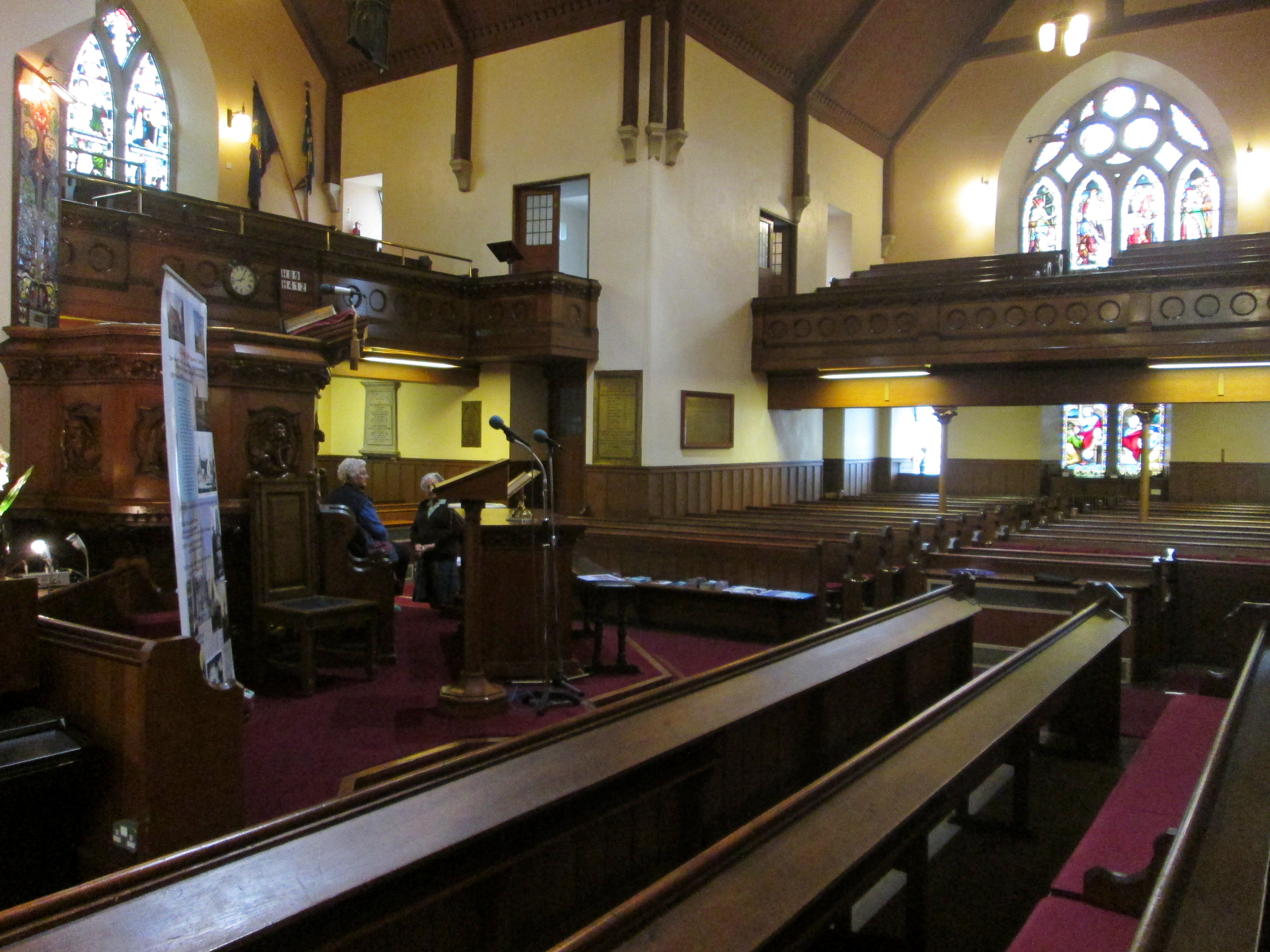
View from the nave, with the Cartsburn Aisle on the left, looking towards the Farmer's Loft.

A fishing community settled near the kirk, with Rue End to the east referring to the "row end" of an early row of cottages: the 1654 Blaeu Atlas of Scotland shows "Grinok toune". Around this time, a curved dyke near the Crawfurd house at Cartsburn formed the first harbour in the area, and from 1671 the village of Cartsdyke developed at this pier.

Congregations began to exceed the capacity of the kirk. In 1635, when the parish was extended to include the Easter Greenock lands of Crawfurd of Kilbirnie, the "Laird of Kilburnie" offered to enlarge the south aisle by 22 feet (6.7 m). This had still not been done when a Presbytery meeting in 1657 proposed extending the church to the east, but the Schaw Laird of Greenock objected as the east aisle was "appointed for him, and whereof he had been in continual possession since the erection of the kirk", and protested at the proposed expense to his tenants. In 1674 Craufurd of Cartsburn offered to bear a proportion of the costs of enlarging the church with sufficient seats for his family and tenants, a new manse, and a school for "training up the young ones". In 1677 there was agreement for the Lairds of Greenock to fund expanding the north and south aisles, while Thomas Craufurd was to fund extending the west aisle; "the side walls and gavels to be the height and breadth of the auld building. The pulpit to be placed in the west corner of the south aisle."

About 1696 the west (Carts-burn) aisle and north gable were extended by 15 feet (4.6 m), and the south gable by 10 feet (3.0 m), so the cruciform church was now overall about 74 feet (23 m) from north to south, and 63 feet (19 m) over the transepts. A new two storey extension was built at north side of the Schaw aisle, with Sir John Schaw's retiring room on the first floor. The ground floor, with open arches supported on a pillar, was used as a mortuary.

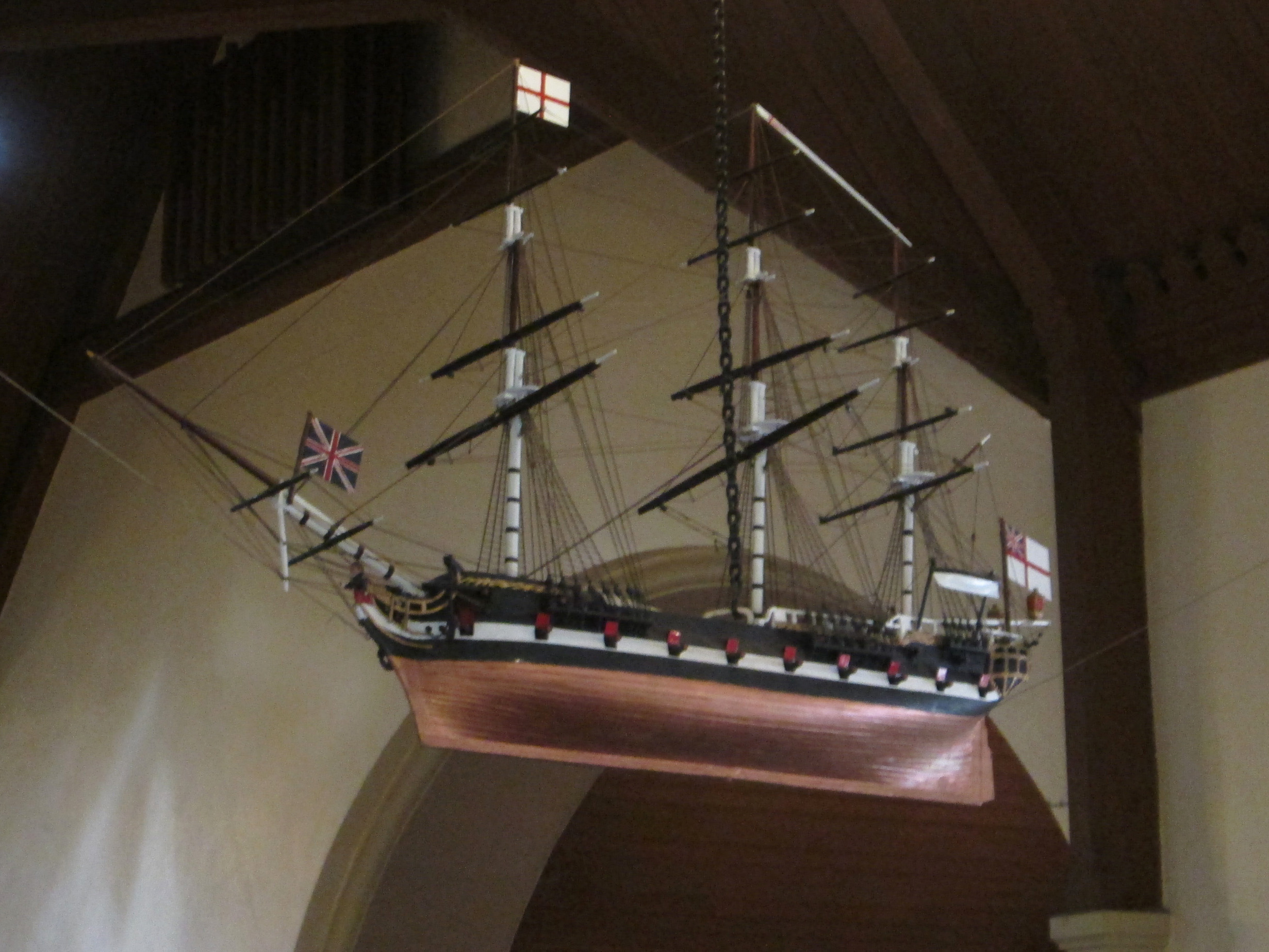
Scale model of a 20-gun frigate suspended above the Sailor's loft.

Lofts (or galleries) with nearly level floors were added above the main ground floor; permission was given on 9 December 1697 to build the Sailors' Loft above the south aisle, which then had the only stair inside the church. The Farmer's Loft was built above the north aisle, and the west gallery was the Cartsburn Loft. Adjacent to it, a gallery forming the family seat of the Crawfurds of Cartsburn was built against the north wall of their aisle, appearing rather like a four-poster bed. The family seat of James Watt's parents and grandparents was below this gallery. The Schaw east aisle was fully taken up by Sir Michael's gallery which projected out from the wall and had two oak pillars and two pilasters holding up a canopy over something like three private boxes. A sixth small gallery containing three pews extended from this gallery to the Farmer's Loft. At this time the church had seven doors, including gallery doors which led to external stairs. When Schaw's retiring room was converted into the vestry, it still had access only through the east aisle gallery, so the minister had to go outside, down the external stair and round to a ground floor door near the pulpit.

Greenock was boosted by the construction of its harbour in 1710, and the growth of shipbuilding began when John Scott's started building fishing boats on the east bank of the West Burn a year later. By 1729 there were proposals to build a second church for the increasing population: from 1741 services were held in a large loft in the Royal Close, near Rue-End street. In 1758 work began in Cathcart Square on the Mid Kirk, which opened in 1761. At this time, the original church became known as the Old Parish Church, and later the West Parish Church. From 1774, more churches followed. The walls of the West church were raised by about 3.5 feet (1.1 m) in 1767, prior to renewal of the roof. A new Manse to the west was feued in 1787. In the 1790s the pews were square.

=== Decay, closure in 1841 ===
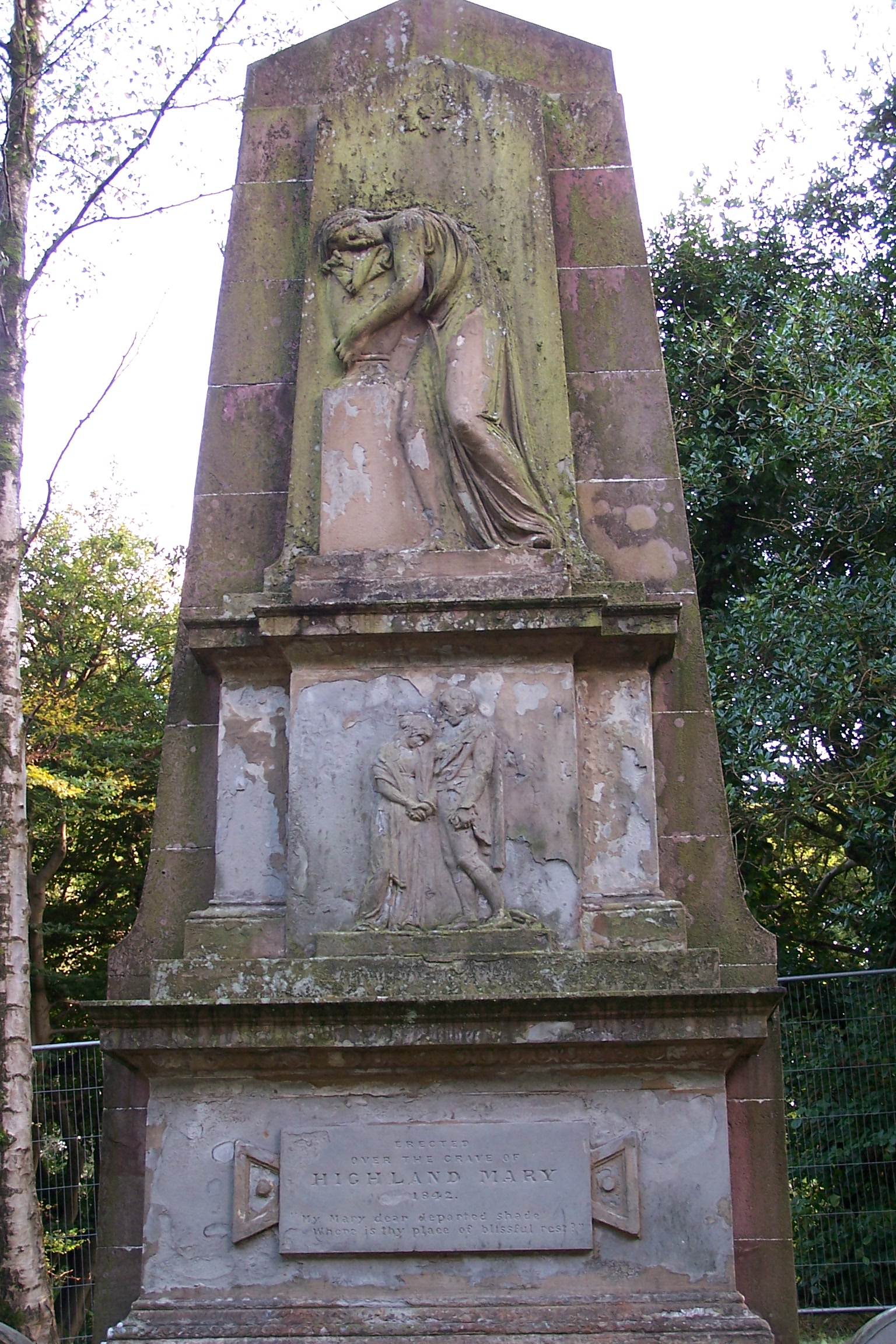
1786 grave of Highland Mary, marked by 1842 monument.

The Kirkyard was expanded in 1657 and 1721 to provide increased graveyard space, but in 1773 a request for further extension was resisted due to pressure of demand for land in the town. After prolonged litigation, the Inverkip Street cemetery on the south side of the town was opened in 1786. This is the burial place of John Galt.

Mary Campbell (Highland Mary), a love of Robert Burns, was on a visit to her brother Robert, who was in Greenock to become an apprentice at Scott's Shipyard, when he fell ill. She nursed him, but fell ill herself, and died around October 1786, probably from typhus. She was buried in the old West Kirk churchyard, in a plot owned by her relative Peter McPherson.

Further expansion of the church was restricted by the full graveyard, which was about 2 feet (0.61 m) higher than the sparred earthen church floor. The kirk became damp and insanitary: for ventilation in summer, the doors had to be kept open. In 1835 the Presbytery was petitioned for improvements, but after investigation they concluded that it would be cheaper to build a new church on a different site. A site was chosen in 1838, then in 1841 the old church was closed and the congregation moved to the new West Church in Nelson Street.

During the Disruption of 1843 the minister and most of the congregation of the Gaelic Parish joined the Free Church and were granted temporary use of the old kirk for a year and a half while their new church was built in Jamaica Street. After that the old kirk again stood empty, and increasingly fell into disrepair.

== Restored in 1864 ==
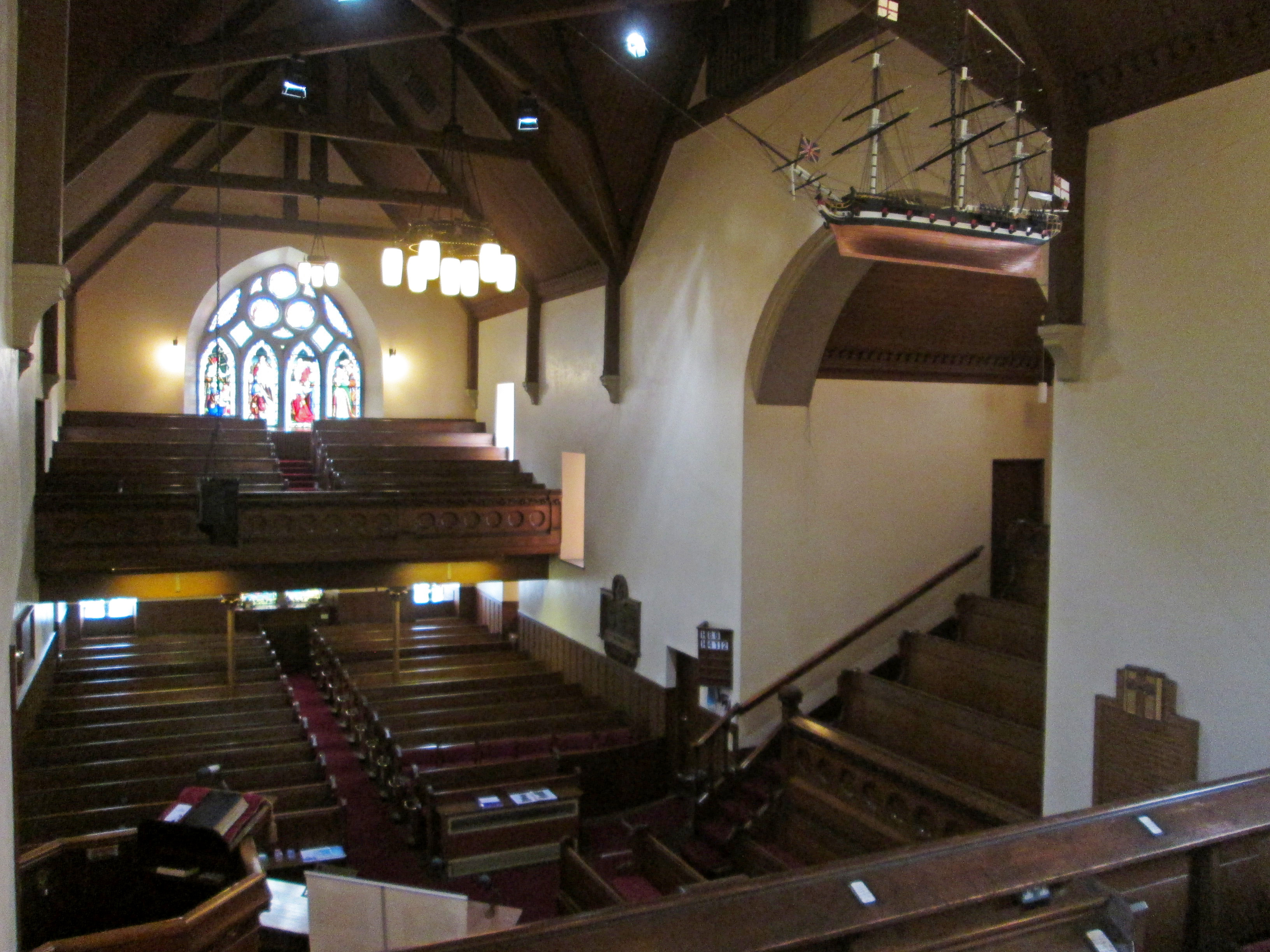
View from the Sailor's Loft to the Farmer's Loft, with the steeply raked Schaw Aisle on the right

Proposals to restore the old kirk were at first "laughed at as a Utopian idea", but subscriptions were raised and extensive restoration work was carried out in 1864 under the supervision of the architect James Salmon. The interior was gutted, and the old earthen floor dug out to lay an asphalt damp-proof layer: over 70 copper coins and two silver coins were found, the earliest from 1634; a silver shilling was dated 1824. The exterior walls were rebuilt in places and faced ashlar, and a church tower designed by Salmon was built at this time, incorporated stairs serving the Cartsburn Loft and the Farmer's Loft in place of the old external stairs. The walls were lined with lath and plaster painted a warm cream colour, and dark stained timber linings to the roof formed the ceiling. The church re-opened on Christmas Day, 1864.

In 1872 the kirk was officially named the North Parish Church, but remained generally known as the Old West Kirk. The galleries were now more steeply sloped. The Cartsburn gallery was rebuilt in 1873, and an organ fitted there in 1874. Across the nave, the Schaw aisle, then called the Sir Michael's gallery, was built with its front now a low wall in line with the nave, about 2 feet (0.61 m) high, and was steeply raked with four pews rising up to the level of the door leading to its external stairway. There were now only two other outside doors to the church: one was added to the old mortuary which became a porch, and the main entrance door was now in the centre of the gable to the Cartsburn Aisle.

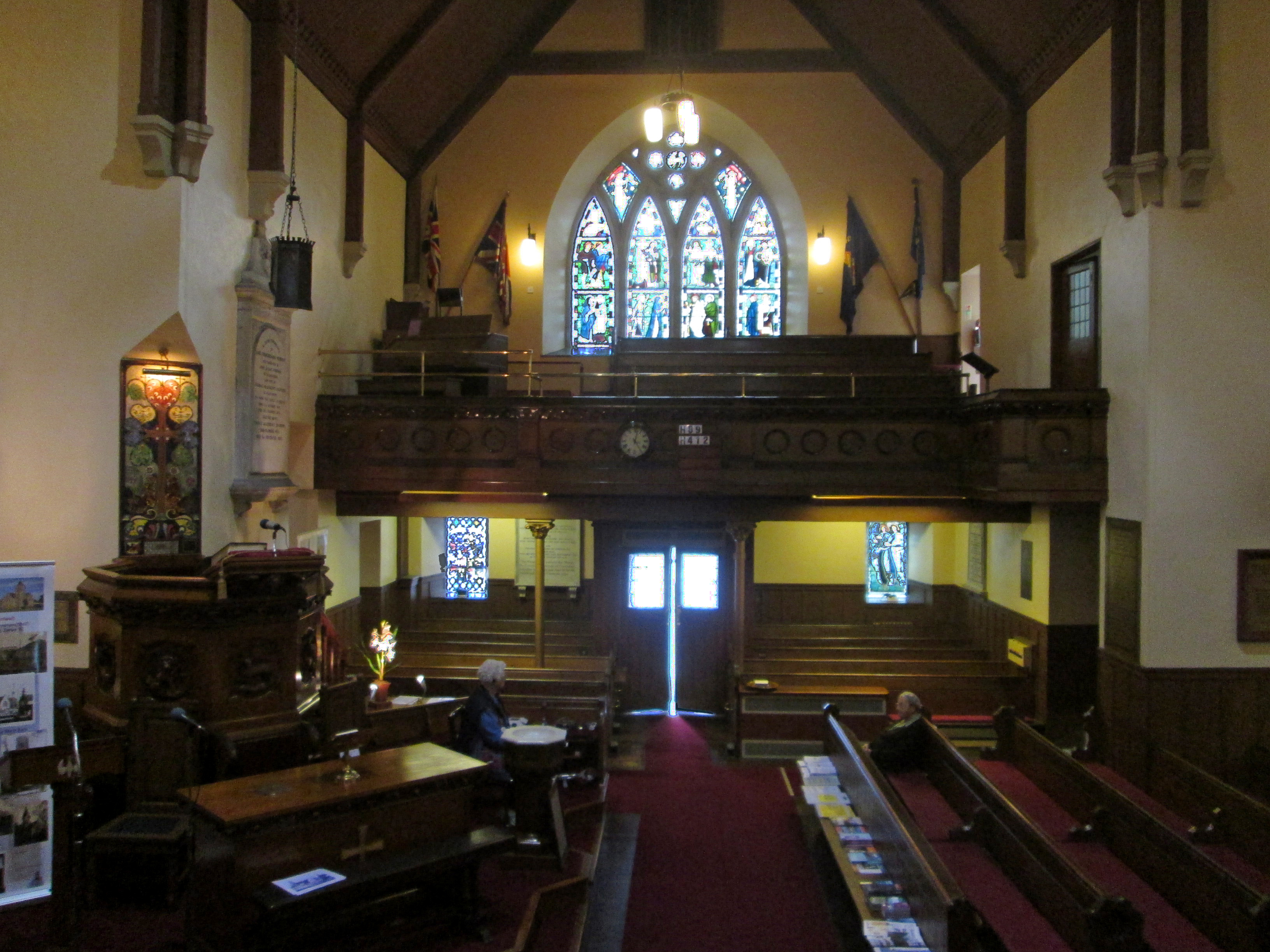
The Cartsburn gable, Lamb window over the main entrance

=== Stained glass windows ===
The kirk obtained a major collection of Pre-Raphaelite stained glass windows through the efforts of Allan Park Paton, librarian of the Greenock Library, who consulted Dante Gabriel Rossetti, and received a response from William Morris in February 1865.

The largest window in the church, at the Cartsburn gable, was supplied by Morris & Co. and is by Edward Burne-Jones on the topic of "Adoration of the Lamb". It includes nearly thirty figures, with 16 biblical characters in four lights, under angels giving praise, and at the top of the arch the Lamb at the centre of emblems of the Four Evangelists. Morris & Co. also supplied two smaller windows by Burne-Jones on the subjects of Faith and Music, and a window by Rossetti on Charity (or Caritas), which was installed in 1868.

A window by Daniel Cottier on the subject of Hope with her Anchor was added by Cottier in 1884 in "memory of his grandfather Archibald M'Lean master mariner of this port." Other windows in the church were provided by Ballantine & Co., of Edinburgh.

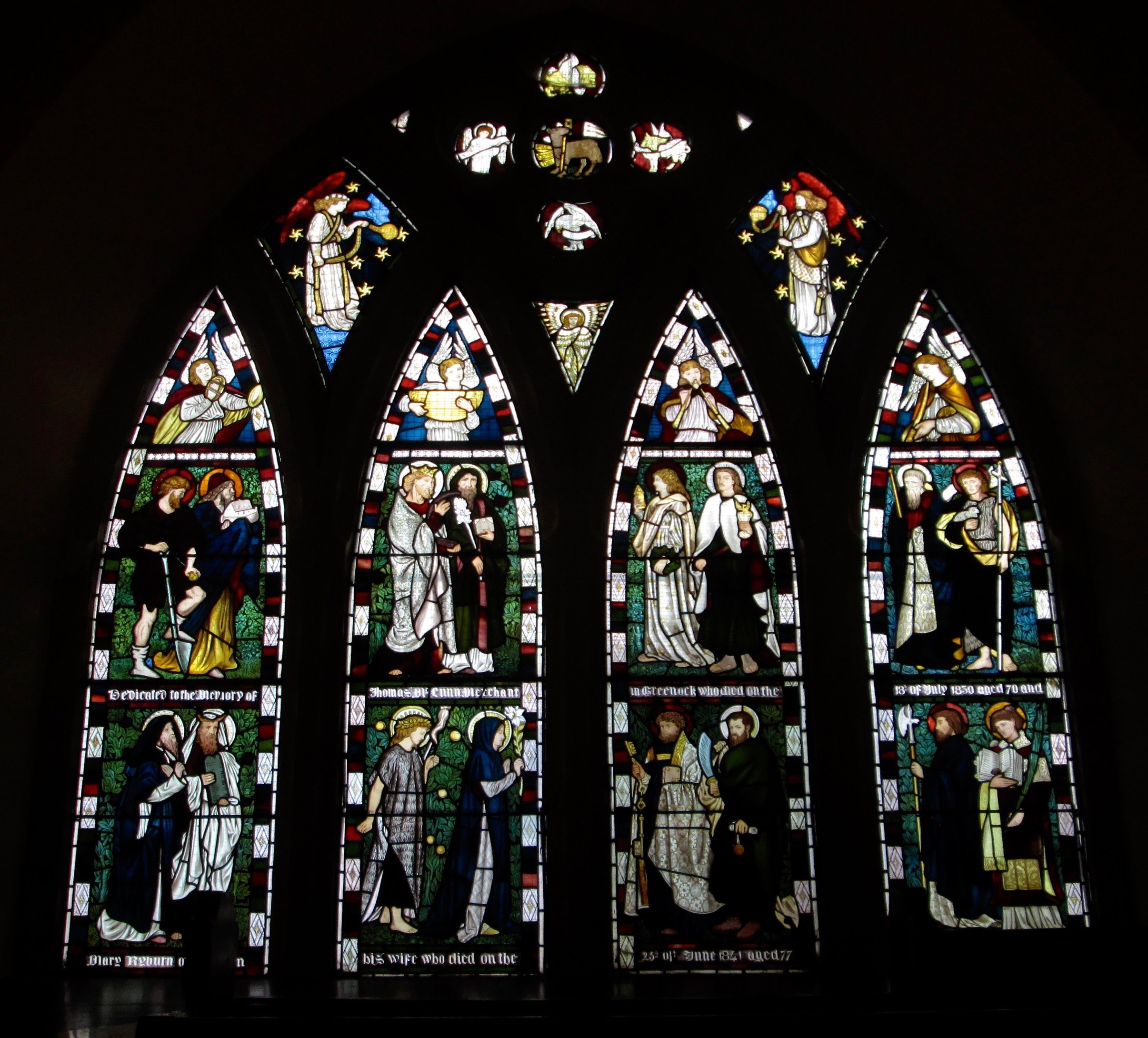
Adoration of the Lamb by Edward Burne-Jones

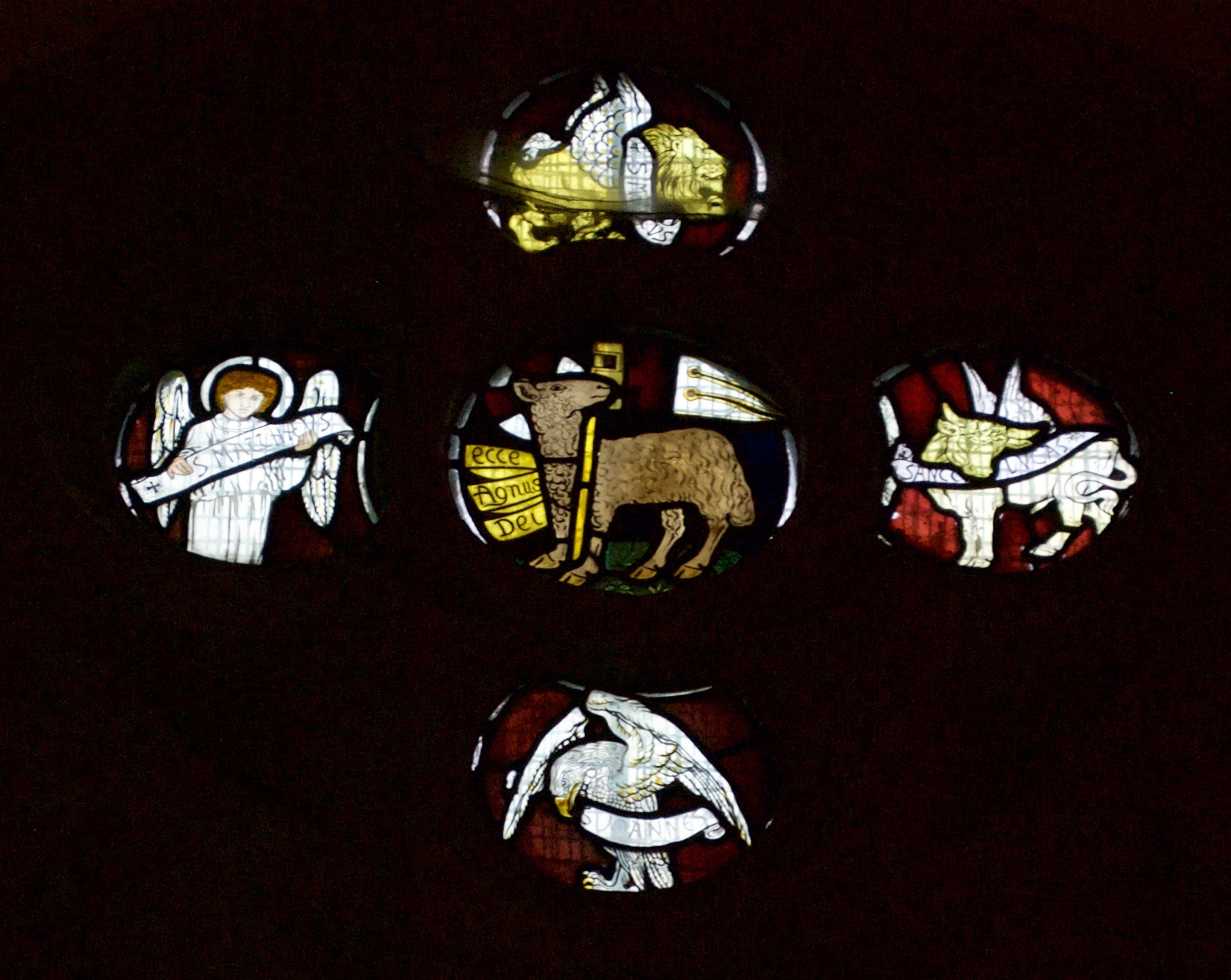
Detail from Adoration of the Lamb

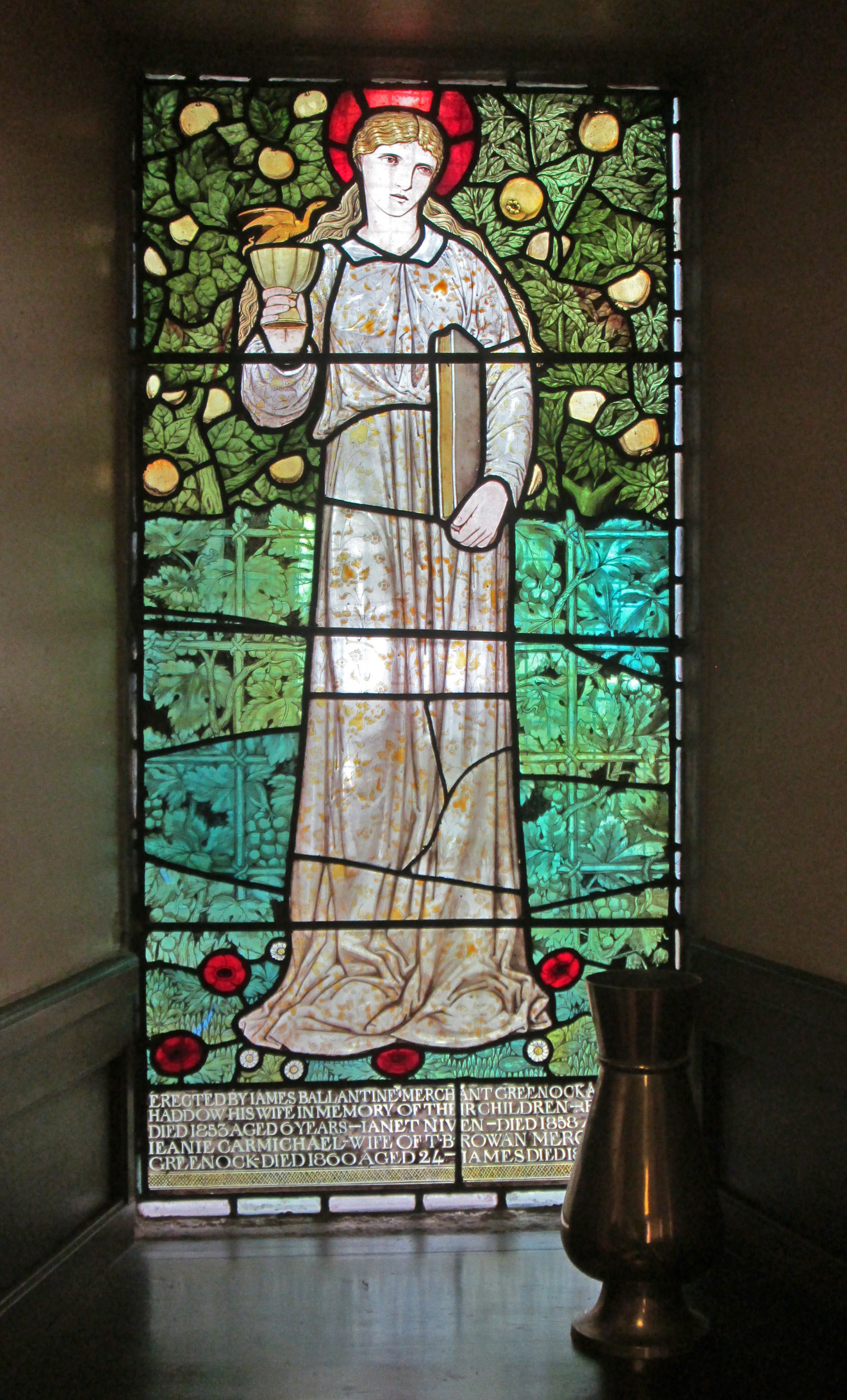
Faith by Edward Burne-Jones

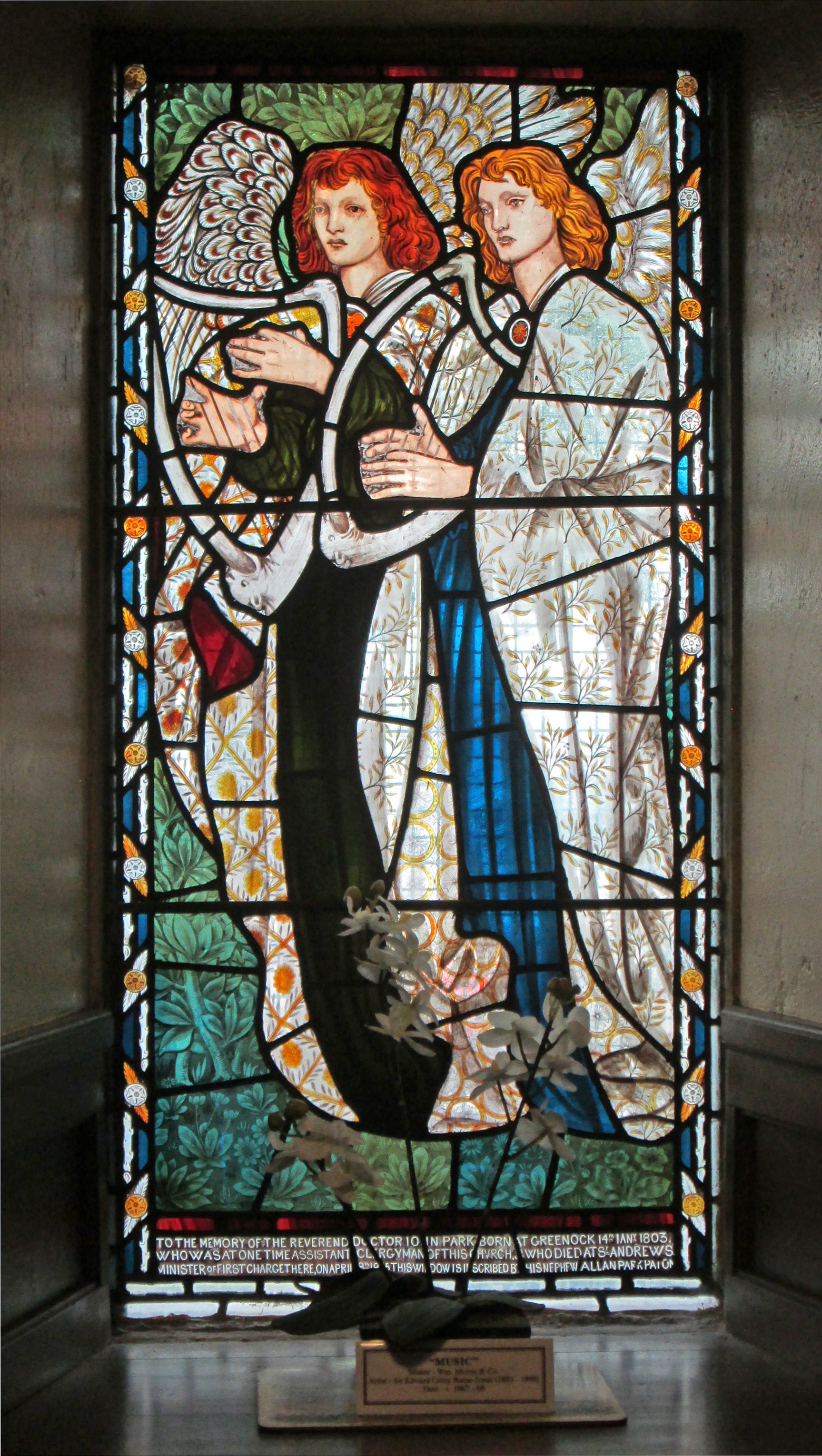
Music by Edward Burne-Jones

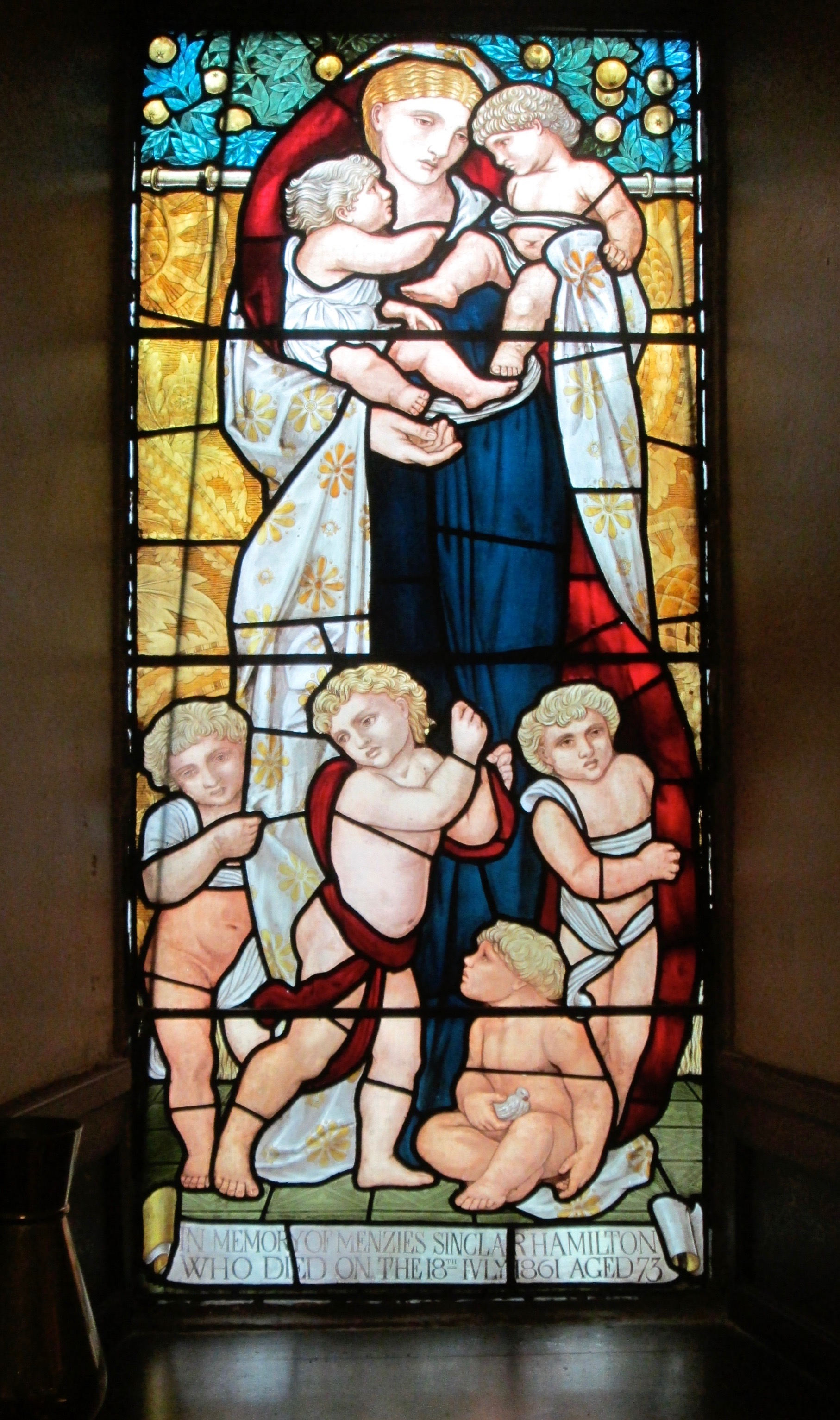
Caritas by Dante Gabriel Rossetti

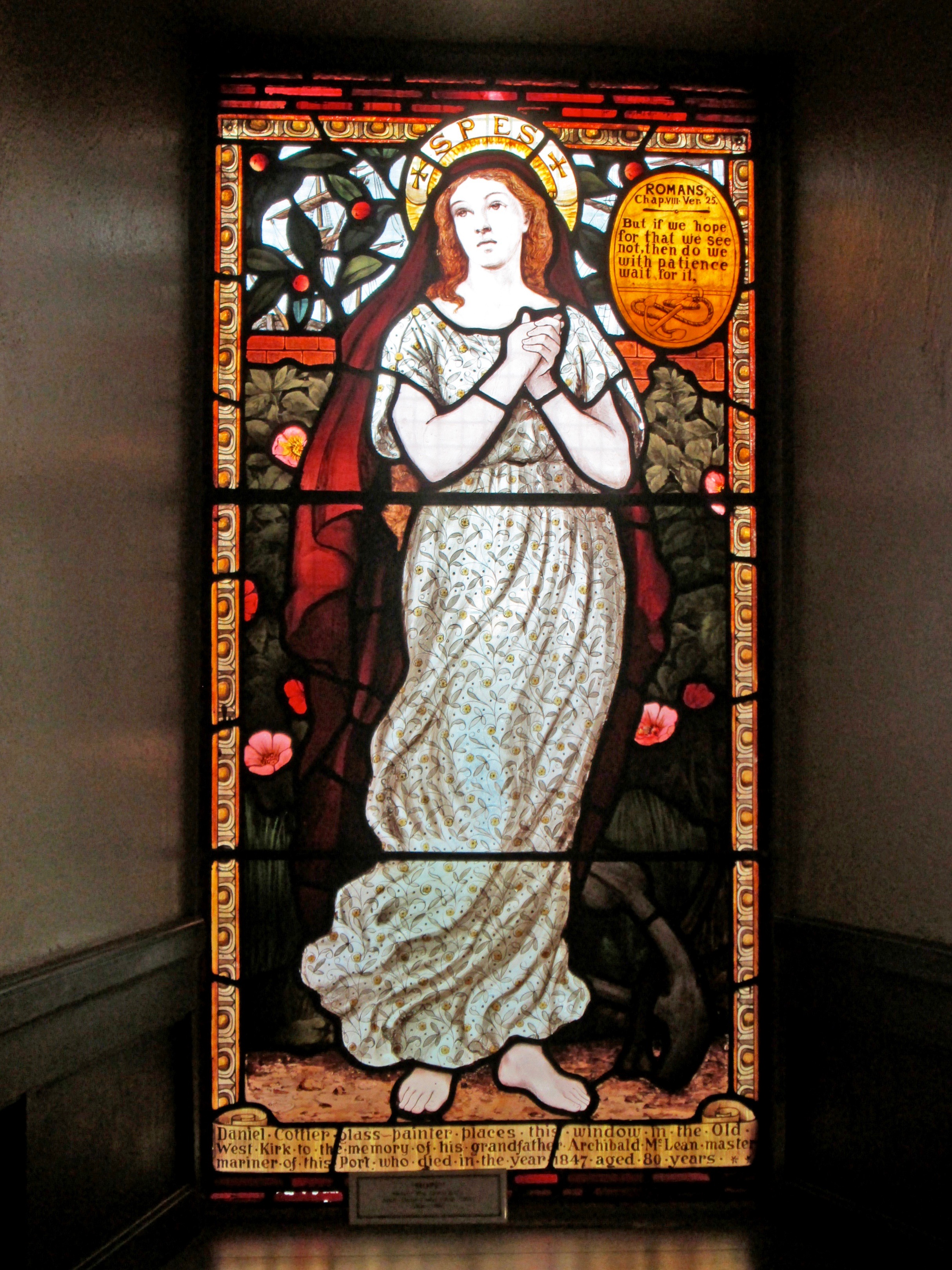
Hope with her Anchor by Daniel Cottier

== Move to the Esplanade ==
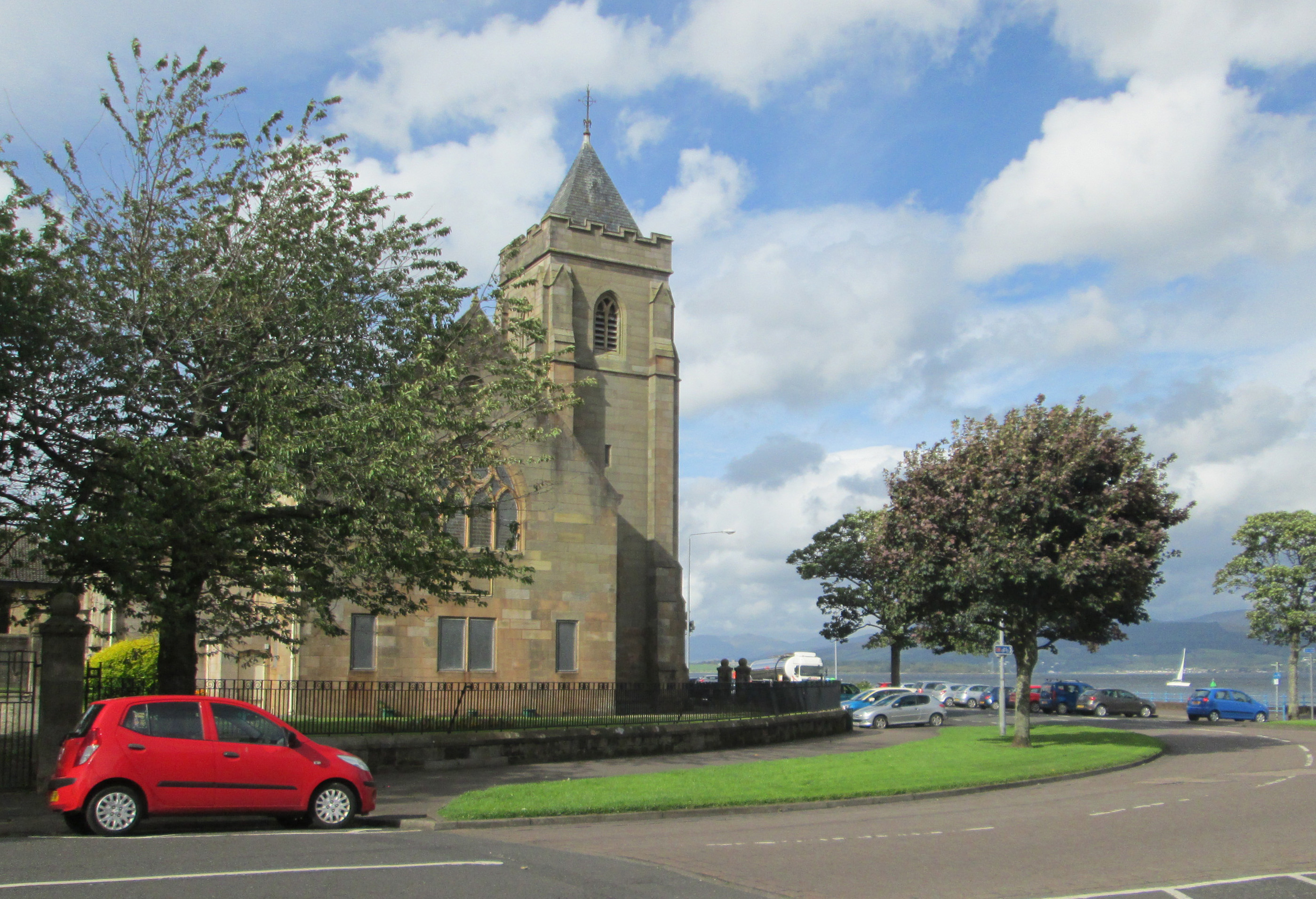
Farmer's gable and new tower, from Campbell Street

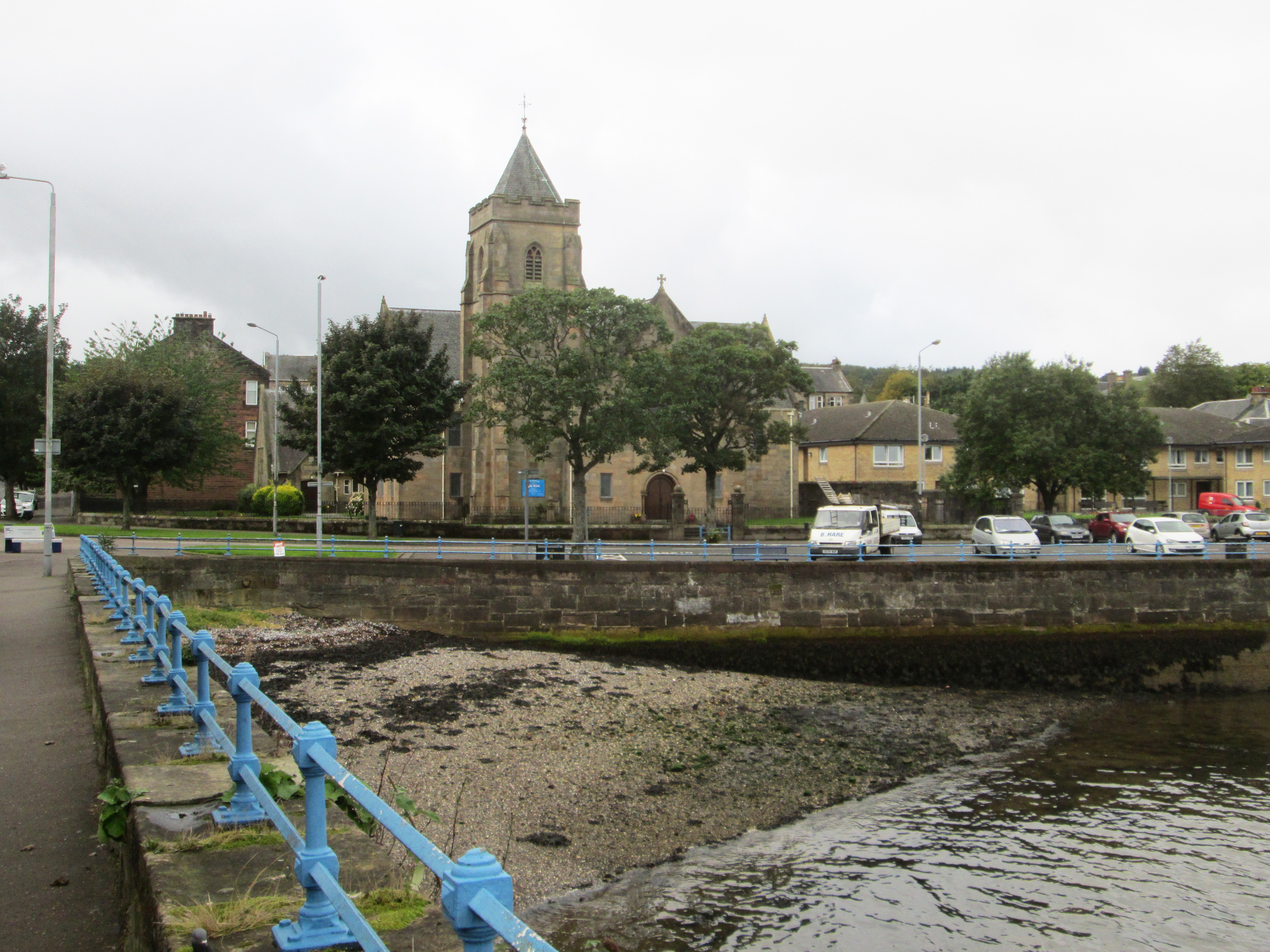
The Kirk at the Esplanade

From 1711, John Scott began shipbuilding on the opposite bank of the Westburn, and from 1740 onwards shipyards increasingly encroached on the land between the Kirkyard and the Clyde. Caird & Company took over two shipyard berths close to the church in 1871, and photographs show ships under construction looming high above the kirk. In 1917 Caird & Co. were taken over by Harland and Wolff, which proposed huge expansion of the shipyard, taking over several properties including the original harbour, the kirk and the kirkyard. They offered generous compensation, including a new site about 0.5 miles (0.80 km) further west along the coast at the east end of Greenock's Esplanade, and agreed to have the kirk carefully taken down and re-erected. This was done under the supervision of the architect James Miller. A new tower was built to Miller's design, and the church was reoriented, so that the Cartsburn Aisle and the main entrance, which had originally faced west, now faced north-east.

The kirkyard had been in use as a cemetery from 1592 until it closed in 1857. Remains of the burials were re-interred in a mass grave in Greenock's central Cemetery, save for the grave of Mary Campbell (Highland Mary). The 1842 monument to her, designed by John Mossman, was moved from the old Kirkyard to Greenock Cemetery, and Mary's remains were re-interred under it on 13 November 1920 in a solemn ceremony.

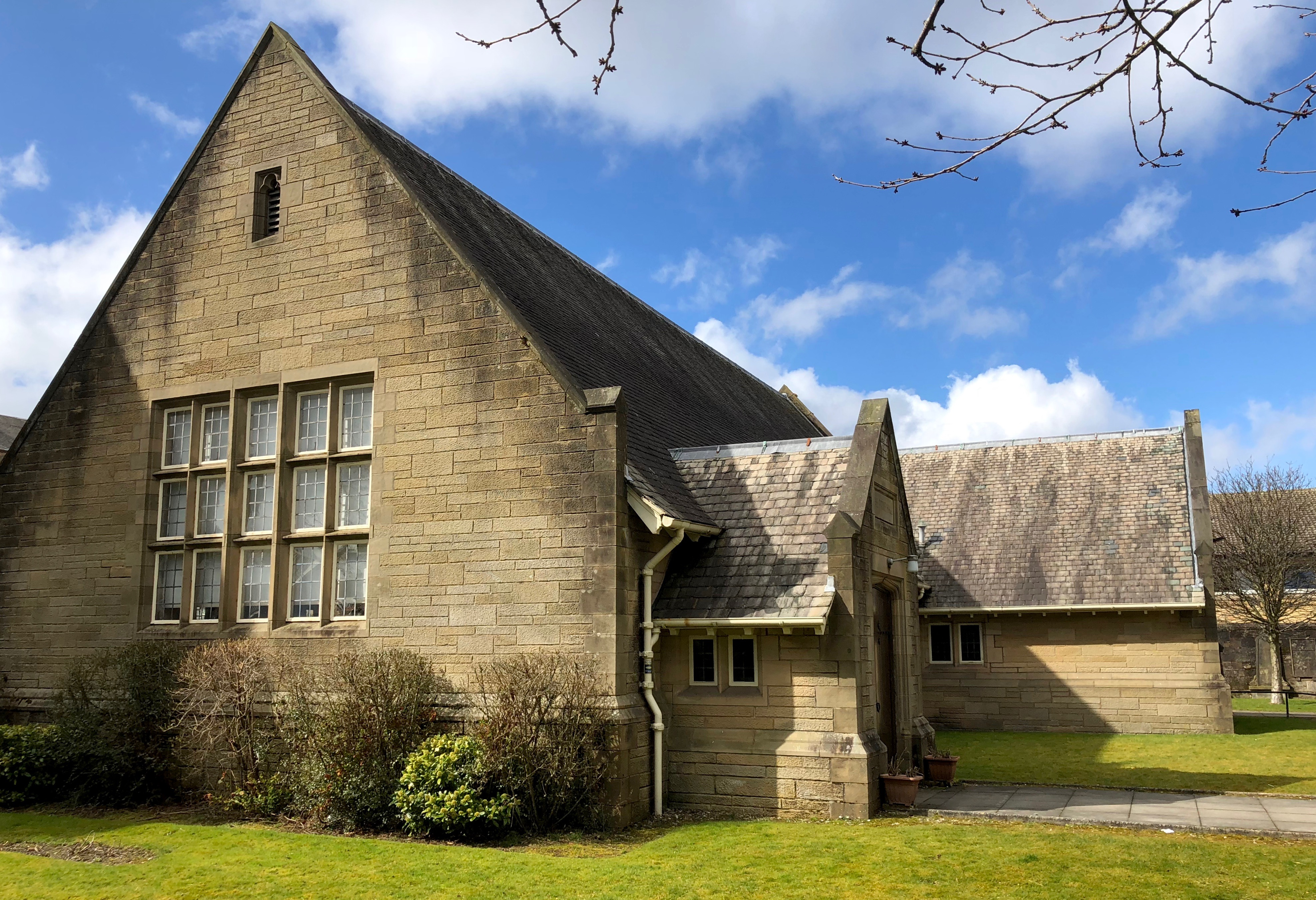
The Pirrie Hall to the south of the church

Harland and Wolff's contribution was organised by Lord Pirrie, and included provision of a new church hall on the new site, which would take the congregation during the works. He died before this happened. Five days after the church was closed for work to start, the Pirrie Hall named after him opened on 19 February 1925 and provided a temporary place of worship giving churchgoers the opportunity to watch progress on the replacement.

The stones of the old kirk were numbered, cleaned and moved to the new site at the Esplanade: there had been no decoration in the original Presbyterian church, but as well as mason's marks on the stones, there were hidden carvings of birds, fish and animals. Work on rebuilding began in March 1926, and finished in January 1928.

The kirk continued in full use until 2011, when it was amalgamated with two other churches into the Lyle Kirk, Greenock, Church of Scotland.

== Sale ==
In August 2022 the Church of Scotland put the property, including the church and Pirrie Hall, up for sale on the open market. The Old West Kirk Trust, the Inverclyde Heritage Network and RIG Arts are crowdfunding a possible purchase of the Kirk and other buildings.

== See also ==
- List of listed buildings in Greenock
