= Greenock Sheriff Court =

Judicial building in Greenock, Scotland

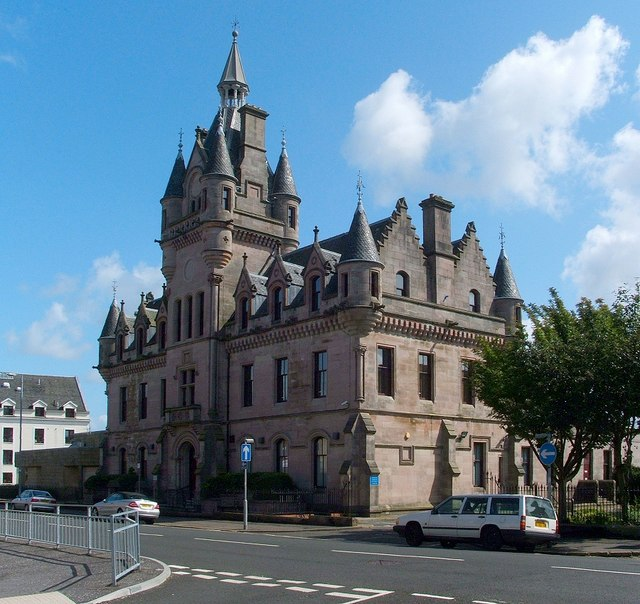
- The building in 2009

- Shown in Inverclyde
- 55.9496°N 4.7651°W
- Location: Nelson Street, Greenock

History
- Built: 1869

Site notes
- Architect(s): Peddie and Kinnear
- Architectural style: Scottish baronial style

Listed Building – Category B
- Official name: Greenock Sheriff Court and Justice of the Peace Court, including boundary wall, gatepiers and railings, and excluding single-storey extension to north and 2-storey extension to east, Nelson Street, Greenock
- Designated: 4 December 1980
- Reference no.: LB34133

Greenock Sheriff Court is a judicial building on Nelson Street in Greenock in Scotland. The structure, which continues to operate as a courthouse, is a Category B listed building.

== History ==
Until the early 19th century, all court hearings in Renfrewshire took place in Paisley. However, in 1815, permission was obtained to hold hearings in the old town house in Greenock, which has since been replaced by the Greenock Municipal Buildings. After finding this arrangement unsatisfactory, court officials decided to commission a dedicated courthouse, which was erected in Bank Street and was officially opened by Sheriff John Colin Dunlop in May 1834.

In the early 1860s, court officials decided that a more substantial court building was required. The site they selected was on the south side of Nelson Street. Construction of the new building started in 1864. It was designed by Peddie and Kinnear in the Scottish baronial style, built by John Coghill & Co in ashlar at a cost of £8,386, and was officially opened by Sheriff Patrick Fraser on 5 November 1869.

The design involved a symmetrical main frontage of seven bays facing onto Nelson Street. The central bay featured a four-stage tower. There was segmental headed doorway flanked by colonettes supporting a hood mould in the first stage, a mullioned and transomed window with a hood mould and a balcony in the second stage, three tall segmental headed windows in the third stage, and two small round headed widows flanked by bartizans and surmounted by a pediment in the fourth stage. The whole structure was surmounted a pyramid-shaped roof, a small spire and a weather vane. The entire structure was 112 feet (34 m) high. The wings of three bays each were fenestrated by segmental headed windows with hood moulds on the ground floor, by sash windows with moulded surrounds on the second floor and by dormer windows with finials at attic level. Internally, the principal rooms were the offices of the sheriff, sheriff clerk and procurator fiscal at the front on the ground floor, and a double-height main courtroom at the back on the ground floor.

A prison at the rear of the courthouse was demolished in 1936. The Governor's House, standing to the southwest of the main building, survived but was later sold for private residential use.

In October 1999, the building was the venue for a high-profile trial involving three women accused of boarding a Trident support vessel in Loch Goil and throwing computer equipment overboard. Sheriff Margaret Gimblett, having controversially deemed nuclear weapons to be illegal under international law, instructed the jury to find the three women not guilty. A few months later, in the High Court of Justiciary in Edinburgh, Lord Hardie ruled that the defence was mistaken.

The local justice of the peace court moved into the building in December 2009.

== See also ==
- List of listed buildings in Greenock
