= Greenock Blitz =

German bombing raids on Greenock, Scotland during WW2

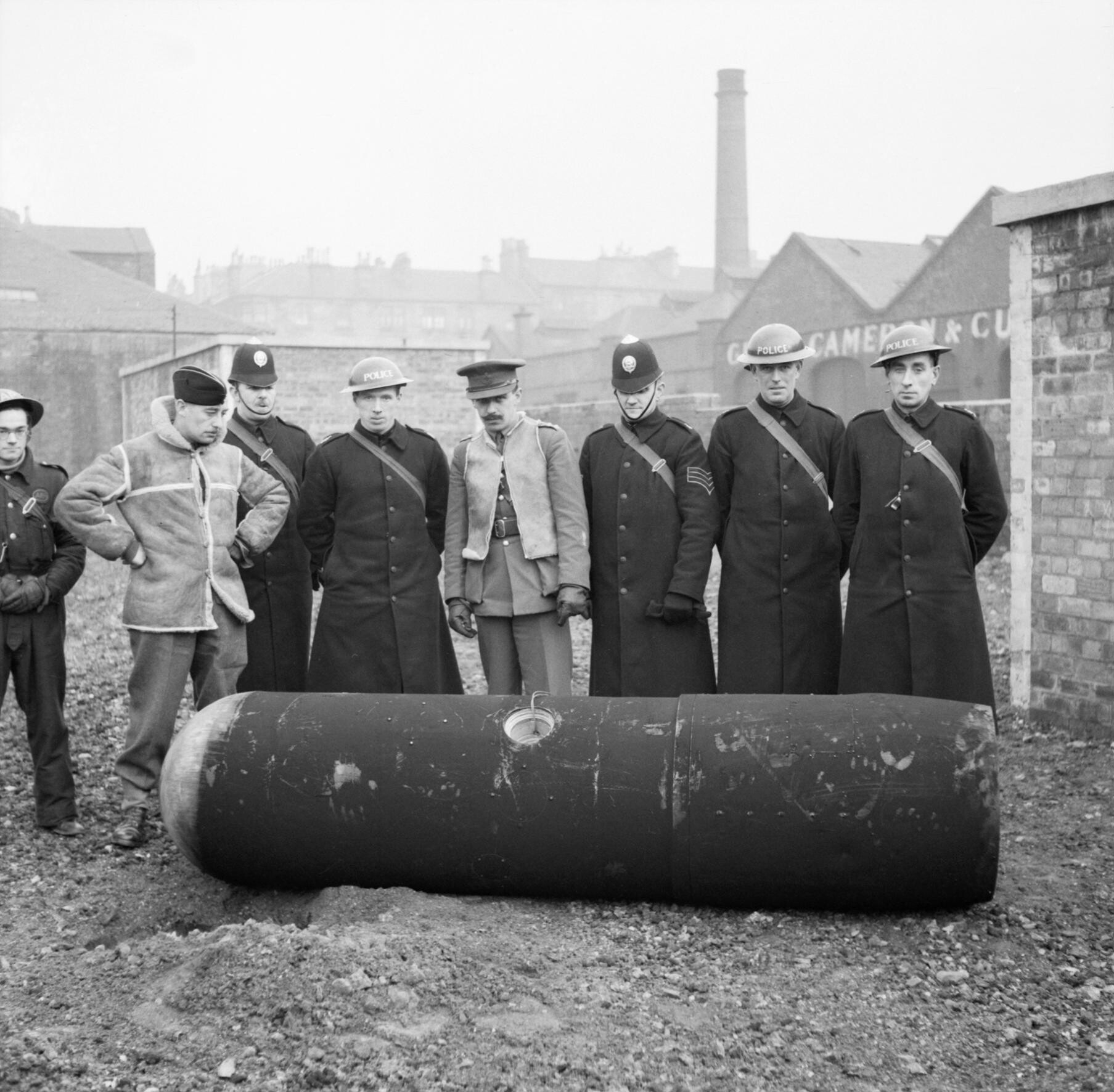
A defused German bomb in Glasgow, 2 months before the Greenock bombings.

The Greenock Blitz is the name given to two nights of intensive bombing of the town of Greenock, Scotland by the Nazi German Luftwaffe during the Second World War. The raids over the nights of the 6 and 7 May 1941 targeted the shipyards and berthed ships around the town (similar to the Clydebank Blitz the previous March). The brunt of the bombing fell on residential areas. Over the two nights, 271 people were killed, and over 10,200 were injured. From a total of 180,000 homes nearly 25,000 suffered damage and 5,000 were destroyed.

== 6 May ==
The attack began around midnight on 6 May when around 350 German bombers attacked the town. Bombs fell all over the town and surrounding area; serious damage was inflicted on East Crawford Street and Belville Street. Many civilians fled to the tunnels in the east end of the town, significantly reducing casualties the next night.

== 7 May ==
Air raid sirens at 12:15 am on 7 May marked the beginning of a second night of bombing. Initially, incendiary bombs were dropped around the perimeter of the town. The second wave primarily attacked the east end and centre of Greenock; the distillery in Ingleston Street had been set alight in the first wave, causing a large fire that served as a beacon for the rest of the bomber force. The final wave came around 2 am, dropping high-explosive bombs and parachute land mines, which caused widespread destruction.

At 3:30 am the "All Clear" sounded, but a large area of the town was in flames. The sugar refineries, distillery, and foundries were all extensively damaged; the Greenock Municipal Buildings complex was partly destroyed; and several churches were left as burnt-out shells. However, damage to the shipyards was minimal.

== Decoy site ==
An Air Ministry decoy starfish site behind Loch Thom prevented the number of casualties from being even higher. The decoy was lit on the second night of the blitz. It consisted of numerous mounds of combustible materials scattered across a wide area of the moorland to simulate a burning urban area. Scores of large bomb craters were found after an inspection of the decoy after the air raids.

== George Medal ==
Three local firemen were awarded the George Medal.
