= St John the Evangelist's Church, Greenock =

- St John the Evangelist's Church, Greenock
- 55.9548°N 4.7702°W
- OS grid reference: NS 275,766
- Location: Union Street, Greenock, Inverclyde
- Country: Scotland
- Denomination: Scottish Episcopal Church

History
- Consecrated: 28 November 1878

Architecture
- Functional status: Active
- Heritage designation: Category B
- Designated: 13 May 1971
- Architect: Paley and Austin
- Architectural type: Church
- Style: Gothic Revival
- Groundbreaking: 1877
- Completed: 1878

Administration
- Diocese: Glasgow and Galloway

Clergy
- Rector: Revd Canon Wilhelmina Nesbitt

St John the Evangelist's Church, Greenock, is located in Union Street, Greenock, Inverclyde, Scotland. It is an active Anglican church in the Scottish Episcopal Church. It is designated by Historic Environment Scotland as a Category B listed building.

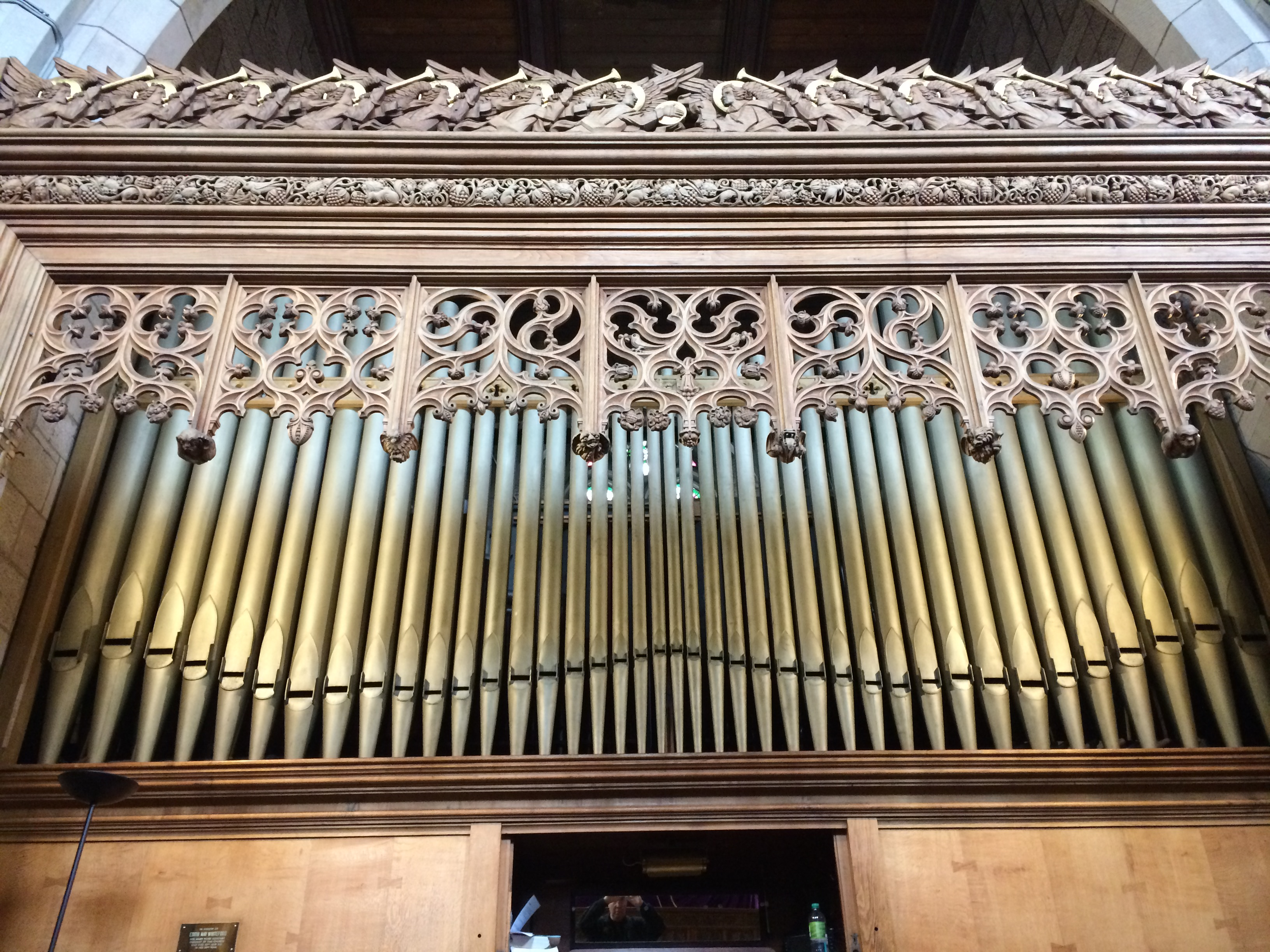
St John's Greenock: Organ by Mirrlees, carved screen

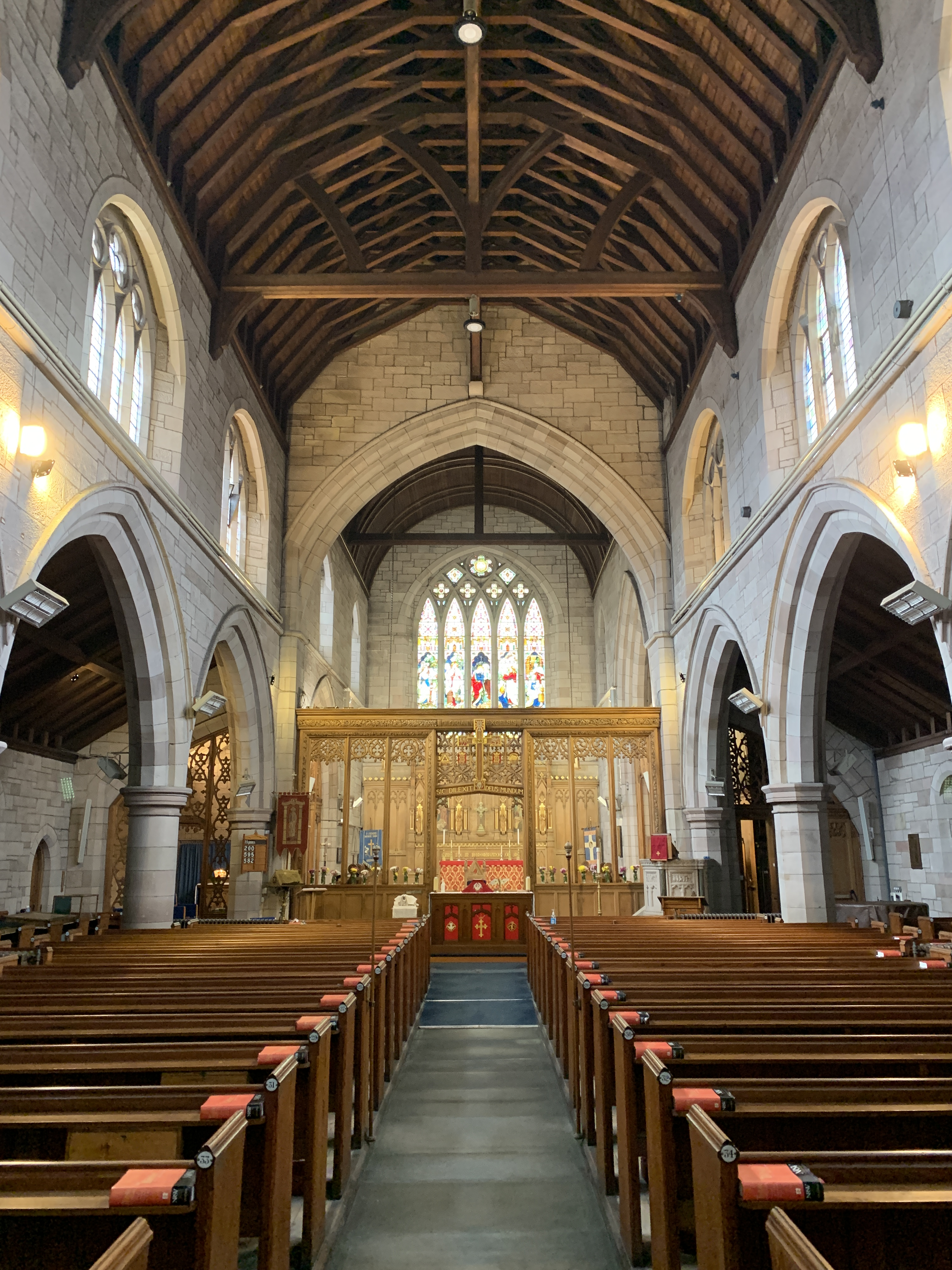
St John's Greenock: Nave and Rood screen

== History ==
The original church on the site dated from 1824, and by the 1870s it had been decided to replace it with a larger church. A competition was held for its design, but this did not result in a satisfactory outcome. The perpetual curate of the church, Revd Julius Lloyd, recommended the Lancaster architects Paley and Austin, who were given the commission to design the church. It is the only church in Scotland designed by this practice. Building started in 1877 and the church was consecrated on 28 November 1878. It cost a little over £7,000 (equivalent to £720,000 in 2025). Sir Michael Shaw-Stewart gave £1,500 towards its cost, and land to allow enlargement of the original site. In 1890 the successors in the Lancaster practice, Paley, Austin and Paley, designed stalls for the church, and in about 1897–98 the firm (then known as Austin and Paley) were asked to design an additional vestry with the original vestry used as a choir vestry to support the church's eminent choral tradition.

== Architecture ==
The architectural style is Gothic Revival. The plan of the church consists of a four-bay nave with a clerestory, a chancel with a chapel, and a tower at the southeast corner. Along the sides of the nave are three- and four-light windows. The massive square-plan tower has a slate-covered pyramidal roof, and originally sported four lucarnes. Inside the church the arcades are carried on alternate octagonal and circular piers. The heavily carved rood screen featuring a large number of animals and birds was designed by H. O. Tarbolton, and the font is a copy of a 15th-century font in Suffolk. The pipe organ, originally a house organ belonging to a Mr Robb of Glasgow in the 1850s, was built by J. and A. Mirrlees of Glasgow and substantially rebuilt by that firm in 1914.

== See also ==
- List of ecclesiastical works by Paley and Austin
- List of listed buildings in Greenock
