= George Crawfurd =

Scottish genealogist and historian

George Crawford (also Crawfurd) (1681-1748) was a Scottish genealogist and historian.

== Life ==
He was the third son of Thomas Crawfurd of Cartsburn. When Simon Fraser laid claim to the barony of Lovat, he employed Crawfurd to investigate the case and to supply materials to support it. It is said to have been chiefly due to the researches of Crawfurd that Fraser obtained a favorable decision; but he declined to pay Crawfurd anything.

He died at Glasgow, 24 December 1748.

== Works ==
Crawfurd was the author of:

- Genealogical History of the Royal and Illustrious Family of the Stewarts from the year 1034 to the year 1710; to which are added the Acts of Sederunt and Articles of Regulation relating to them; to which is prefixed a General Description of the Shire of Renfrew, Edinburgh, 1710;
- The Peerage of Scotland, containing an Historical and Genealogical Account of the Nobility of that Kingdom, Edinburgh, 1716; and
- Lives and Characters of the Crown Officers of Scotland, from the Reign of King David I to the Union of the two Kingdoms, with an Appendix of Original Papers, vol. i. 1726.

The Description of the Shire of Renfrew was published separately, with a continuation by Semple, at Paisley in 1788, and a second edition, with a continuation by Robertson, also at Paisley, 1818.

The "Letters of Simon, Lord Fraser, to George Crawfurd, 1728–30", while the Lovat case was in progress, were published in the Spottiswoode Miscellany, 400–9.

== Family ==
By his wife, Mary, daughter of James Anderson, author of ‘Diplomata Scotiæ,’ he had four daughters.
