= List of listed buildings in Greenock =

This is a list of listed buildings in the parish of Greenock in Inverclyde, Scotland.

== List ==
Name	Location	Date Listed	Grid Ref. (Note: Sometimes known as OSGB36, the grid reference (where provided) is based on the British national grid reference system used by the Ordnance Survey. • "Guide to National Grid". Ordnance Survey. • "Get-a-map". Ordnance Survey.)	Geo-coordinates	Notes	LB Number (Note: Historic Environment Scotland assign a unique alphanumeric identifier to each designated site in Scotland, for listed buildings this always begins with "LB", for example "LB12345".)	Image
Former Church Of Scotland, 25, 27 Madeira Street				55°57′24″N 4°46′44″W	Category B	34129	Upload another image
24 And 26 Margaret Street				55°57′22″N 4°46′20″W	Category B	34132	Upload Photo
County Court Buildings, Nelson Street				55°56′58″N 4°45′55″W	Category B	34133	Upload another image See more images
Lindores, 61 Newark Street				55°57′30″N 4°47′07″W	Category B	34135	Upload Photo
Sir Gabriel Wood's Mariners' Asylum, Newark Street (Including Front Wall Gate Etc)				55°57′33″N 4°47′14″W	Category A	34136	Upload another image See more images
Birnam, 88, 90 Newark Street				55°57′35″N 4°47′06″W	Category B	34140	Upload Photo
Steamboat Quay, Former Harbour Trust Offices				55°56′53″N 4°44′58″W	Category C(S)	34176	Upload Photo
Clarence Street, Tobacco Warehouse				55°57′09″N 4°45′39″W	Category B	34180	Upload Photo
2 Ardgowan Square				55°57′08″N 4°46′03″W	Category C(S)	34076	Upload Photo
9 Ardgowan Square				55°57′09″N 4°46′09″W	Category C(S)	34079	Upload Photo
23 And 24 Ardgowan Square				55°57′05″N 4°46′09″W	Category B	34082	Upload Photo
Keir Hardie House, 4 Brougham Street				55°57′13″N 4°45′54″W	Category B	34092	Upload Photo
Former Clydesdale Bank, Cathcart Square And 130, 132 And 134 Cathcart Street				55°56′50″N 4°45′20″W	Category B	34098	Upload another image See more images
Custom House, Custom House Place				55°56′53″N 4°45′04″W	Category A	34100	Upload Photo
Watt Memorial School, Dalrymple Street				55°56′52″N 4°45′19″W	Category B	34101	Upload Photo
15 Esplanade And 64 Eldon Street				55°57′34″N 4°46′29″W	Category B	34108	Upload Photo
153, 153A And 155 Finnart Street				55°57′18″N 4°46′46″W	Category B	34111	Upload Photo
Westburn Church, Nelson Street (Formerly The Old Kirk And St Lukes Church Of Scotland)				55°56′56″N 4°46′00″W	Category A	34134	Upload another image See more images
1 Shaw Place				55°56′47″N 4°45′26″W	Category B	34143	Upload Photo
2 Shaw Place				55°56′47″N 4°45′27″W	Category B	34144	Upload Photo
5 Shaw Place				55°56′47″N 4°45′30″W	Category B	34147	Upload Photo
72 Union Street/27 Fox Street				55°57′22″N 4°46′27″W	Category B	34164	Upload Photo
14 William Street				55°56′51″N 4°45′21″W	Category B	34171	Upload Photo
Harbour Light And Clock, Custom House				55°56′54″N 4°45′03″W	Category B	34182	Upload Photo
Cedars School Of Excellence, 31 Ardgowan Square (Formerly The Greenock Club)				55°57′05″N 4°46′03″W	Category B	34086	Upload Photo
44 Ardgowan Street				55°57′13″N 4°46′21″W	Category B	34089	Upload Photo
189 Eldon Street				55°57′42″N 4°47′25″W	Category C(S)	34104	Upload Photo
13, 14, 15 And 16 Seafield Cottage Lane, Seafield Cottage				55°57′33″N 4°46′26″W	Category B	34106	Upload Photo
Lindon Mansions, 48 Forsyth Street, (Former Glenpark Teachers Centre And Former Glenburn Special School)				55°57′14″N 4°46′26″W	Category B	34112	Upload Photo
Baptist Church, George Square				55°57′02″N 4°45′49″W	Category C(S)	34113	Upload Photo
Greenock Cemetery, Including Highland Mary (Mary Campbell Monument), James Watt Cairn, Cemetery Gates And Boundary Walls				55°56′50″N 4°46′17″W	Category B	34118	Upload Photo
1 South Street, Greenock Crematorium				55°56′54″N 4°46′51″W	Category C(S)	34119	Upload Photo
Municipal Buildings, Clyde Square ( Wallace Place/Dalrymple Street)				55°56′53″N 4°45′22″W	Category A	34122	Upload another image
20, 22 Margaret Street				55°57′23″N 4°46′20″W	Category B	34131	Upload Photo
Madeira Lodge 16 Newark Street				55°57′28″N 4°46′38″W	Category C(S)	34138	Upload Photo
Ardgowan Parish Church, Union Street. (Former Trinity Church Of Scotland)				55°57′12″N 4°46′13″W	Category B	34152	Upload another image
20 Union Street				55°57′06″N 4°46′00″W	Category C(S)	34157	Upload Photo
34, 36 Union Street				55°57′13″N 4°46′11″W	Category C(S)	34159	Upload Photo
64, 66 And 66A Union Street				55°57′21″N 4°46′25″W	Category B	34163	Upload Photo
Well Park: Walls And Gates				55°56′44″N 4°45′21″W	Category C(S)	34165	Upload another image See more images
49-55 West Blackhall Street And 1, 3, 5 Argyle Street				55°57′02″N 4°45′43″W	Category B	34167	Upload Photo
9 William Street				55°56′51″N 4°45′19″W	Category B	34169	Upload Photo
Former Greenock Provident Bank, 11 William Street				55°56′51″N 4°45′19″W	Category B	34170	Upload Photo
Esplanade, Cast-Iron Navigation Light				55°57′37″N 4°46′34″W	Category B	34179	Upload Photo
Ker Street, Glebe Sugar Refinery				55°57′11″N 4°45′46″W	Category B	34181	Upload another image
3, & 4 Ardgowan Square				55°57′09″N 4°46′04″W	Category C(S)	34077	Upload Photo
37 Ardgowan Street				55°57′11″N 4°46′20″W	Category B	34088	Upload Photo
2 Brougham Street And 12 Patrick Street				55°57′12″N 4°45′53″W	Category B	34091	Upload Photo
8 Brougham Street				55°57′13″N 4°45′55″W	Category B	34094	Upload Photo
Old West Kirk, Campbell Street, Including Church Hall, Boundary Walls And Railings				55°57′22″N 4°46′03″W	Category B	34095	Upload another image See more images
Wellpark Mid Kirk, Cathcart Square				55°56′50″N 4°45′23″W	Category A	34096	Upload another image See more images
Former Royal Bank, 96 Cathcart Street And Cross Shore Street				55°56′49″N 4°45′15″W	Category B	34097	Upload Photo
Old Toll House, 293 Eldon Street				55°57′31″N 4°47′54″W	Category B	34105	Upload another image See more images
Greenock West United Reformed Church, George Square (Formerly George Square Congregational Church)				55°57′02″N 4°45′52″W	Category B	34116	Upload Photo
22B, 22C And 22D Esplanade And 90 Eldon Street, Firth House, With Boundary Walls And Gatepiers				55°57′36″N 4°46′39″W	Category C(S)	50050	Upload Photo
Greenbank Institute Former Greenbank Church, Kelly Street				55°56′56″N 4°46′17″W	Category B	34126	Upload Photo
St. Mary's R.C. Church And Presbytery House, 14 Patrick Street				55°57′11″N 4°45′56″W	Category B	34142	Upload Photo
30 West Stewart Street				55°57′05″N 4°45′48″W	Category B	34168	Upload Photo
Greenock, James Watt Dock, Titan Cantilever Crane				55°56′38″N 4°43′50″W	Category A	34175	Upload another image See more images
80-92 Cathcart Street, Former Post Office Building				55°56′49″N 4°45′13″W	Category B	34183	Upload another image See more images
Tontine Hotel, 5 Ardgowan Square				55°57′10″N 4°46′05″W	Category A	34078	Upload another image See more images
19, 20 & 21 Ardgowan Square				55°57′05″N 4°46′10″W	Category C(S)	34081	Upload Photo
30 Ardgowan Square				55°57′05″N 4°46′04″W	Category C(S)	34085	Upload Photo
6 Brougham Street				55°57′13″N 4°45′54″W	Category B	34093	Upload Photo
'Bagatelle' 47 Eldon Street				55°57′31″N 4°46′31″W	Category B	34103	Upload Photo
16 Esplanade And 68 Eldon Street				55°57′34″N 4°46′30″W	Category B	34109	Upload Photo
Scott's Dry Dock With Outer Basin				55°56′40″N 4°44′40″W	Category A	50131	Upload another image
Eldon Street, Former Torpedo Works At Fort Matilda Industrial Estate				55°57′41″N 4°47′45″W	Category B	50579	Upload Photo
Former St. Columba's Gaelic Church, Grey Place And Patrick Street				55°57′12″N 4°45′51″W	Category B	34121	Upload Photo
29 Union Street				55°57′12″N 4°46′12″W	Category C(S)	34151	Upload Photo
38, 40 Union Street				55°57′14″N 4°46′12″W	Category C(S)	34160	Upload Photo
Fort Matilda Railway Station				55°57′33″N 4°47′43″W	Category B	34174	Upload another image See more images
16 Ardgowan Square And 11 Robertson Street				55°57′06″N 4°46′12″W	Category B	34080	Upload Photo
5, 7 Bank Street, Former Premises Of Renfrewshire Bank				55°56′46″N 4°45′25″W	Category B	34090	Upload Photo
Greenock Crematorium, 1 South Street, Summerhouse Tempietto (Formerly Of Caddle Hill House Now To North Of Greenock Crematorium)				55°56′55″N 4°46′37″W	Category B	34120	Upload Photo
Bellevue, 8 Johnston Street				55°57′29″N 4°46′27″W	Category B	34125	Upload Photo
21 Madeira Street				55°57′28″N 4°46′41″W	Category B	34128	Upload Photo
31 Margaret Street				55°57′20″N 4°46′19″W	Category B	34130	Upload Photo
14 Union Street				55°57′05″N 4°45′57″W	Category C(S)	34155	Upload Photo
16 Union Street				55°57′06″N 4°45′59″W	Category C(S)	34156	Upload Photo
St Patrick's Rc Church And Presbytery, Orangefield And Holmscroft Street				55°56′48″N 4°46′12″W	Category A	34173	Upload Photo
Ardgowan Estate Office, Mansion House, Ardgowan Square				55°57′08″N 4°46′02″W	Category B	34075	Upload Photo
32 Ardgowan Square				55°57′06″N 4°46′02″W	Category C(S)	34087	Upload Photo
84 Eldon Street And Madeira Lodge, 4 Madeira Street				55°57′35″N 4°46′37″W	Category C(S)	34107	Upload Photo
Inverkip Street Burial Ground				55°56′50″N 4°45′56″W	Category C(S)	34123	Upload another image See more images
98,100 Newark Street				55°57′36″N 4°47′10″W	Category B	34141	Upload Photo
3 Shaw Place				55°56′47″N 4°45′28″W	Category B	34145	Upload Photo
4 Shaw Place				55°56′47″N 4°45′29″W	Category B	34146	Upload Photo
Watt Library And Mclean Museum Union Street, Kelly Street And Watt Street				55°57′03″N 4°45′58″W	Category A	34148	Upload another image See more images
12 Union Street				55°57′05″N 4°45′57″W	Category C(S)	34154	Upload Photo
Kilmalcolm Road, St Laurence's Rc Church And Presbytery				55°56′23″N 4°44′48″W	Category A	34184	Upload Photo
26, 27 And 28 Ardgowan Square				55°57′04″N 4°46′05″W	Category B	34083	Upload Photo
34 Esplanade And 134 Eldon Street				55°57′40″N 4°46′50″W	Category B	34110	Upload Photo
5 George Square				55°57′03″N 4°45′50″W	Category C(S)	34114	Upload Photo
St. George's North Church Of Scotland, George Square				55°57′00″N 4°45′50″W	Category B	34117	Upload Photo
12 Newark Street				55°57′27″N 4°46′37″W	Category B	34137	Upload Photo
Finnart - St Paul's Church Newark Street				55°57′31″N 4°46′53″W	Category A	34139	Upload Photo
21 Union Street				55°57′10″N 4°46′09″W	Category C(S)	34149	Upload Photo
27 Union Street				55°57′11″N 4°46′11″W	Category C(S)	34150	Upload Photo
St. John The Evangelist's Episcopal Church, Union Street				55°57′04″N 4°45′55″W	Category B	34153	Upload Photo
22 Union Street/23 Patrick Street				55°57′07″N 4°46′00″W	Category C(S)	34158	Upload Photo
Convent, Little Sisters Of The Poor, Union Street (Western Block Only)				55°57′17″N 4°46′13″W	Category B	34161	Upload Photo
62 Union Street/32 Margaret Street				55°57′20″N 4°46′24″W	Category B	34162	Upload Photo
Well Park: Well				55°56′46″N 4°45′16″W	Category A	34166	Upload another image See more images
Warehouse (Clyde Port Authority) East Hamilton Street, Cartsdyke				55°56′33″N 4°43′35″W	Category A	34172	Upload another image See more images
Bearhope/Roxburgh Street, Mcewing Building Contractors				55°56′46″N 4°45′50″W	Category B	34177	Upload Photo
29 Ardgowan Square				55°57′05″N 4°46′05″W	Category C(S)	34084	Upload Photo
6 Cathcart Square, Cathcart House (Formerly The Carrick Building)				55°56′51″N 4°45′21″W	Category B	34099	Upload Photo
6 George Square				55°57′02″N 4°45′51″W	Category C(S)	34115	Upload Photo

== Key ==
The scheme for classifying buildings in Scotland is:

- Category A: "buildings of national or international importance, either architectural or historic; or fine, little-altered examples of some particular period, style or building type."
- Category B: "buildings of regional or more than local importance; or major examples of some particular period, style or building type, which may have been altered."
- Category C: "buildings of local importance; lesser examples of any period, style, or building type, as originally constructed or moderately altered; and simple traditional buildings which group well with other listed buildings."

In March 2016 there were 47,288 listed buildings in Scotland. Of these, 8% were Category A, and 50% were Category B, with the remaining 42% being Category C.

== See also ==
- List of listed buildings in Inverclyde
