= James Watt Dock Crane =

Coordinates: 55.943854°N 4.730309°W

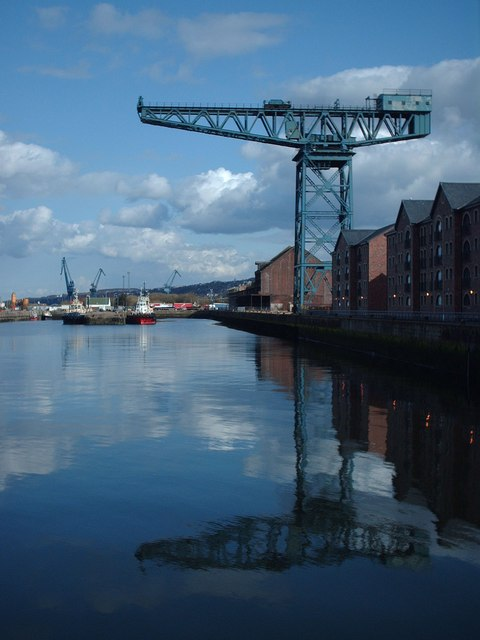
The James Watt Dock Crane

The James Watt Dock Crane is a giant cantilever crane situated at Greenock on the River Clyde.

== History ==
It was built in 1917 by Sir William Arrol & Co. It was rated to lift 150 tonnes (150 long tons; 170 short tons), and is a category A listed structure. Apart from an adjacent derelict mobile Smith Rodley, it is the only crane left in the dock after the yards were cleared for redevelopment.

The crane was used for the fitting out of ships.

== See also ==
- List of Category A listed buildings in Inverclyde
- List of listed buildings in Greenock
