= Baron of Cartsburn =

Title of nobility in the Baronage of Scotland

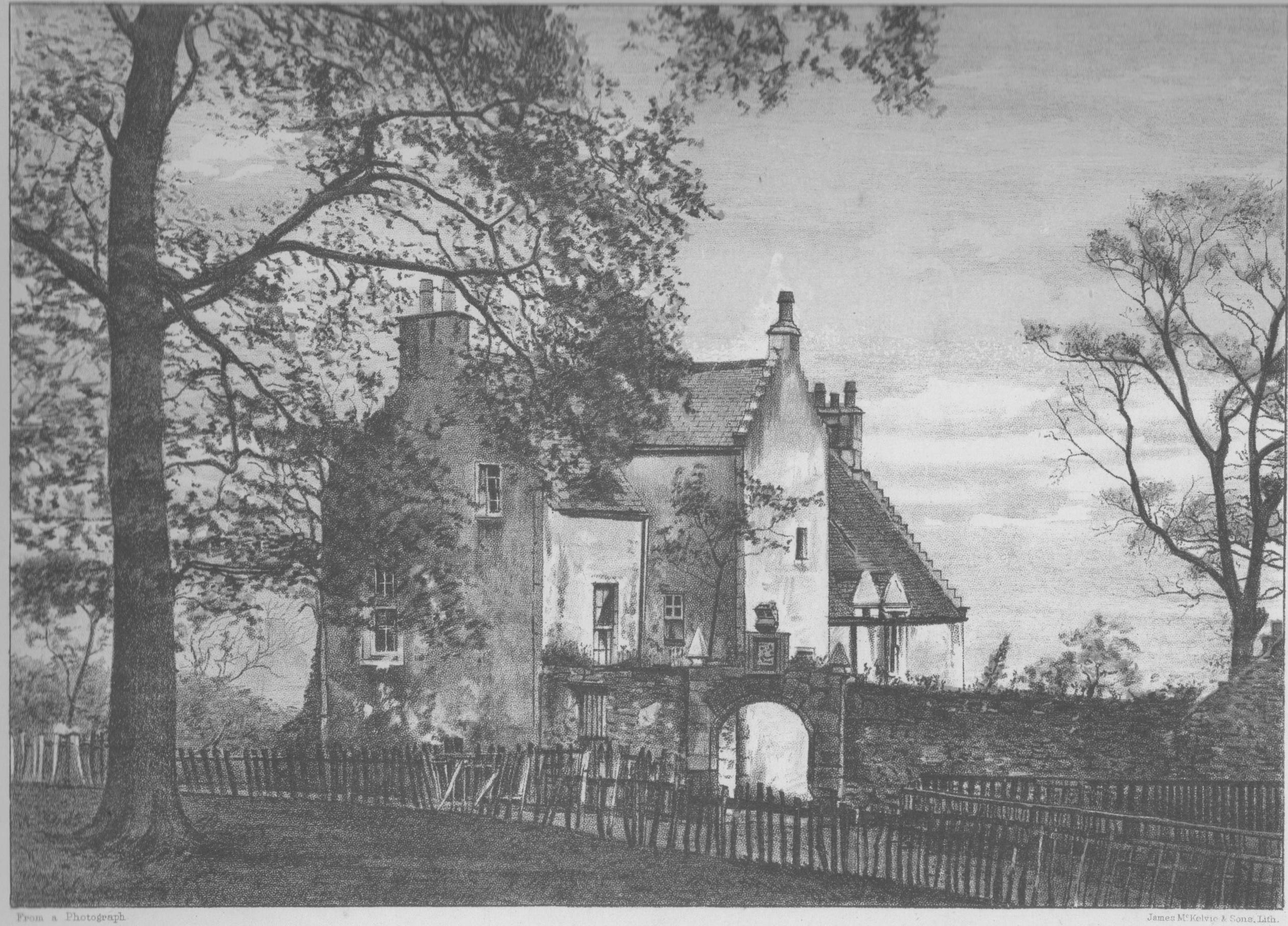
The House of Cartsburn

Baron of Cartsburn is a title of nobility in the Baronage of Scotland.

Created for Thomas Crawfurd of Cartsburn in 1669, when the lands of Cartsburn in the Parish of Easter Greenock in the Shire of Renfrew were erected in liberam baroniam, as a free barony held of the Prince and Great Steward of Scotland. The estate of Cartsburn, also known as Crawfurdsburn, incorporated the lands of Cartsdyke and part of the lands of Easter Greenock Castle. The seat of the Barony was the House of Cartsburn, built in the 17th century near Greenock, Renfrewshire.

The most notable Barons of Cartsburn are Thomas Crawfurd of Cartsburn, 4th Baron of Cartsburn, Thomas Macknight Crawfurd of Cartsburn and Lauriston Castle, 8th Baron of Cartsburn, and Mark Lindley-Highfield of Ballumbie Castle, 14th Baron of Cartsburn. The present Baron is the 15th Baron of Cartsburn. Other people associated with the Barony include George Crawfurd, the compiler of The Peerage of Scotland, the inventor James Watt, the nation's bard Robert Burns, and the poet Jean Adam.

In 2010, the dignity 'Baron of Cartsburn' was disponed by assignation to Dr. Pier Felice degli Uberti.

== History ==
The Barony of Cartsburn in the Baronage of Scotland was created for Thomas Crawfurd of Cartsburn in 1669, when the lands of Cartsburn in the Parish of Easter Greenock in the Shire of Renfrew were erected in liberam baronium, as a free Barony held of the Prince and Great Steward of Scotland. The estate of Cartsburn, also known as Crawfurdsburn, incorporated the lands of Cartsdyke and part of the lands of Easter Greenock Castle. The Barony of Cartsburn was a feudal barony, as an extant title after the 2004 abolition of feudalism in Scotland, it became a personal dignity protected by law. The seat of the Barony was the House of Cartsburn, built in the 17th century near Greenock, Renfrewshire.

Excerpts from the Baron Court Book of Cartsburn have been published, rendering it one of the few Baronies with comprehensive evidence for research into the social history of the area. George Crawfurd, the compiler of the notable and esteemed work The Peerage of Scotland, belonged to the family of Crawfurd of Cartsburn and was the brother of the second Baron. It is suspected that it was through George Crawfurd's genealogical writings that the manuscript of Sir Ewen Cameron of Lochiel's memoirs came into the possession of the Crawfurds of Cartsburn, which William Macknight Crawfurd of Ratho, the seventh Baron, then donated for publication.

Other people associated with the Barony include the inventor James Watt, the nation's bard Robert Burns, and the poet Jean Adam. The famous inventor James Watt grew up within the Barony. His father and namesake, James Watt, was contracted to enlarge the mansion house of Sir John Shaw, 2nd Baronet at Greenock, and his grandfather, Thomas Watt, was Bailie of the Barony of Cartsburn. Robert Burns was invited to stay at the estate at the invitation of the 4th Baron, Thomas Crawfurd of Cartsburn. He later mentioned the Baron in his work. Jean Adam's published poems of 1734 were dedicated to the Baron of Cartsburn.

== Notable Barons ==
Thomas Crawfurd of Cartsburn, 4th Baron of Cartsburn, invited Robert Burns to stay at his country estate at Cartsburn. Burns himself writes of Thomas Crawfurd of Cartsburn's "ingenious, friendly, and elegant epistle". In his Preface to the Memoirs of Sir Ewen Cameron of Lochiel, Chief of the Clan Cameron, James Macknight describes Thomas as "a person of superior literary attainments", who "collected a considerable library".

Thomas Macknight Crawfurd of Cartsburn and Lauriston Castle, 8th Baron of Cartsburn was credited with several ameliorations to the grounds of Lauriston Castle, a property which he acquired in 1871. He made general improvements to Lauriston, including the bringing of a number of architectural features from his estate at Cartsburn.

Mark Lindley-Highfield of Ballumbie Castle, the 14th Baron of Cartsburn, when a student and editor of The Gaudie, the newspaper of the University of Aberdeen, resigned in protest at editorial interference from the University's Students' Association. His campaign for editorial independence received the support of Orkney & Shetland MP Alistair Carmichael, Moray MP Angus Robertson, Cheltenham MP Mike Jones, Angus MP Mike Weir, and then MP for Banff and Buchan and later First Minister Alex Salmond, who signed to support an Early Day Motion in Parliament criticising the Students' Association's "ill-advised move". Lindley-Highfield received the title in 2008 before assigning it in 2010.

== Barons of Cartsburn (1669–Present) ==
The following is a list of the Barons of Cartsburn, from 1669 to the present:

- Thomas Crawfurd of Cartsburn, 1st Baron of Cartsburn (1669–1695)
- Thomas Crawfurd of Cartsburn, 2nd Baron of Cartsburn (1695–1743)
- Archibald Crawfurd of Cartsburn, 3rd Baron of Cartsburn (1743–1783)
- Thomas Crawfurd of Cartsburn, 4th Baron of Cartsburn (1783–1791)
- Christian Crawfurd of Crawfurdsburn, 5th Baroness of Cartsburn (1791–1796) (married Robert Arthur)
- Christian Crawfurd of Crawfurdsburn, 6th Baroness of Cartsburn (1796–1818) (married Thomas Macknight of Ratho)
- William Macknight Crawfurd of Ratho, 7th Baron of Cartsburn (1818–1855)
- Thomas Macknight Crawfurd of Cartsburn and Lauriston Castle, 8th Baron of Cartsburn (1856–1909)
- Marion Woddrop Dennistoun Mitchell Crawfurd of Cartsburn, 9th Baroness of Cartsburn (1909–1912) (married James Dennistoun Mitchell of Carwood)
- Lilian Parkinson or Macknight Crawfurd of Cartsburn, 10th Baroness of Cartsburn (1912–1912) (liferent)
- Robert Arthur Christie Crawfurd of Cartsburn, 11th Baron of Cartsburn (1912–1935) (with liferent to Lilian Parkinson or Macknight Crawfurd)
- Amy Christie Crawfurd of Cartsburn, 12th Baroness of Cartsburn (1935–1958) (held in trust for her sons by her husband, 1958–1974)
- Alan Howard Crawfurd Colls, 13th Baron of Cartsburn (1958–2008) (as senior heir and joint holder with his brother Richard Andrew Colls, for both of whom the Barony was held in trust 1958–1974)
- Mark Paul Lindley-Highfield of Ballumbie Castle, 14th Baron of Cartsburn (2008–2010)
- Dr. Pier Felice degli Uberti, 15th Baron of Cartsburn (2010–Present)

== See also ==
- Easter Greenock Castle
- Lauriston Castle
- Ballumbie Castle
- List of feudal baronies
