= Ballumbie =

Area of Dundee, Scotland

Coordinates: 56°29′33″N 2°54′15″W

- Location within Dundee City council area Location within Scotland
- Council area: Dundee City
- Lieutenancy area: Dundee
- Country: Scotland
- Sovereign state: United Kingdom
- Police: Scotland
- Fire: Scottish
- Ambulance: Scottish

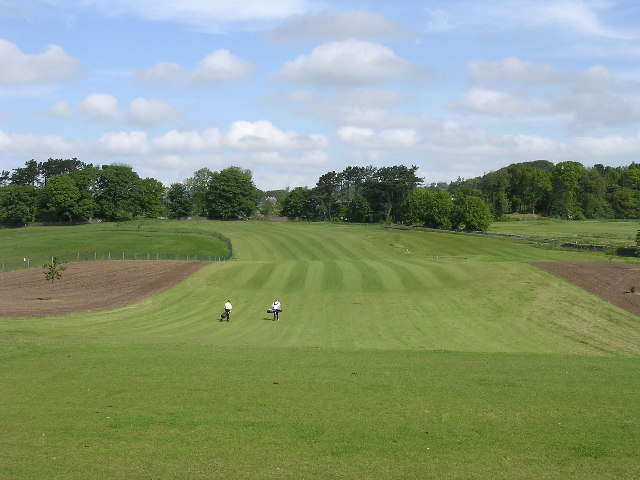
Ballumbie Golf Course

Ballumbie is a residential area on the north-east edge of Dundee, Scotland. The area was formerly an estate centred on Ballumbie Castle, a mid-16th-century fortification, which was followed by the 19th-century Ballumbie House. There is also a golf course surrounded by a medieval wall and the site of a late medieval parish church.

== Ballumbie Castle ==
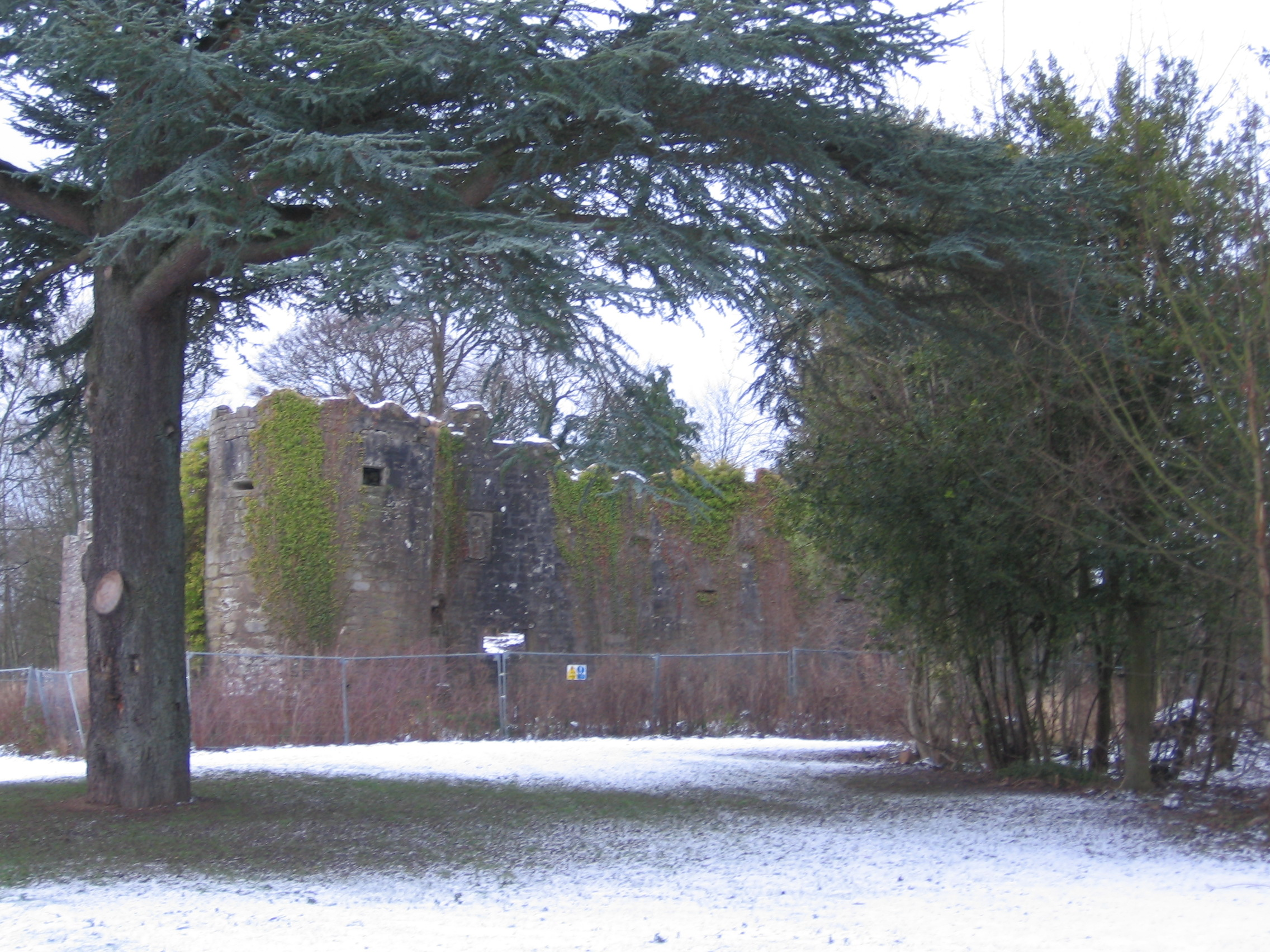
Ballumbie Castle

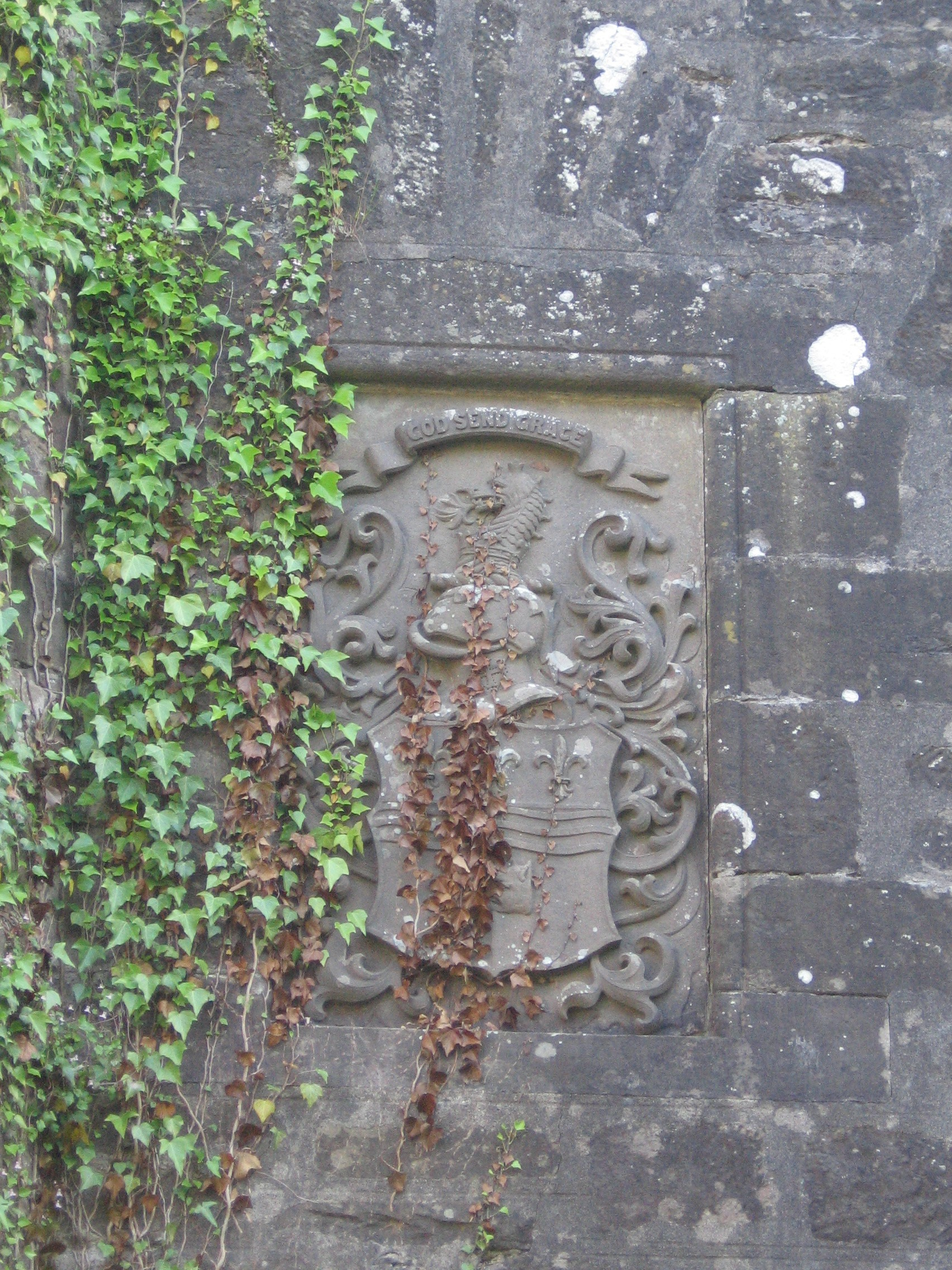
Ballumbie Castle, heraldic panel

Ballumbie Castle was built by the Lovell family.

The Royal Commission on the Ancient and Historical Monuments of Scotland record the date of construction as 1545, although Historic Scotland give a date of 14th–15th century. The castle comprised a rectangular enclosure, approximately 21 metres (69 ft) on a side, with round corner towers, overlooking the Fithie Burn.

In the early 17th century it passed to the Maule family, who became Earls of Panmure in 1646. The castle was reported as being ruined by 1682, although the remaining east and south walls were later incorporated into the stable block of Ballumbie House. Today the castle is a ruin again, in private ownership. Access is prohibited beyond the castle's security fencing for reasons of personal safety.

The lands surrounding Ballumbie Castle are known as the Ballumbie Castle Estate, and the lands of Ballumbie Castle remain the caput of this property. These are distinct from the lands of Ballumbie, which were last in the possession of Robert Williamson of Ballumbie, hence there is a Laird of Ballumbie Castle as well as a Laird of Ballumbie.

== Ballumbie House ==
In 1810, the Ballumbie House was constructed adjacent to the castle, for David Miller. It was a two-storey classical house, with an ice house and stable block, pond complete with flamingos which incorporated the remaining parts of Ballumbie Castle. By 1902, the house was the property of Alexander Gilroy, a merchant, who commissioned architect James Findlay to carry out alterations. The house was remodelled in an Arts and Crafts/Scottish Baronial style. It was converted for use as a hotel, operating from 1965 to 1981. A fire in 1982 gutted the building. After over twenty years as a roofless shell, the house was rebuilt as flats, while 230 houses were constructed in the grounds.

== Ballumbie parish church ==
First mentioned in 1470, the parish church of Ballumbie is last mentioned about a century later. Until recently its precise location remained unknown. Excavations in 2006 revealed a simple rectangular stone building measuring 14 by 4 metres (46 by 13 ft), with both internal burials and an external graveyard.

A chantry chapel or laird's aisle measuring c. 4 metres (13 ft) square was attached to the south-east side. Such chapels allowed the laird and his family to be buried away from the commoners. In the case of Ballumbie, the lairds were probably the Lovell family at this time. This family are recorded as the feudal owners of Ballumbie during the 12th century and they may have been the beneficiaries of a Norman-style plantation of new overlords by King David I. Their former castle stands about half a mile from the church, which they may have founded.

Excavations also revealed a previously unknown, Christian long cist cemetery, underlying the medieval church buildings, containing the remains of several adults and children.
