= Greenock Municipal Buildings =

Municipal building in Greenock, Scotland

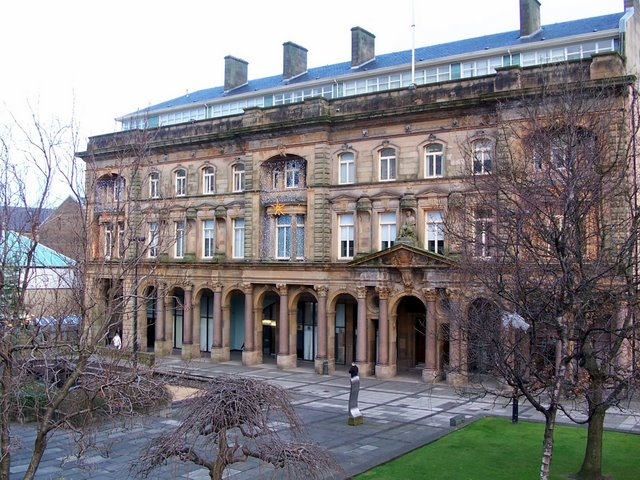
- Greenock Municipal Buildings

- Shown in Inverclyde
- 55.9479°N 4.7561°W
- Location: Clyde Square, Greenock

History
- Built: 1886

Site notes
- Architect: H & D Barclay
- Architectural style: Italianate style

Listed Building – Category A
- Official name: Municipal Buildings, Clyde Square (Wallace Place / Dalrymple Street)
- Designated: 13 May 1971
- Reference no.: LB34122

Greenock Municipal Buildings is a municipal structure in Clyde Square, Greenock, Scotland. The municipal buildings, which are the headquarters of Inverclyde Council, are Category A listed.

== History ==
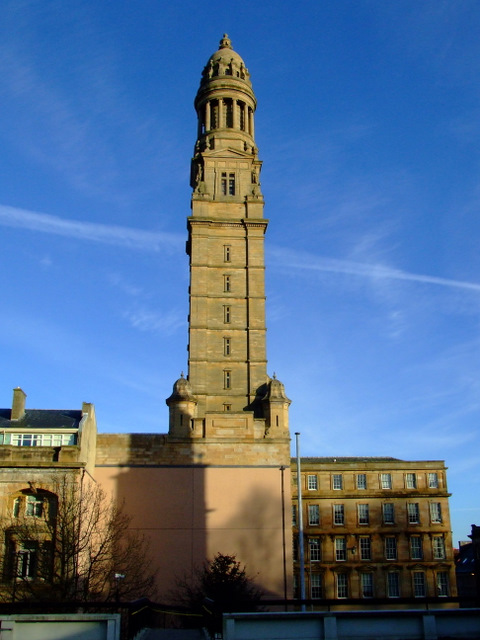
Cowan's Corner and the Victoria Tower above

The first municipal building on the site was an 18th-century town house which was built on land acquired from Lord Cathcart. The works were carried out by a local builder, James Wallace, for £240 and the building was completed in 1765. Lord Cathcart insisted that the local masonic lodge should be allowed to hold meetings in the building. The building was enlarged and remodelled in the neoclassical style at a cost of £1,700 in 1858. Now referred to as the "town hall", it faced northeast onto Dalrymple Street. An organ designed and manufactured by Forster and Andrews, with three manuals and 27 stops, was installed in the building in 1862.

Following significant population growth, largely associated with the shipbuilding industry, the burgh leaders decided in the late 1870s to procure new municipal buildings: after some debate, it was decided to acquire existing properties around the town hall, to demolish these properties and to wrap the new municipal buildings around the old town hall. The design competition, for which there were over 80 entries, was won by H & D Barclay. However, burgh leaders failed to assemble the complete site: Robert Cowan of the drapers, Cowan & Lawrie, refused to sell his shop in the southeast corner of the site and it ultimately remained in place.

The foundation stone for the new building was laid by the provost, Dugald Campbell, on 6 August 1881. It was designed in the Italianate style, built in ashlar stone at a cost of £197,061 and was completed in 1886. The design involved a broadly symmetrical main frontage with eleven bays facing southwest onto Cathcart Square, with the centre bay and the end bays slightly projected forward. The ground floor was arcaded with the openings flanked with marble Corinthian order columns; the right hand section contained a round headed doorway flanked by two pairs of columns supporting an entablature and a pediment with the burgh coat of arms in the tympanum. Above the doorway was a statue depicting commerce in a niche. There were oriel windows decorated with Ionic order columns in the centre and end bays on the first floor, and smaller windows on the second floor. The structure was dominated by the 245 feet (75 m) high structure which was named the "Victoria Tower". (Note: The Victoria Tower is 5 feet (1.5 m) higher than the tower on Glasgow City Chambers.)

The building was badly damaged in the Greenock Blitz in May 1941 during the Second World War: the tower on the northwest corner survived but a tower on the southwest corner was completely destroyed. Two pediments on the south façade were also destroyed. They were never rebuilt. Cowan's shop was also completely ruined and, after the council eventually secured ownership of the plot in the early 1950s, it was landscaped and became a garden known as "Cowan's Corner". The town hall continued to serve as the headquarters of Greenock Burgh Council for much of the 20th century and remained the local seat of government after the enlarged Inverclyde District Council was formed in 1975.

Following completion of a major programme of restoration works to the ground floor of the complex to a design by BMJ Architects, a new customer contact centre was re-opened by Queen Elizabeth II in July 2012. Repairs to the deteriorating sheriff's courtroom, which had closed in December 2009, began in July 2018 and renewal of the glazing above the carriageway that runs through the complex began in July 2020.

Works of art in the municipal buildings include a landscape painting of Gourock by John Fleming and a painting depicting a house in West Blackhall Street in Greenock by Norman Macbeth.

== See also ==
- List of Category A listed buildings in Inverclyde
- List of listed buildings in Greenock

== Sources ==
- Smith, Robert Murray (1927). The History of Greenock (PDF). Orr, Pollock & Co.
