= Easter Greenock Castle =

Castle in Inverclyde, Scotland, UK

Coordinates: 55°56′12″N 4°44′08″W

The ruins of Easter Greenock Castle at the beginning of the nineteenth century.

Easter Greenock Castle was a castle of unknown design near the burgh of Greenock, Scotland.

== History ==
=== Construction and location ===
Built sometime in the mid-sixteenth century, the castle formed the centre of the lands and estates of Cartsburn and Easter Greenock. These belonged to the Crawfords of Kilbirnie in Ayrshire who acquired them during the reign of Mary, Queen of Scots. Cartsburn extends from the Carts Burn on the west along the River Clyde to the point where the boundary falls out at Old Clyde Forge. The lands of Cartsburn were originally part of the barony of Kilbirnie and became the patrimony of a younger brother of that family, whose posterity ended in the person of David Crawford of Cartsburn in the reign of Charles I.

=== 17th century ===
By the mid- seventeenth century the lands of Cartsburn and Cartsdyke belonged to John Crawford of Kilbirnie who in 1641, because of his distinguished services to the Crown during the early years of the Wars of the Three Kingdoms (1638 to 1651), was made a baronet by Charles I. He died in 1662 and left two daughters by his second wife Magdalen, daughter of Lord Carnegie, named Anne and Margaret. Anne married Sir Archibald Stewart of Blackhall the first baronet, while Margaret became the wife of Patrick Lindsay, second son of the Earl of Crawford. The ownership of the lands was imposed upon Margaret and her male successors, who were also had to adopt the Crawfurd surname and coat of arms.

A charter of confirmation, dated 29 June 1663, in favour of Margaret Crawford of the lands and barony of Kilbirnie (granted by her father Sir John Crawford of Kilbirnie in 1662) including the 40 shilling land of the old extent of Cartsburn with buildings and fishings and free entry to and exit from the moor and marsh of Greenock, with the mill lands of Greenock in the barony of the same. Under this document Margaret and her heirs could sell and dispose of the lands of Easter Greenock and Cartsburn. In 1669, Margaret Crawford, by now Lady Kilbirnie, with the consent of her husband sold the lands of Easter Greenock to Sir John Schaw of Wester Greenock to whom was granted in 1670 a Crown Charter containing a clause by which Easter and Wester Greenock were to be united into a single barony, later called the Burgh of the Barony of Greenock. However, the disposition reserved the right to Cartsburn, which Lady Kilburnie afterwards conveyed to her cousin Thomas Crawfurd of Cartsburn, second son of Cornelius Crawford of Jordanhill, later the first Baron. The writs of the Forty-shilling lands of Cartsburn dating between 1628 and 1656, which were sold by Margaret Crawford, Lady Kilbirney, and her husband Mr Patrick Lindsay to Thomas Crawford of Cartsburn in 1678, are still extant and can be consulted in the National Archives of Scotland in Edinburgh. The place name Cartsdyke may be derived from Crawford’s Dyke, which was named after John Crawford of Easter Greenock who built a quay wall or dyke at Greenock in the middle of the sixteenth century.

Cartsburn was erected into a barony, and a burgh of barony with the privilege of a weekly market and several fairs, in favour of Thomas Crawfurd of Cartsburn, 1st Baron of Cartsburn by a charter of Charles II dated 16 July 1669. To the south of Crawfordsdyke lay the House of Cartsburn, the principal messuage of that barony and seat of the Crawfords of Cartsburn. The earliest account of Cartsburn is in Hamilton of Wishaw’s Accompt of the Sheriffdom of Renfrew published in 1710. He wrote "The town is mostly sub-feud to merchants, seamen, or loading-men, who have built very good houses in it, and it is a very thriving place".

=== Ruin and demolition ===
The Scots Magazine reported in 1809 that "the tower has... fallen, and in the course of a few years the plough will probably pass over the remains". However the Industrial Revolution, rather than the agricultural past, finally finished off the castle. The ruins, adjacent to Bridgend farm, stood in the path of the Greenock and Wemyss Bay Railway (now part of the Inverclyde Line), and were demolished by 1865. The site of the castle's location today is commemorated as Castle Road, now the only indication of Easter Greenock above ground.
