= Paisley by-election =

Paisley by-election may refer to one of five parliamentary by-elections held in the constituency of Paisley in Renfrewshire, Scotland:

- 1884 Paisley by-election
- 1891 Paisley by-election
- 1920 Paisley by-election
- 1948 Paisley by-election
- 1961 Paisley by-election

See also

- Paisley South by-election (disambiguation)
