= William Boyle Barbour =

British politician

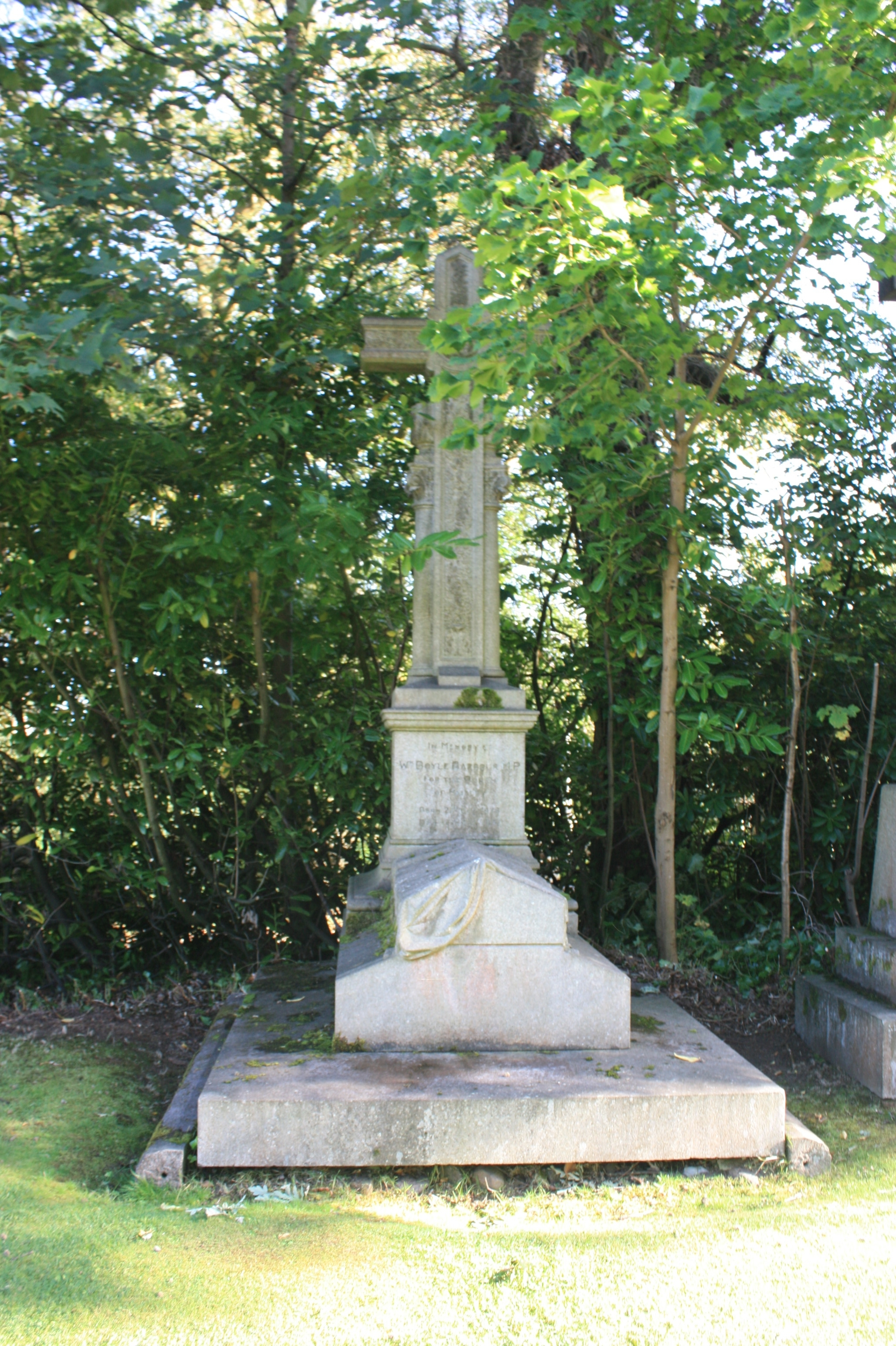
The grave of William Boyle Barbour, Woodside Cemetery, Paisley

William Boyle Barbour (22 October 1828 – 13 May 1891) was a Scottish merchant and Liberal politician.

== Career ==
Born in Paisley, the son of William Barbour a former Baillie of Paisley. He was educated privately and then entered the family business assisting his father before going to Liverpool to work for the merchants, Bell and Co. He later became head of the firm Barbour, Barclay & Co. Of Liverpool and Manchester, South American merchants and lived for a time in Brazil as well as other parts of South America. He retired from business in 1874 to concentrate on politics.

== Travel ==
Presumably in connection with what he had experienced in his travels Barbour took part in the activities of the Royal Geographical Society. And also in 1873 he was elected a member of the Royal Society of Arts.

== Politics ==
In 1884 the seat of Paisley became vacant when the sitting Liberal MP, William Holms, resigned. Barbour put his hat into the ring but stood aside in favour of a stronger candidate, Stewart Clark. Clark, a local thread manufacturer, won the by-election held in February 1884 but in Sept 1885 announced he would not be standing for Parliament again citing pressure of business commitments. Barbour again put his name forward for the Liberal nomination and, although opposed by Clark's cousin James, the local Provost, he won the selection poll on 14 Nov 1885 by 2,215 votes to Clark's 1,463. He went on to beat his Conservative opponent Major R M McKerrell at the 1885 general election by a majority of 867 votes.

Barbour was re-elected at the 1886 general election, and held the seat until his death in 1891, aged 62.

He is buried in Woodside Cemetery, Paisley, on the south side of the main east–west path at the crest of the hill, close to the crematorium.

== Memorials ==
The William Barbour Monument (designed by William Shirreffs) was erected in Paisley in 1903.

Parliament of the United Kingdom
Preceded by Stewart Clark	Member of Parliament for Paisley; 1885 – 1891	Succeeded by Sir William Dunn
