= Stewart Clark (politician) =

Scottish businessman and politician (1830 – 1907)

Stewart Clark JP DL

Member of Parliament for Paisley
- In office 15 February 1884 – 24 November 1885
- Preceded by: Humphrey Crum-Ewing
- Succeeded by: William Boyle Barbour
- Majority: 1243

Personal details
- Born: Stewart Clark; 2 January 1830
- Died: 21 November 1907 (aged 77)
- Citizenship: United Kingdom
- Party: Liberal
- Spouse: Annie Smiley
- Children: 4

Stewart Clark JP, DL (2 January 1830 – 21 November 1907) was a Scottish businessman and Liberal Party politician.

Stewart Clark was a thread manufacturing entrepreneur. In the 18th century James and Patrick Clark started a thread business which expanded to the United States in the 19th century. In 1952 the firm merged with J&P Coats forming what has since been renamed the Coats Group.

Clark was a Justice of the Peace in Linlithgow and was the Deputy Lord Lieutenant for Renfrewshire. Clark was the Member of Parliament (MP) for Paisley from 1884 to 1885.

Stewart Clark lived in Dundas Castle which he bought in 1899 and had four children including Sir John Stewart-Clark, 1st Baronet of Dundas. The title was taken after Dundas Castle and Clark's son, John, took the double-barrelled surname 'Stewart-Clark' in honour of his father.

Parliament of the United Kingdom
Preceded by William Holms	Member of Parliament for Paisley; 1885–1885	Succeeded by William Barbour
