= John McCallum (British politician) =

Scottish soap manufacturer and Liberal politician (1847-1920)

Sir John Mills McCallum

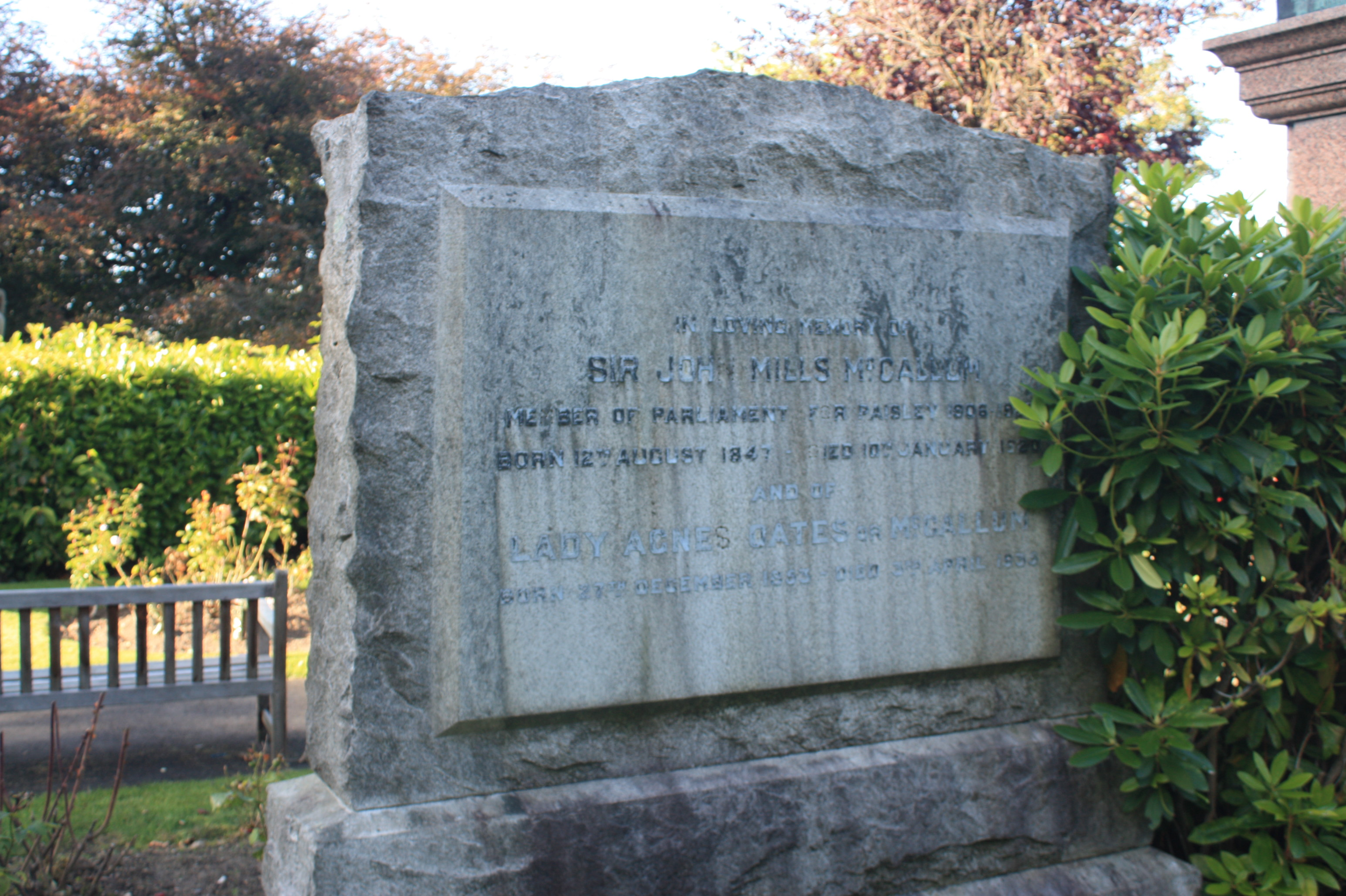
The grave of Sir John McCallum, Woodside Cemetery, Paisley

Sir John Mills McCallum (12 August 1847 – 10 January 1920) was a Scottish soap manufacturer and Liberal politician.

== Family and education ==
McCallum was born in Paisley the son of John McCallum who was originally from Kintyre and was a partner in a firm of dyers. McCallum attended Allan Glen's School in Glasgow to pursue studies in chemistry. In 1875, he married Miss Oates the daughter of a Grimsby Justice of the Peace. He lived in Paisley all his life.

== Career ==
McCallum followed his father into business and became a partner in the firm of Isdale and McCallum, soap manufacturers.

== Politics ==
=== Local politics ===
McCallum became a member of the Paisley Town Council in 1899. He was a magistrate in the town and also served as a Justice of the Peace for Renfrew.

He was sometime president of the Scottish Liberal Association and took a prominent part in the promotion of the Paisley Liberal Club, despite being a teetotaller and a temperance campaigner.

=== Political position ===
McCallum was identified as a supporter of the great Liberal prime minister William Ewart Gladstone, particularly on the issue of Irish Home Rule. He also seems to have favoured greater devolution to Scotland itself, attending meetings of the Scottish Home Rule Association. Despite being an industrialist he was in that tradition of Liberal politicians supporting radical causes. He was a supporter of the Paisley Tenants’ Protection Association (PTPA) set up in 1902 and formed to campaign against the missive system, underpinning Scottish property transactions, and against rent increases. The PTPA became a broader radical campaigning body, diversifying from just housing questions into a forum for supporting wider social change. Indeed, McCallum developed into a strong advocate of social and labour reform, very much identified with the New Liberal agenda of social legislation enacted principally after 1908.

=== Parliament ===
McCallum first stood for Parliament in Paisley at the general election of 1906, succeeding Sir William Dunn who had been Liberal MP for the town since winning a by-election in 1891. He faced Liberal Unionist opposition and a candidate from the Scottish Workers' Representation Committee for labour, but he won with a majority of 3,070 votes and 52.7% of the poll.

He held his seat at the general elections of January and December 1910 both times in straight fights against Conservative opposition – by 2,921 votes in January and 2,689 in December.

At the 1918 'coupon' general election McCallum faced a tougher fight. At first he kept his options open on support for the Coalition government. He announced to a meeting of the Paisley Liberal Association that he would vote in Parliament as a Liberal for the Coalition government. While soon being approached by a number of local Liberals and urged to fight as an official Coalitionist, he wavered and the Coalition Coupon was bestowed on his Unionist opponent, John Taylor. Taylor, a furniture maker from Glasgow, actually fought as a member of the National Democratic Party. In addition McCallum faced a Labour opponent, John M Biggar, standing as a Co-operative candidate. In a tight three-way contest McCallum held his seat by a majority of just 106 votes, polling 7,542 votes to Biggar's 7,436 and Taylor's 7,201.

== Public life ==
Apart from his political work McCallum took an active part in the public life of his home town. He was for many years president of the Paisley Young Men's Christian Association (YMCA), a member of the Philosophical Society, a director of Paisley Museum and Art Gallery and a director of the Poor Association. He was knighted in 1912

== Death ==
McCallum died at Southdene, Paisley on 10 January 1920 aged 72 years. His death caused a by-election in Paisley and presented the opportunity for former Liberal Party leader H. H. Asquith to return to the House of Commons.

He is buried in Woodside Cemetery in Paisley, on the main east–west path leading from the crematorium on the crest of the hill. The grave is immediately west of Joseph Whitehead's stunning Pieta, "Mother and Son".

Parliament of the United Kingdom
Preceded by Sir William Dunn	Member of Parliament for Paisley; 1906–1920	Succeeded by H. H. Asquith
