= Seven Pillars Institute =

Think Tank based in Kansas, US

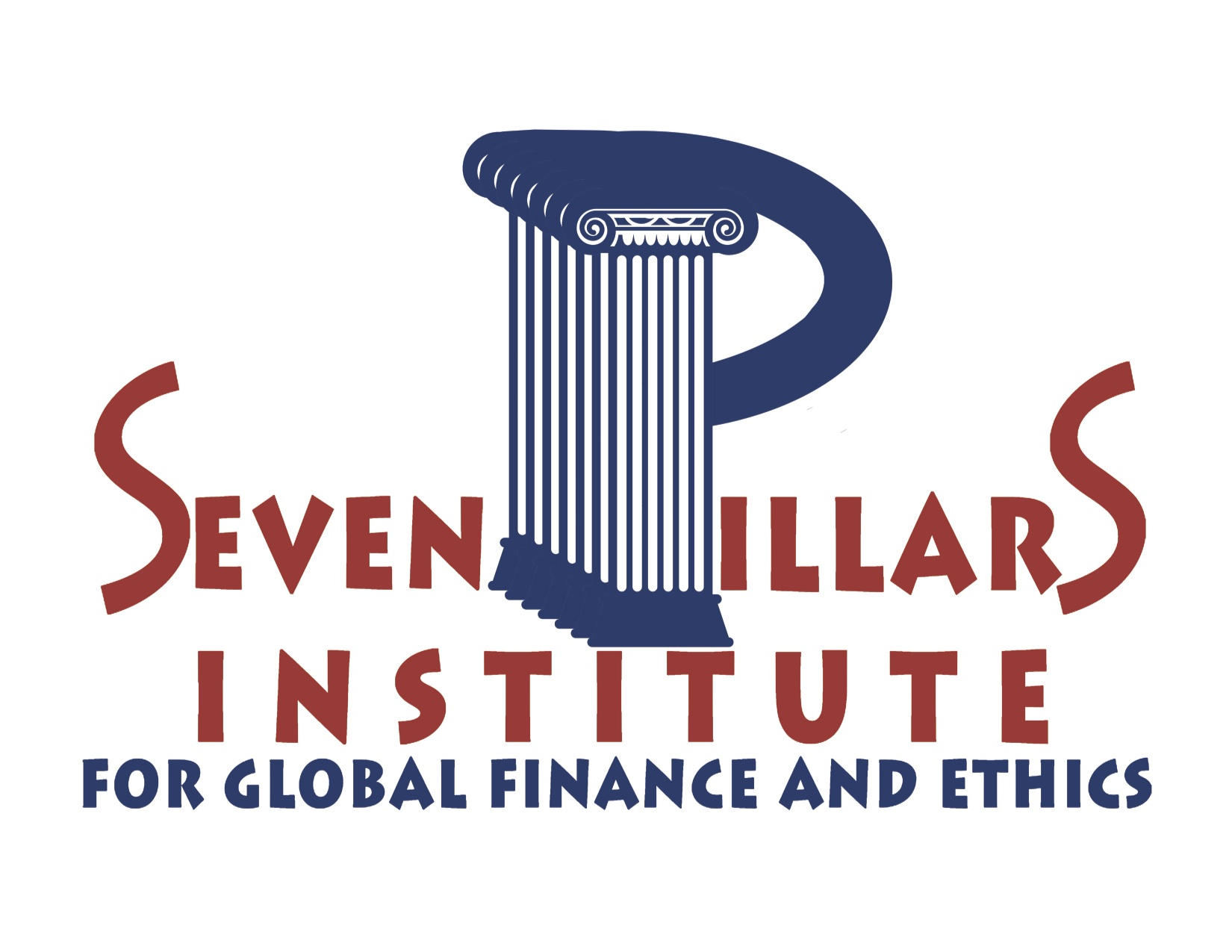
- Established: 2010; 16 years ago
- Founder: Kara Tan Bhala
- Type: Non-profit think tank 501(c)(3)
- Purpose: To highlight and analyze issues of moral philosophy in global financial markets with a view to enhancing ethical practice and policy
- Headquarters: Seven Pillars Institute, 31 W 31st St., Kansas City, Missouri 64108 United States
- Location: Kansas City, Missouri, United States
- Coordinates: 39.0709°N 94.5868°W
- President: Kara Tan Bhala
- Website: sevenpillarsinstitute.org

Seven Pillars Institute for Global Finance and Ethics (SPI) is a not-for-profit think tank based in Kansas City, Missouri. Founded in 2010 by Kara Tan Bhala, the institute is authorized under Section 501(c)(3) of the United States Internal Revenue Code and is a nonsectarian and nonpartisan research and educational organization. A large part of the institute's work is to provide education on ethics and its application in every area of finance.

== History ==
Dr. Kara Tan Bhala founded Seven Pillars Institute in Lawrence, Kansas, in 2010. The institute is the first think tank in the world to focus on financial ethics.

Dr. Tan Bhala serves as president of the institute. She has an MBA from Oxford University and PhD in philosophy from the University of Kansas. She was previously a lecturer in finance at the University of Kansas, a visiting research fellow (2015 to 2017) and currently an honorary research fellow at the Centre for Commercial Law Studies (CCLS) at the School of Law of Queen Mary University of London.

Dr. Tan Bhala has also worked for twenty-three years in international finance, mostly on Wall Street, and nine as a managing director at Merrill Lynch. Dr. Tan Bhala has published extensively and has lived and worked in London, Oxford, Singapore, Hong Kong, New York City, and Washington, D.C.

== Work ==
Seven Pillars states its financial ethics services, primarily education-oriented, are geared towards the sectors of:

- government - working with governmental agencies and departments to incorporate ethical considerations into policy-making and provide ethics seminar and consulting
- business - provide employees with ethical perspectives to decision-making and enlighten employers to ethical issues with the institute's industry case studies
- academia - contribute to the proliferation of research, articles, and learning tools pertaining to ethics and finance

The institute has embarked on a number of collaborative efforts with other organizations and institutions.

One such collaboration is with the Centre for Commercial Law Studies at Queen Mary University of London where they work on ethics, law, and regulation in finance. The collaboration aim is to foster a dialogue on important ethical policy issues affecting the financial services industry. This dialogue is to be achieved primarily through Dr. Costanza Russo's designing of a postgraduate module in 'Ethics in Business and in Finance', and a comprehensive framework that includes collaboration on research, publications and other educational endeavors. Dr. Tan Bhala also works closely with the Transparency Task Force, an advocacy group based in London, England, whose purpose is to increase transparency in financial services.

The institute has also conducted interviews with prominent economists, professors and authors. Among them are Joris Luyendijk, L. Randall Wray, David Vines and Richard H. Thaler.

In addition to the direct work of the institute, its president and founder, Dr. Tan Bhala, has delivered numerous lectures and speeches around the world on topics related to the synthesis of ethics and finance, promoting the institute's mission and quest. Among some are:

- Ethics in Finance: A New Financial Theory for a Post-Financialized World at Oxford University
- Global Financial Ethics in the Age of Trump at the University of Auckland
- Ethics and Transparency at the Transparency Symposium at Mercer Consulting
- Finance and Ethics Panel at the Global Business Ethics Symposium at Bentley University

== Publications ==
The primary publication of the institute is its biannual journal, Moral Cents: The Journal of Ethics in Finance, which is the first journal of its kind to focus on financial ethics and attempts to follow the institute's mission.

The institute also publishes a variety of ancillary resources to aid in its mission, including:

- an online dictionary/glossary of ethical and financial terms
- an online library of Financial Ethics Case Studies (FECS) - case studies in financial ethics from around the world, including some regarding Universal Basic Income
- a collection of introductory articles on ethics under the rubric of "Ethics 101"

Real Clear Markets has featured a number of articles published by the institute and its associates in their research reports:

- Financing, Ethics and the 2016 Brazil Olympics
- The Case of Goldman Sachs and 1MDB
- Are Insider Trading and the GM Bailout Ethical?

The institute is also currently in the middle of developing a financial ethics training video series titled, Ethics in Finance is Good!. The series is intended to have twelve episodes, each about two to three minutes long, and each dedicated to a specific topic in financial ethics. The videos are largely in animated form and are an attempt to provide a more light-hearted, entertaining and punchy type of ethics training video as opposed to the supposed corporate run-of-the-mill videos. As of January 2021, there are seven episodes.
