= Kingsway Theatre =

Kingsway Theatre, and variations may refer to companies, or cinemas, or auditorium, or theaters, or theatres:

== Companies ==
- Kingsway Cinema Ltd., founded by James Welsh (Paisley MP)

== Cinemas ==
=== Australia ===
- Kingsway Theatre, opened 3 May 1929 as Sutherland Theatre, later Odeon Sutherland, 4 Boyle Lane, Sutherland, New South Wales, (Closed)

=== Canada ===
- Kingsway Theatre, 3030 Bloor Street West, Etobicoke, Toronto: List of cinemas in Toronto
- Kingsway Theatre, Vancouver, Canada. now: Jesus Is Lord Church Worldwide
- Kingsway Drive-In Theatre, Montague, Prince Edward Island

=== England ===
- Kingsway Theatre, Kings Heath, Birmingham, opened 2 March 1925, later, Essoldo Bingo Club, later, Gala Bingo Club. see: Kings Heath§Sport and leisure
- Kingsway Kinema, 93 Two Mile Hill Road, Kingswood, South Gloucestershire, (Bristol), built in 1926, opened in 1927, demolished in 2009
- Kingsway Super Cinema, 197 London Road, Hadleigh, Essex, opened 27 April 1936 by Associated British Cinemas, closed in 1970 and demolished
- Kingsway Picture House, Hoylake, opened on 10 July 1915, closed 12 March 1960 and demolished
- Kingsway Cinema, 36 Parliament Street, Lancaster, opened on 3rd April 1923, Independent, in 1923, bought by Union Cinemas, October 1937, bought by Associated British Cinemas, Closed in 1939
- Kingsway Cinema, Harrogate Road, Moortown, Leeds, opened 28 June 1937, closed 23 August 1958
- Kingsway Super Cinema, 266 Moseley Road, Levenshulme, Manchester, opened 14 March 1929 by Snape and Ward, bought by Union Cinemas, 24 February 1936, bought by Associated British Cinemas October 1937, fire damage 26 June 1957, demolished in 1970s.
- Kingsway Cinema, 109 High Street, Newmarket, Suffolk, opened 31 December 1926, closed on 28 May 1977, became Coronet Social Club, later the Grand Ole Opry, former house of Catherine Grey, Dowager Countess of Stamford and Warrington from second marriage of George Grey, 7th Earl of Stamford
- The Novelty Theatre, a 1882 London theatre
  - renamed the Great Queen Street Theatre from 1900 to 1907
  - renamed the Kingsway Theatre from 1907 to 1941, accessed from the new-in-1905 Kingsway Road

=== Scotland ===
- Kingsway Cinema, corner of King Street and Frederick Street, Aberdeen, opened 1 March 1939, now a Buzz Bingo Club
- Kingsway Cinema, owned by James Welsh (Paisley MP), opened on 8 May 1929, by Kingsway Cinema Ltd., later Vogue Cinema, Cathcart, Glasgow, Scotland (demolished)
- Kingsway Cinema & Leisure Centre, opened around 1920 as The Playhouse Cinema, Market Street, Galashiels, Scotland, now a 4-screen cinema
- Kingsway Theatre, now, Kino Cinema, Glenrothes. see: Glenrothes§Retail and service sectors

=== United States ===
- Kingsway Theatre, 946 Kings Highway, Brooklyn, NY (Closed): Midwood, Brooklyn§Movie theaters
- Kingsway Cinema, 258 West Kings Highway, Eden, North Carolina
