= Paisley North (UK Parliament constituency) =

UK Parliament constituency (1983–2005)

- Former burgh constituency for the House of Commons
- Boundary of Paisley North in Scotland for the 2001 general election

1983–2005
- Seats: one
- Created from: Paisley, West Renfrewshire and East Renfrewshire
- Replaced by: Paisley and Renfrewshire North and Paisley and Renfrewshire South

Paisley North was a parliamentary constituency centred on the town of Paisley in Renfrewshire, Scotland. It returned one Member of Parliament (MP) to the House of Commons of the Parliament of the United Kingdom, elected by the first past the post system.

== History ==
The constituency was created when the former Paisley constituency was divided for the 1983 general election. It was abolished for the 2005 general election, when Paisley was represented by the new constituencies of Paisley & Renfrewshire South and Paisley & Renfrewshire North.

== Boundaries ==
1983–1997: The Renfrew District electoral divisions of Paisley Abercorn, Paisley Craigielea, and Renfrew.

1997–2005: The Renfrewshire electoral divisions of Linwood and Paisley North, Paisley Abercorn, and Renfrew.

== Members of Parliament ==
| Election | Member | Party |
|---|---|---|
| 1983 | Allen Adams | Labour |
| 1990 by-election | Irene Adams | Labour |
| 2005 | constituency abolished: see Paisley & Renfrewshire South and Paisley & Renfrewshire North | |

== Election results ==
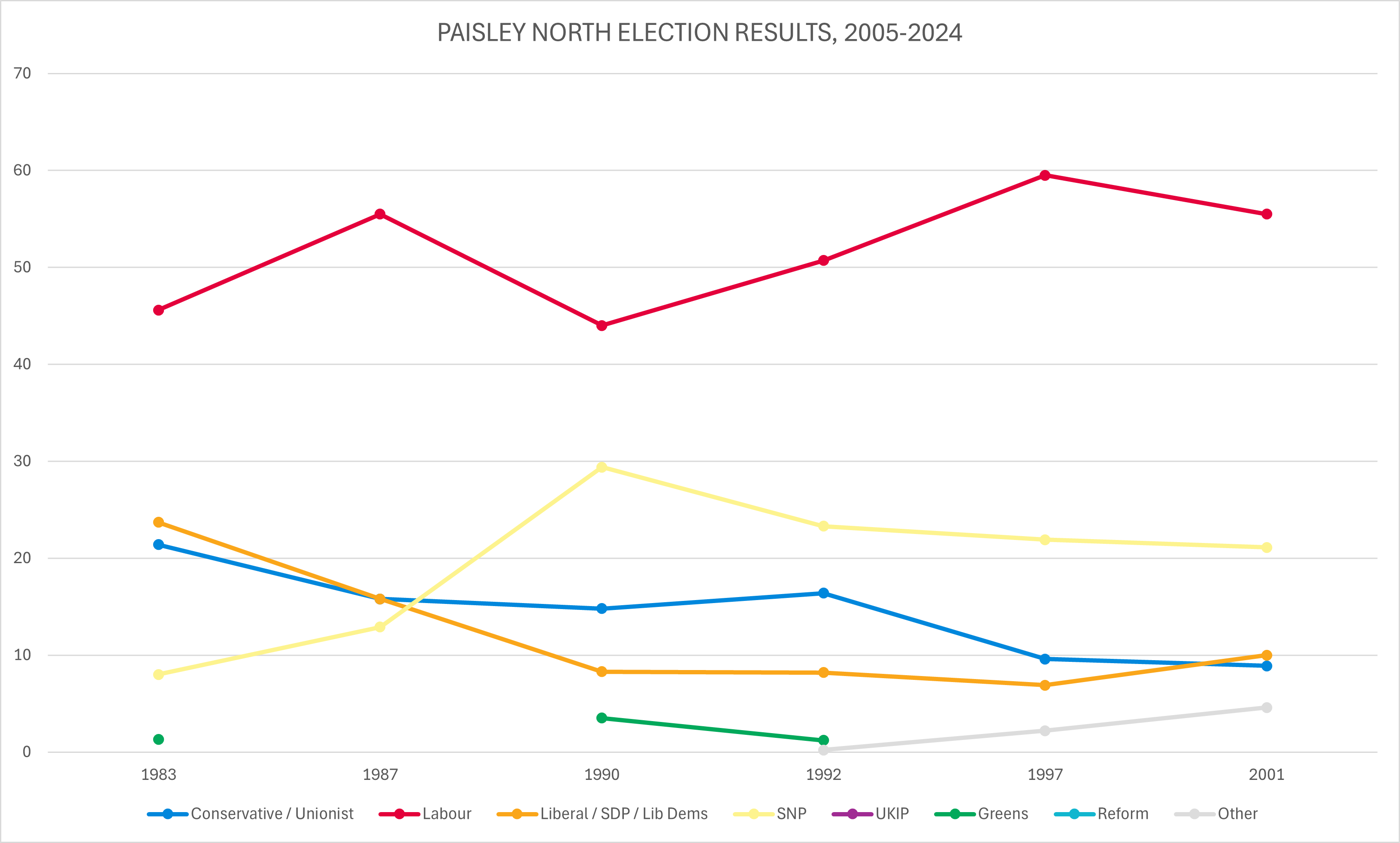
Election results 1983-2001

=== Elections of the 1980s ===
General election 1983: Paisley North
| Party | Candidate | Votes | % | ±% |
|---|---|---|---|---|
| Labour | Allen Adams | 15,782 | 45.6 | −12.4 |
| SDP | Eileen McCartin | 8,195 | 23.7 | |
| Conservative | Brian Townsend | 7,425 | 21.4 | −8.1 |
| SNP | Hugh Morell | 2,783 | 8.0 | −3.0 |
| Ecology | Nicolette Carlaw | 439 | 1.3 | New |
| Majority | | 7,587 | 21.9 | |
| Turnout | | 34,624 | 68.6 | |
| Labour win (new seat) | | | | |

General election 1987: Paisley North
| Party | Candidate | Votes | % | ±% |
|---|---|---|---|---|
| Labour | Allen Adams | 20,193 | 55.5 | +9.9 |
| Conservative | Eleanor Laing | 5,751 | 15.8 | −5.6 |
| SDP | Eileen McCartin | 5,741 | 15.8 | −7.9 |
| SNP | Ian Taylor | 4,696 | 12.9 | +4.9 |
| Majority | | 14,442 | 39.7 | +17.8 |
| Turnout | | 36,381 | 73.5 | +4.9 |
| Labour hold | | Swing | | |

=== Elections of the 1990s ===
By-Election 1990: Paisley North
| Party | Candidate | Votes | % | ±% |
|---|---|---|---|---|
| Labour | Irene Adams | 11,353 | 44.0 | −11.5 |
| SNP | Roger Mullin | 7,583 | 29.4 | +16.5 |
| Conservative | Ewan Marwick | 3,835 | 14.8 | −1.0 |
| Liberal Democrats | Jim Bannerman | 2,139 | 8.3 | −7.5 |
| Green | David Mellor | 918 | 3.5 | New |
| Majority | | 3,770 | 14.6 | −24.9 |
| Turnout | | 25,828 | 53.7 | −19.8 |
| Labour hold | | Swing | −11.8 | |

General election 1992: Paisley North
| Party | Candidate | Votes | % | ±% |
|---|---|---|---|---|
| Labour | Irene Adams | 17,269 | 50.7 | −4.8 |
| SNP | Roger Mullin | 7,940 | 23.3 | +10.4 |
| Conservative | David Sharpe | 5,576 | 16.4 | +0.6 |
| Liberal Democrats | Eileen McCartin | 2,779 | 8.2 | −7.6 |
| Green | David Mellor | 412 | 1.2 | New |
| Natural Law | Nicholas Brennan | 81 | 0.2 | New |
| Majority | | 9,329 | 27.4 | −12.3 |
| Turnout | | 34,057 | 73.4 | −0.1 |
| Labour hold | | Swing | | |

General election 1997: Paisley North
| Party | Candidate | Votes | % | ±% |
|---|---|---|---|---|
| Labour | Irene Adams | 20,295 | 59.5 | +7.6 |
| SNP | Ian Mackay | 7,481 | 21.9 | −1.6 |
| Conservative | Kenneth Brookes | 3,267 | 9.6 | −6.1 |
| Liberal Democrats | Alan Jelfs | 2,365 | 6.9 | −0.8 |
| ProLife Alliance | Robert Graham | 531 | 1.6 | New |
| Referendum | Edwin Mathew | 196 | 0.6 | New |
| Majority | | 12,814 | 37.5 | +10.1 |
| Turnout | | 34,135 | 68.6 | −4.8 |
| Labour hold | | Swing | | |

=== Elections of the 2000s ===
General election 2001: Paisley North
| Party | Candidate | Votes | % | ±% |
|---|---|---|---|---|
| Labour | Irene Adams | 15,058 | 55.5 | −4.0 |
| SNP | George Adam | 5,737 | 21.1 | −0.8 |
| Liberal Democrats | Jane Hook | 2,709 | 10.0 | +3.1 |
| Conservative | Craig Stevenson | 2,404 | 8.9 | −0.7 |
| Scottish Socialist | Jim Halfpenny | 982 | 3.6 | New |
| ProLife Alliance | Robert Graham | 263 | 1.0 | −0.6 |
| Majority | | 9,321 | 34.4 | −3.1 |
| Turnout | | 27,153 | 56.6 | −12.0 |
| Labour hold | | Swing | | |
