= Roger Mullin =

Scottish politician (born 1948)

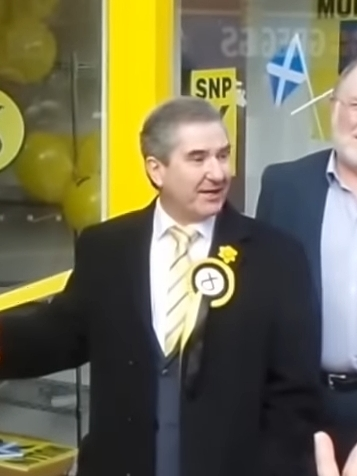
- Mullin in 2015

Member of Parliament for Kirkcaldy and Cowdenbeath
- In office 7 May 2015 – 3 May 2017
- Preceded by: Gordon Brown
- Succeeded by: Lesley Laird

Personal details
- Born: 12 March 1948 (age 78)
- Party: Scottish National Party
- Spouse: Barbara Mullin
- Education: University of Edinburgh

William Arthur Roger Mullin (born 12 March 1948) is a former Scottish National Party (SNP) politician. He was the Member of Parliament (MP) for Kirkcaldy and Cowdenbeath from May 2015, until being defeated at the 2017 snap general election.

== Education and career ==
Roger Mullin graduated from the University of Edinburgh with a M.A. Honours degree in Sociology in 1977. He was a Member of the Institute of Personnel and Development and also holds a Higher National Certificate in Electrical and Electronic Engineering.

He is an Honorary Professor at the University of Stirling, and prior to becoming a member of parliament, lectured postgraduates on Applied Decision Theory, The Political Environment, and Organisation Change. Since 2020 he has been involved in supporting the MSc in Human Rights and Diplomacy.

== Political career ==
Mullin joined the SNP in 1966. He is a former Vice-convener of the Scottish National Party.

He was the SNP candidate at the Paisley North by-election in 1990, where he finished in second place behind Irene Adams of the Labour Party, with 29.4% of the vote. He also finished in second place at the 1992 general election in the same seat, with a reduced share of 23.3% of the vote. He unsuccessfully fought three earlier Westminster campaigns at the February 1974 general election in South Ayrshire, again in South Ayrshire at the October 1974 general election and at Kirkcaldy in 1987. His wife, Barbara Mullin, was also a candidate for the SNP at the 1992 general election in the Ayr constituency. However, neither he nor his wife were elected.

In the 1999 Scottish Parliament election, he contested the Ayr constituency but came in third place.

In January 2015, Mullin was selected as the official SNP candidate for the Kirkcaldy and Cowdenbeath constituency and subsequently was elected on 7 May 2015 with 27,628 votes and a 52.2% share of the vote. Mullin had a majority of 9,974 votes over Kenny Selbie, the Labour Party candidate who was hoping to succeed former UK Prime Minister Gordon Brown, who retired after 32 years as an MP from what had once been Labour's safest seat in Scotland. Kirkcaldy and Cowdenbeath saw a turnout of 69.73%; the highest recorded for this constituency.

As a Member of Parliament, Mullin was a Treasury Spokesperson for the SNP, and a member of the Regulatory Reform Select Committee He led a campaign in Westminster to reform Scottish Limited Partnerships which had been exposed by the Herald newspaper in Scotland as being vehicles for tax evasion and laundering of criminal assets. Since leaving Parliament, he has continued to comment and campaign on Scottish Limited Partnerships, including being critical of the Law Society of Scotland's lack of effective action. Mullin presented a ten-minute rule bill to parliament on 20 April 2016 entitled Forensic Linguistic (standards) Bill. He also presented a Private Members Bill on Double Taxation Treaties for developing countries). On 13 October 2015 Mullin led a Westminster Hall debate on the subject of The Use of Children as Suicide Bombers spelling out the significant rise on the use of children and young girls as human guided weapons.

Mullin was Chair of the All-Party Parliamentary Group (APPG) for Explosive Weapons, in which capacity he addressed the 19th International Meeting of Mine Action National Programme Directors and United Nations Advisers at the United Nations in Geneva 2016. He led a Westminster Foundation for Democracy project in Iraqi Kurdistan, and while in Iraq, became the first British MP to enter the City of Mosul during hostilities to see at first hand work being undertaken to begin to clear the city of improvised explosive devices.

In 2016, he was appointed to the SNP's Sustainable Growth Commission.

After leaving the House of Commons, Mullin was appointed Special Envoy for the All-Party Parliamentary Group (APPG) on Explosive Threats in July 2017. He subsequently became a founding director of REVIVE Campaign which advocates for victims of explosive threats and acts as the secretariat of the APPG.

As a result of his continued anti-corruption work, Mullin became a member of the Transparency Task Force's Advisory Group in 2020. He subsequently became a founding director of REVIVE Campaign which advocates for victims of explosive threats

He was a founding director of Momentous Change Ltd. during which time he undertook research into Brexit and Scottish Business and initial research into a stock exchange for Scotland along with former SNP MP Michelle Thomson.

In November 2020, Mullin was elected for one year onto the SNP National Executive Committee.

In 2022, Mullin raised a petition with the Scottish Parliament to review the law regarding abusive lawsuits known as Strategic Lawsuits Against Public Participation (SLAPPS). It successfully passed all stages of the Parliament's petition committee scrutiny and the Scottish Government subsequently acted, launching a formal consultation in 2025.

In 2023, 2024 and 2025, Mullin organised academic events for the Adam Smith Global Foundation in celebration of the continuing significance of the work of Adam Smith.

== Publications ==
- Adam Smith: The Kirkcaldy Papers. Adam Smith Global Foundation. November 2023 (Editor and contributor)
- Putin's Invasion of Ukraine: The Psychological Impact. REVIVE Campaign. January 2023 (Editor and contributor)
- Scottish Business and International Trade – Perceptions of the Scottish Business Diaspora, Momentous Change Ltd, January 2020
- Organization Development: How Organisations Change and Develop Effectively (Red Globe Press), London, 2020 (contributing author)
- Trust in UK Banking. International Banker. September 2019.
- A Stock Exchange for Scotland: Early background research, Momentous Change Ltd, November 2018.
- Facing the Brexit Challenge. iScot Magazine, May 2018.
- The Changing Face of Suicide Bombing. Cable, Issue 2, August 2017
- Public and Third Sector Leadership (Emerald Publishing), London, 2014 (contributing author)
- Mhairi's Dilemma: A study of decision analysis at work. Judgment and Decision Making, Vol. 3, No. 8, December 2008, pp. 679–689
- Career Goals and Educational Attainment: What is the Link?. Careers Scotland, 2004
- An Evaluation of the Higher Still Reforms. Insight, No. 11, The Scottish Executive, 2003
- Lifelong Learning: A Radical First Step. Holyrood, Issue 68, April 2002
- The Role of FE in Economic Development, Broadcast no.42, SFEU, 1998
- Good Judgment. Policing, vol ii, no. 4, Winter 1995, pp. 272–281
- The Competence Debate. Training and Development. London, 1993.
- Decisions and Judgments in NVQ based assessment (NCVQ, London, 1992)
- A Programme for Opportunity. London: Manpower Services Commission, 1983
- The Unemployment State. In The Bulletin of Scottish Politics. Edinburgh, 1981
- Edinburgh's Silence. In J. Bochel, D.Denver, A. Macartney (Eds), The Referendum Experience, Scotland 1979. Aberdeen University Press, 1981.
- The Sound of Devolution. In J. Bochel, D.Denver, A. Macartney (Eds), The Referendum Experience, Scotland 1979. Aberdeen University Press, 1981.
- The Scottish National Party. In H. Drucker (ed), Multi-Party Britain. London and New York: Macmillan, 1979.

Parliament of the United Kingdom
Preceded by Gordon Brown	Member of Parliament for Kirkcaldy and Cowdenbeath; 2015–2017	Succeeded by Lesley Laird
