= Allen Adams =

British politician

Member of Parliament for Paisley North Paisley (1979–83)
- In office 3 May 1979 – 5 September 1990
- Preceded by: John Robertson
- Succeeded by: Irene Adams

Personal details
- Born: 16 February 1946 Glasgow, Scotland
- Died: 5 September 1990 (aged 44)
- Party: Labour
- Spouse: Irene Adams (m. 1968)

Allender Steele Adams (16 February 1946 – 5 September 1990), known as Allen Adams, was a Scottish Labour politician who served as the Member of Parliament (MP) for Paisley from 1979 to 1983 and Paisley North from 1983 to 1990. Adams was born in Glasgow, and married Irene Adams on 24 February 1968.

He was elected as a Member of Strathclyde Regional Council for Paisley Craigielea in 1974, a position he held until standing down due to his election as the MP for Paisley.

He served as Labour's Scottish whip whilst an MP. In a notable speech on 31 March 1988, he described Margaret Thatcher in the House of Commons as having "behaved towards Scotland with all the sensitivity of a sex-starved boa constrictor", a remark immediately withdrawn, as is the custom in the Commons.

== Death ==
Adams died on 5 September 1990 at the age of 44 from a brain hemorrhage. In the by-election that followed his death, his widow Irene Adams, succeeded him as MP for Paisley North.

Parliament of the United Kingdom
Preceded by John Robertson	Member of Parliament for Paisley; 1979–1983	Constituency abolished
New constituency	Member of Parliament for Paisley North; 1983–1990	Succeeded by Irene Adams
