= James McKissack =

Scottish architect (1875–1940)

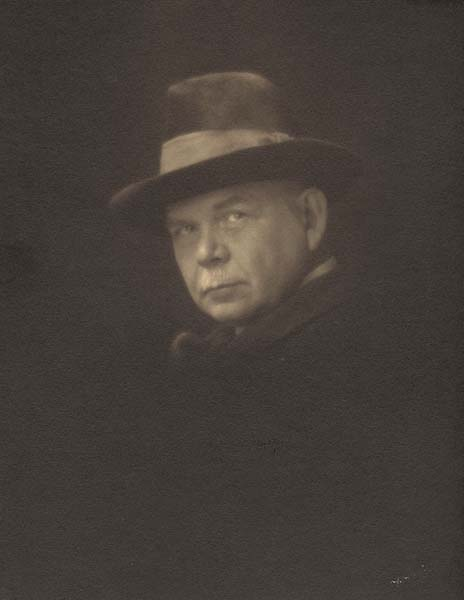
- Born: James McKissack; 31 May 1875; Glasgow, Scotland
- Died: 24 June 1940 (aged 65)
- Education: Glasgow School of Art, Glasgow and West of Scotland Technical College
- Known for: Architecture, Photography
- Notable work: Glasgow Film Theatre, Vogue Cinema Possilpark
- Style: Art Deco
- Spouse: Isabella Somerville

James McKissack (31 May 1875 – 24 June 1940) was a prominent Scottish architect known for his innovative designs, particularly in cinema architecture during the early 20th century.

== Education ==
Glasgow born James McKissack was the son of John McKissack of the Glasgow practice McKissack & Rowan and his first wife Helen Ronald. He was educated at Allan Glen's School. He initially worked with his father, John McKissack, in the family firm McKissack & Rowan. After the firm dissolved in 1890, James completed his apprenticeship under his father and he remained with his father as an assistant until he was taken into partnership in 1900 and the practice became John McKissack & Son. He also studied at the Glasgow School of Art (GSA) from 1890 to 1894, where he refined his skills. The following year McKissack attended the Glasgow and West of Scotland Technical College to study Architectural and Building Construction under Professor Gomlay A.R.I.B.A. His education and early work with his father set the foundation for his later successes as an architect, particularly in cinema design, continuing his father's practice after his death in 1915.

== Career ==
James McKissack was a leading Scottish cinema architect during the 1930s, creating buildings that captured the essence of the Art Deco era. Known for his work with clients like George Singleton and Harry Winocour, McKissack designed cinemas such as the Cosmo Glasgow Film Theatre and the Mecca Vogue Cinema Possilpark, blending modernist ideas with decorative details. His designs emphasised functional layouts, prominent entrances, and stylized interiors. Though many of his works were later converted or demolished, McKissack's career left a significant mark on Scotland's architectural and cinematic history.

In 1907, McKissack became a member of the Glasgow Institute of Architects, and in 1911, he was admitted as a Licentiate of the Royal Institute of British Architects (LRIBA).

Beyond his architectural career, McKissack had a strong passion for photography and was an active member of the Glasgow and West of Scotland Photographic Federation. His photographs were featured in Cancer of Empire (1924), a book on the slums of Glasgow by William Bolitho Ryall, published by G.P. Putnam.

== Personal life ==
McKissack married Isabella Somerville, daughter of the lithographic artist Thomas Somerville, at Burlington House on Glasgow on 30 October 1928. She died before 1938, and McKissack died of heart failure on 24 June 1940.

== Notable cinemas designed by McKissack ==
1910s

- Eglinton Electreum Picture House, 25 Eglinton Street: Opened December 1911 (demolished)
- The La Scala (now Waterstones bookshop), 153-157 Sauchiehall St: Opened October 1912
- The Picture House (now Shorty's Social Club), 83 High Street, Cowdenbeath: Completed in 1919

1920s

- The La Scala Cinema (later Vogue Cinema and Social Club), Keith Street, Hamilton: Opened in 1921
- The Kingsway, 1235 Cathcart Road: Opened May 1929 (demolished)

1930s

- Broadway / Odeon, 19 Amulree Street: Opened 25 June 1930 (demolished)
- Commodore / Odeon, 1297 Dumbarton Road: Opened January 1933 (demolished)
- Mecca (later Vogue Cinema Possilpark), 124 Balmore Road: Opened August 1933
- The New Tivoli (now Destiny Church), 52 Gorgie Rd: Opened January 1934
- Vogue / Odeon (now Beijing Banquet), 56, 58 and 60 Main Street, Rutherglen: Opened January 1936
- Vogue / Odeon, 146 Strathmartine Road: Opened August 1936 (demolished)
- Embassy / George, Portland Street: Built in 1936 (demolished)
- Vogue, 251 Langlands Road / Crossloan Road: Opened 4 July 1938 (demolished)
- Riddrie / Vogue (now Vogue Bingo), 726 Cumbernauld Road, Riddrie: Opened March 1938
- Glasgow Film Theatre / Cosmo, 12 Rose Street, City Centre: Opened May 1939

== See also ==
- James Welsh (Paisley MP)
- Glasgow School of Art
