= Archibald Hastie (MP) =

Member of Parliament for Paisley
- In office 17 March 1836 – 9 November 1857
- Preceded by: Alexander Graham Speirs
- Succeeded by: Humphrey Crum-Ewing

Personal details
- Born: 1791
- Died: 9 November 1857 (aged 65–66)
- Party: Radical

Archibald Hastie (1791 – 9 November 1857) was a British Radical politician.

Buchan was elected Radical MP for Paisley at a by-election in 1836—caused by the resignation of Alexander Graham Speirs—and held the seat until his death in 1857.

Parliament of the United Kingdom
Preceded by Alexander Graham Speirs	Member of Parliament for Paisley; 1836–1857	Succeeded by Humphrey Crum-Ewing
