= Sir William Dunn, 1st Baronet, of Lakenheath =

British politician

Sir William Dunn MP JP FRGS
- Sir William Dunn in 1909

Member of Parliament of the United Kingdom
- In office 1891–1906
- Preceded by: William Barbour
- Succeeded by: Constituency reorganised
- Constituency: Paisley, Scotland

Consul General of the Orange Free State in the United Kingdom
- In office 1895–1900
- Succeeded by: Office abolished

Personal details
- Born: 22 September 1833 Paisley, Scotland
- Died: 31 March 1912 (aged 78) London, England
- Party: Liberal Party
- Spouse: Sarah Elizabeth Dunn
- Occupation: merchant, banker, politician

Sir William Dunn, 1st Baronet (22 September 1833 – 31 March 1912), was a London banker, merchant and philanthropist, Liberal Member of Parliament for Paisley (1891–1906), and from before 1896 until the outbreak of the Second Boer War in 1899 consul general for the Orange Free State in the United Kingdom.

== Biography ==
=== Family ===
Lady Elizabeth Dunn (1830–1919), 1909

Dunn's family origins were modest. He was born in Paisley near Glasgow on 22 September 1833 to John Dunn, a local shopkeeper, and Isabella Chalmers.

Dunn married in South Africa in 1859 with Sarah Elizabeth Howse (1 May 1830 – 2 February 1919), daughter of James Howse (1796–1852), of Grahamstown, Cape Colony, and Sarah Ann Dold (1803–1881). James Howse emigrated to Algoa Bay, South Africa from Oxfordshire in 1820. He started off as a labourer, but later owned the farm "Leeuwfontein". He was killed in an ambush on the way to his farm on New Year's Day 1852.

=== Education and training ===
It is suggested that Dunn received his earliest education at home, although there are also indications that he attended school in the working-class West End District of Paisley. At the age of fourteen Dunn became an apprentice at a local accountant's office. Since his elder brothers – William was the youngest – all went to work in spinning and weaving, it seems reasonable to surmise that Dunn, through his intelligence and education, was able to break free from his social environment.

=== Career ===
Dunn emigrated to South Africa in 1852, supported by a friend of his father's, local Member of Parliament William Barbour. where he landed in Algoa Bay. He entered the firm of Mackie & Co. of Port Elizabeth. After two years, still only twenty-one years old, he was offered a partnership in the firm. Another six years later, in 1860, Dunn succeeded his deceased partner as sole proprietor of the business.

Over time, Dunn built up a large worldwide trading empire from his South African base. Later he returned to Great Britain and controlled his businesses from London. Dunn was senior partner in the firms of William Dunn & Co. of Broad Street Avenue, London EC; Mackie, Dunn, & Co. of Port Elizabeth; W. Dunn & Co. of Durban; and in Dunn & Co. of East London. He was also a director of the Royal Exchange Assurance Co. and of the Union Discount Co. and chairman of the Home and Foreign Insurance Co.

== Political career ==
William Dunn circa 1895

After his return to Britain he settled in London, where he entered public service, as alderman for Cheap Ward in the City of London and from 1891 until the dissolution in 1906 as Liberal member of parliament for Paisley. He was also the consul general of the Orange Free State until the outbreak of the Second Boer War. Dunn was also active as chairman of the South African section of the London Chamber of Commerce and member of the Executive Council of that institution.

Dunn was created a baronet in 1895, becoming Sir William Dunn of Lakenheath, after his residence in the country. While in London he lived at 34 Phillimore Gardens, Kensington and alternatively at "The Retreat", Lakenheath, Suffolk. Both he and his wife were buried at West Norwood Cemetery. On his death in 1912, Sir William's estate was valued at 1.3 million pounds. The baronetcy became extinct upon his death.

== Legacy ==
Despite his noble gestures in death, described below, Dunn's background and business dealings are shady. During his lifetime and after he received a bad press. He was called "pathologically mean" and "a social climber who married for money". It was rumoured that he sold liquor to the African population in the Eastern Cape. Once in Parliament he allegedly did everything in his power to further his own agenda. And with his will something was amiss as well. His wife contested it and won. On the other hand, there is little evidence to substantiate the accusations and rumours.

=== Philanthropy ===
Dunn had no natural heirs and left his fortune to charity. In his will, dated 4 November 1908, Dunn prescribed that his inheritance had to be made available for the advancement of Christianity and the benefit of children and young people, for the support of hospitals, as well as "to alleviate human suffering, to encourage education and promote emigration". Dunn allotted about half his capital himself and created the Dunn Chair of New Testament Theology at Westminster College, Cambridge. The settlement of the rest of his inheritance he left to his trustees.

After handing out a large number of small grants to hospitals, nursing homes, orphanages, etc., the trustees decided on a grander scheme. In co-operation with Sir William Bate Hardy, secretary of the Royal Society and Sir Walter Morley Fletcher, the secretary of the Medical Research Committee, they decided to fund research in biochemistry and pathology. To this end, they funded Professor Sir Frederick Gowland Hopkins (1861–1947) in Cambridge with a sum of £210,000 in 1920 for the advancement of his work in biochemistry. Two years later, they endowed Professor Georges Dreyer (1873–1934) of the University of Oxford with a sum of £100,000 for research in pathology.

The money is said to have enabled each of the recipients to establish a chair and teaching and research laboratories, the Sir William Dunn Institute of Biochemistry at Cambridge and the Sir William Dunn School of Pathology at Oxford. Between them, the two establishments have yielded ten Nobel Prize winners, including Hopkins, for the discovery of vitamins, and professors Howard Florey and Ernst Chain (Oxford), for their developmental work on penicillin.

The Dunn Trustees also endowed the Dunn Nutritional Laboratory at Cambridge, which opened in 1927.

Dunn himself made more earthly gifts, like the donation – to his birthplace Paisley in 1894 – of a square, "to be kept for the enjoyment of all the inhabitants", which was named "Dunn Square".

Parliament of the United Kingdom
Preceded by William Boyle Barbour	Member of Parliament for Paisley; 1891 – 1906	Succeeded by John McCallum
Baronetage of the United Kingdom
New creation	Baronet (of Lakenheath); 1895–1912	Extinct
Preceded by Brunner baronets	Dunn baronets of Lakenheath; 29 July 1895	Succeeded by Bell baronets
