= William Holms (politician) =

Scottish businessman and politician

Member of the House of Commons
- In office 1874–1884
- Monarch: Victoria
- Preceded by: Humphrey Crum-Ewing
- Succeeded by: Stewart Clark
- Constituency: Paisley

Personal details
- Born: 5 February 1827 Paisley, Scotland
- Died: 8 October 1903 (aged 76)

William Holms (5 February 1827 – 8 October 1903) was a Scottish businessman and Liberal politician who sat in the House of Commons from 1874 to 1884.

Holms was the son of James Holms of Sancel Bank, Paisley and his wife Janet Love, daughter of James Love of Paisley. He was educated at Paisley Grammar School and Glasgow University and was partner in a textile company with factories in Glasgow and London. He was a J.P. for Lanarkshire and Lieutenant Colonel of the 1st Lanarkshire Artillery.

At the 1874 general election Holms was elected Member of Parliament for Paisley. He held the seat until 1884 when he resigned.

Holms married Mary Lindsay McArthur Buchanan daughter of John Buchanan of Glasgow in 1857. His brother John Holms was MP for Hackney.

Parliament of the United Kingdom
Preceded by Humphrey Crum-Ewing	Member of Parliament for Paisley; 1874 – 1884	Succeeded by Stewart Clark
