= John Robertson (Paisley MP) =

British politician

John Robertson (3 February 1913 – 16 May 1987) was a British politician, who sat as a Labour Member of Parliament before co-founding the Scottish Labour Party (SLP) in 1976.

== Career ==
Robertson was a toolmaker and engineer and was assistant divisional organiser of the Amalgamated Engineering Union from 1954 to 1961 and secretary of the Scottish Iron and Steel Trades Joint Committee. Joining the Labour Party in 1943, he served as a councillor on Lanarkshire County Council and Motherwell and Wishaw Council from 1946.

At the 1951 general election Robertson stood as the Labour candidate in the marginal Conservative-held seat of Glasgow Scotstoun, losing by 625 votes. He was elected to the House of Commons ten years later at the 1961 by-election in the Paisley constituency, following the appointment of sitting MP Douglas Johnston as a judge in the Court of Session. He was re-elected at five subsequent general elections.

On 18 January 1976 Robertson, along with another Labour MP, Jim Sillars and Labour's senior Scottish researcher, Alex Neil, officially established the Scottish Labour Party (SLP). The SLP emerged as a left-wing split from the mainstream Labour Party over distrust about how strong the then Labour government's stated commitment to Scottish devolution was in reality. Robertson was a leading figure in the SLP, along with Sillars, but unlike Sillars he stood down at the 1979 general election, deciding not to contest his Paisley seat. The Scottish Labour Party was officially disbanded in 1981, after failing to win any seats at the 1979 general election.

Parliament of the United Kingdom
Preceded by Douglas Johnston	Member of Parliament for Paisley; 1961–1979	Succeeded by Allen Adams
