= Alexander Graham Speirs =

Scottish member of the United Kingdom Parliament, 1835-1836 (died 1847)

Alexander Graham Spiers

Member of Parliament for Paisley
- In office 6 January 1835 – 16 March 1836
- Preceded by: Daniel Sandford
- Succeeded by: Archibald Hastie

Personal details
- Died: 24 December 1847
- Party: Whig

Alexander Graham Spiers (15 June 1797 – 24 December 1847) was a Scottish MP in the Parliament of the United Kingdom for the Scottish constituency of Paisley.

== Biography ==
Spiers was born the second son of Peter Spiers of Culcreuch.

Alexander Spiers is described in a Who's Who of Scottish MPs as an advocate, perhaps starting from 8 July 1820. The History of Parliament Online states his formative occupation to have been an army officer.

He was elected MP for Paisley in the January 1835 United Kingdom general election, standing in the Whig interest, but resigned by applying to be steward of the Chiltern Hundreds, effective 17 March 1836. Hansard records no contributions to debates from Spiers.

Spiers died on 24 December 1847.

Parliament of Great Britain
Preceded by Daniel Sandford	Member of Parliament for Paisley; 1835–1836	Succeeded by Archibald Hastie
