= Paisley South by-election =

Paisley South by-election may refer to one of two parliamentary by-elections held in the constituency of Paisley South in Renfrewshire, Scotland:

- 1990 Paisley South by-election
- 1997 Paisley South by-election

See also

- Paisley by-election (disambiguation)
