= 1990 Paisley North by-election =

UK parliamentary by-election

- 29 November 1990

Constituency of Paisley North
- Turnout: 53.7% ▼19.8%
| | First party | Second party |
|---|---|---|
| Candidate | Irene Adams | Roger Mullin |
| Party | Labour | SNP |
| Popular vote | 11,353 | 7,583 |
| Percentage | 44.0% | 29.4% |
| Swing | ▼11.5% | ▲16.5% |
| | Third party | Fourth party |
| Candidate | Ewan Marwick | Jim Bannerman |
| Party | Conservative | Liberal Democrats |
| Popular vote | 3,835 | 2,139 |
| Percentage | 14.8% | 8.3% |
| Swing | ▼1.0% | ▼7.5% |
MP before election
Allen Adams
Labour
Subsequent MP
Irene Adams
Labour

The 1990 Paisley North by-election was a parliamentary by-election held on 29 November 1990 for the UK House of Commons constituency of Paisley North, in the town of Paisley, Scotland.

It was caused by the death of the sitting Member of Parliament for the constituency, Allen Adams. The Scottish National Party saw a healthy increase in their share of the vote, but not enough to win, and the Labour Party retained the seat, with Adams' widow Irene being elected.

== Result ==
Paisley North by-election, 1990
| Party | Candidate | Votes | % | ±% |
|---|---|---|---|---|
| Labour | Irene Adams | 11,353 | 44.0 | −11.5 |
| SNP | Roger Mullin | 7,583 | 29.4 | +16.5 |
| Conservative | Ewan Marwick | 3,835 | 14.8 | −1.0 |
| Liberal Democrats | Jim Bannerman | 2,139 | 8.3 | −7.5 |
| Green | David G. Mellor | 918 | 3.6 | New |
| Majority | | 3,770 | 14.6 | −24.9 |
| Turnout | | 25,828 | 53.7 | −19.8 |
| Labour hold | | Swing | -11.8 | |

== See also ==
- Elections in Scotland
- List of United Kingdom by-elections
