= Paisley (UK Parliament constituency) =

Parliamentary constituency in the United Kingdom, 1832–1983

- Former burgh constituency for the House of Commons
- Major settlements: Paisley

1832–1983
- Seats: One
- Created from: Renfrewshire
- Replaced by: Paisley North; Paisley South

Paisley was a parliamentary constituency represented in the House of Commons of the Parliament of the United Kingdom from 1832 until 1983, when it was divided into Paisley North and Paisley South. These two constituencies were in turn amalgamated into Paisley and Renfrewshire South and Paisley and Renfrewshire North in 2005.

== Boundaries ==
The constituency covered the burgh of Paisley.

The boundaries of the constituency, as set out in the Representation of the People (Scotland) Act 1832, were-

"From the Summit of Byres Hill, on the North-east of the Town, in a straight Line to the Point near Knock Hill at which the Renfrew Road is joined by a Road from Glasgow; thence in a straight Line to the Summit of Knock Hill; thence in a straight Line to the Northern Gable of the Moss Toll House on the Greenock Road; thence in a straight Line in the Direction of the Chimney of Linwood Cotton Mill to the Point at which such straight Line cuts the Candren Burn; thence up the Candren Burn to the Point at which the same is joined by the Braidiland Burn at the Bridge over the same on the Johnstone Road; thence up the Braidiland Burn to a Point which is distant Five hundred Yards (measured along the Braidiland Burn) above the said Bridge; thence in a straight Line to Meikleridge Bridge over the Candren Burn; thence in a straight Line to the Point at which the old Neilston Road leaves the new Neilston Road; thence in a straight Line to the Summit of Dykebar Hill; thence in a straight Line to a Point which is One hundred Yards due North-east of the Summit of Bathgo Hill; thence in a straight Line to the Point first described."

== Members of Parliament ==
Election	Member	Party
1832	Sir John Maxwell	Whig
1834 by-election	Sir Daniel Sandford	Whig
1835	Alexander Speirs	Whig
1836 by-election	Archibald Hastie	Radical
1857 by-election	Humphrey Crum-Ewing	Whig
1859	Humphrey Crum-Ewing	Liberal
1874	William Holms	Liberal
1884 by-election	Stewart Clark	Liberal
1885	William Barbour	Liberal
1891 by-election	Sir William Dunn	Liberal
1906	Sir John McCallum	Liberal
1920 by-election	H. H. Asquith	Liberal
1924	Edward Mitchell	Labour
1929	James Welsh	Labour
1931	Joseph Maclay	Liberal
1945	Oliver Baldwin	Labour
1948 by-election	Douglas Johnston	Labour
1961 by-election	John Robertson	Labour
1976	John Robertson	Scottish Labour Party (1976)
1979	Allen Adams	Labour
1983	constituency abolished	

== Election results ==
=== Elections in the 1830s ===
General election 1832: Paisley
Party	Candidate	Votes	%
Whig	John Maxwell	775	81.2
Tory	John McKerrell	180	18.8
Majority		595	62.4
Turnout		955	76.9
Registered electors		1,242	
Whig win (new seat)			

Maxwell resigned, causing a by-election.

By-election, 24 March 1834: Paisley
Party	Candidate	Votes	%	±%
Whig	Daniel Sandford	542	50.2	−31.0
Radical	John Crawfurd	509	47.1	N/A
Tory	James Edward Gordon (MP)	29	2.7	−16.1
Majority		33	3.1	−59.3
Turnout		1,080	85.6	+8.7
Registered electors		1,261		
Whig hold		Swing	−7.5	

- Gordon retired in favour of Sandford

General election 1835: Paisley
Party	Candidate	Votes	%	±%
Whig	Alexander Graham Speirs	661	58.1	−23.1
Conservative	Horatio Ross	477	41.9	+23.1
Majority		184	16.2	−46.2
Turnout		1,138	75.4	−1.5
Registered electors		1,510		
Whig hold		Swing	−23.1	

Speirs resigned, causing a by-election.

By-election, 17 March 1836: Paisley
Party	Candidate	Votes	%	±%
Radical	Archibald Hastie	680	56.2	N/A
Radical	James Aytoun	529	43.8	N/A
Majority		151	12.4	N/A
Turnout		1,209	82.5	+7.1
Registered electors		1,465		
Radical gain from Whig		Swing	N/A	

General election 1837: Paisley
Party	Candidate	Votes	%
Radical	Archibald Hastie	Unopposed	
Registered electors		1,610	
Radical gain from Whig			

=== Elections in the 1840s ===
General election 1841: Paisley
Party	Candidate	Votes	%	±%
Radical	Archibald Hastie	157	100.0	N/A
Chartist	William Thomason	0	0.0	New
Majority		157	100.0	N/A
Turnout		157	11.9	N/A
Registered electors		1,324		
Radical hold		Swing	N/A	

General election 1847: Paisley
Party	Candidate	Votes	%	±%
Radical	Archibald Hastie	Unopposed		
Registered electors		1,060		
Radical hold				

=== Elections in the 1850s ===
General election 1852: Paisley
Party	Candidate	Votes	%	±%
Radical	Archibald Hastie	406	52.1	N/A
Radical	William Taylor Haly	374	47.9	N/A
Majority		32	4.2	N/A
Turnout		780	58.1	N/A
Registered electors		1,342		
Radical hold		Swing	N/A	

General election 1857: Paisley
Party	Candidate	Votes	%	±%
Radical	Archibald Hastie	611	53.6	+1.5
Whig	Humphrey Crum-Ewing	524	46.0	N/A
Chartist	Charles Favell Forth Wordsworth	4	0.4	New
Majority		87	7.6	+3.4
Turnout		1,139	87.3	+29.2
Registered electors		1,305		
Radical hold		Swing	N/A	

Hastie's death caused a by-election.

By-election, 11 December 1857: Paisley
Party	Candidate	Votes	%	±%
Whig	Humphrey Crum-Ewing	767	88.7	+42.7
Radical	William Taylor Haly	98	11.3	−42.3
Majority		669	77.4	N/A
Turnout		865	64.1	−23.2
Registered electors		1,349		
Whig gain from Radical		Swing	+42.5	

General election 1859: Paisley
Party	Candidate	Votes	%	±%
Liberal	Humphrey Crum-Ewing	Unopposed		
Registered electors		1,370		
Liberal hold				

=== Elections in the 1860s ===
General election 1865: Paisley
Party	Candidate	Votes	%	±%
Liberal	Humphrey Crum-Ewing	Unopposed		
Registered electors		1,361		
Liberal hold				

General election 1868: Paisley
Party	Candidate	Votes	%	±%
Liberal	Humphrey Crum-Ewing	1,576	54.0	N/A
Conservative	Archibald Campbell	921	31.6	New
Liberal	Archibald Kintrea	421	14.4	N/A
Majority		655	22.4	N/A
Turnout		2,918	89.4	N/A
Registered electors		3,264		
Liberal hold		Swing	N/A	

=== Elections in the 1870s ===
General election 1874: Paisley
Party	Candidate	Votes	%	±%
Liberal	William Holms	Unopposed		
Registered electors		5,083		
Liberal hold				

=== Elections in the 1880s ===
General election 1880: Paisley
Party	Candidate	Votes	%	±%
Liberal	William Holms	Unopposed		
Registered electors		4,979		
Liberal hold				

Holms' resignation caused a by-election.

By-election, 18 Feb 1884: Paisley
Party	Candidate	Votes	%	±%
Liberal	Stewart Clark	3,049	62.8	N/A
Conservative	Ernest Hamilton	1,806	37.2	New
Majority		1,243	25.6	N/A
Turnout		4,855	85.4	N/A
Registered electors		5,688		
Liberal hold		Swing	N/A	

General election 1885: Paisley
Party	Candidate	Votes	%	±%
Liberal	William Barbour	3,390	57.3	N/A
Conservative	Robert Mure McKerrell	2,523	42.7	N/A
Majority		867	14.6	N/A
Turnout		5,913	87.0	N/A
Registered electors		6,794		
Liberal hold		Swing	N/A	

General election 1886: Paisley
Party	Candidate	Votes	%	±%
Liberal	William Barbour	3,057	55.1	−2.2
Liberal Unionist	James Smith	2,491	44.9	+2.2
Majority		566	10.2	−4.4
Turnout		5,548	81.7	−5.3
Registered electors		6,794		
Liberal hold		Swing	−2.2	

=== Elections in the 1890s ===
William Dunn

1891 Paisley by-election
Party	Candidate	Votes	%	±%
Liberal	William Dunn	4,145	59.6	+4.5
Conservative	Robert Mure McKerrell	2,807	40.4	−4.5
Majority		1,338	19.2	+9.0
Turnout		6,952	85.8	+4.1
Registered electors		8,107		
Liberal hold		Swing	+4.5	

General election 1892: Paisley
Party	Candidate	Votes	%	±%
Liberal	William Dunn	4,262	63.6	+8.5
Conservative	Christopher Nicholson Johnston	2,441	36.4	−8.5
Majority		1,821	27.2	+17.0
Turnout		6,703	81.5	−0.2
Registered electors		8,223		
Liberal hold		Swing	+8.5	

General election 1895: Paisley
Party	Candidate	Votes	%	±%
Liberal	William Dunn	4,404	59.0	−4.6
Conservative	Alexander Moffat	3,062	41.0	+4.6
Majority		1,342	18.0	−9.2
Turnout		7,466	82.0	+0.5
Registered electors		9,105		
Liberal hold		Swing	−4.6	

=== Elections in the 1900s ===
Sir William Dunn

General election 1900: Paisley
Party	Candidate	Votes	%	±%
Liberal	William Dunn	4,532	56.6	−2.4
Conservative	George Swinton	3,474	43.4	+2.4
Majority		1,058	13.2	−4.8
Turnout		8,006	74.4	−7.6
Registered electors		10,758		
Liberal hold		Swing	−2.4	

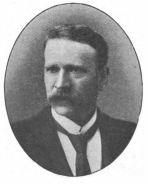
Robert Smillie

General election 1906: Paisley
Party	Candidate	Votes	%	±%
Liberal	John McCallum	5,664	52.7	−3.9
Liberal Unionist	James MacKean	2,594	24.2	−19.2
Scottish Workers	Robert Smillie	2,482	23.1	New
Majority		3,070	28.5	+15.3
Turnout		10,740	88.2	+13.8
Registered electors		12,179		
Liberal hold		Swing	+7.7	

=== Elections in the 1910s ===
McCallum

General election January 1910: Paisley
Party	Candidate	Votes	%	±%
Liberal	John McCallum	6,812	63.7	+11.0
Conservative	Duncan Campbell	3,890	36.3	+12.1
Majority		2,922	27.4	−1.1
Turnout		10,702	86.8	−1.4
Registered electors		12,331		
Liberal hold		Swing	−0.6	

General election December 1910: Paisley
Party	Candidate	Votes	%	±%
Liberal	John McCallum	6,039	64.3	+0.6
Conservative	Alfred Jephcott	3,350	35.7	−0.6
Majority		2,689	28.6	+1.2
Turnout		9,389	74.9	−11.9
Registered electors		12,541		
Liberal hold		Swing	+0.6	

General Election 1914–15: Another General Election was required to take place before the end of 1915. The political parties had been making preparations for an election to take place and by July 1914, the following candidates had been selected;

- Liberal: John McCallum
- Unionist:

General election 1918: Paisley
Party		Candidate	Votes	%	±%
	Liberal	John McCallum	7,542	34.0	−30.3
	Co-operative Party	John Biggar	7,436	33.5	New
C	National Democratic	John Taylor	7,201	32.5	New
Majority			106	0.5	−28.1
Turnout			22,179	57.6	−17.3
Registered electors			38,508		
	Liberal hold		Swing		
C indicates candidate endorsed by the coalition government.

=== Elections in the 1920s ===
1920 Paisley by-election
Party		Candidate	Votes	%	±%
	Liberal	H. H. Asquith	14,736	48.4	+14.4
	Co-operative Party	John Biggar	11,902	39.1	+5.6
C	Unionist	James Anderson Dunlop MacKean	3,795	12.5	New
Majority			2,834	9.3	+8.8
Turnout			30,433	77.6	+20.0
Registered electors			39,235		
	Liberal hold		Swing	+4.4	
C indicates candidate endorsed by the coalition government.

General election 1922: Paisley
Party	Candidate	Votes	%	±%
Liberal	H. H. Asquith	15,005	50.5	+16.5
Co-operative Party	John Biggar	14,689	49.5	+16.0
Majority		316	1.0	+0.5
Turnout		29,694	78.0	+22.4
Registered electors		38,093		
Liberal hold		Swing	+0.3	

General election 1923: Paisley
Party	Candidate	Votes	%	±%
Liberal	H. H. Asquith	9,723	33.4	−17.1
Co-operative Party	John Biggar	7,977	27.4	−22.1
Unionist	McInnes Shaw	7,758	26.6	New
Independent Labour	D.D. Cormack*	3,685	12.6	New
Majority		1,746	6.0	+5.0
Turnout		29,143	77.1	−0.9
Registered electors		37,792		
Liberal hold		Swing	+2.5	

* Cormack was the nominee of the local branch of the Labour party, which did not accept Biggar as the official candidate.

Mitchell

General election 1924: Paisley
Party	Candidate	Votes	%	±%
Labour	Edward Mitchell	17,057	53.5	+26.1
Liberal	H H Asquith	14,829	46.5	+13.1
Majority		2,228	7.0	N/A
Turnout		31,886	84.1	+7.0
Registered electors		37,901		
Labour gain from Liberal		Swing	+6.5	

General election 1929: Paisley
Party	Candidate	Votes	%	±%
Labour	James C. Welsh	22,425	55.8	+2.3
Liberal	James McCulloch	10,640	26.5	−20.0
Unionist	Minna Cowan	7,094	17.7	New
Majority		11,785	29.3	+22.3
Turnout		40,159	78.2	−5.9
Registered electors		51,385		
Labour hold		Swing	+11.2	

=== Elections in the 1930s ===
General election 1931: Paisley
Party	Candidate	Votes	%	±%
Liberal	Joseph Maclay	26,187	61.8	+35.3
Labour	James C. Welsh	16,183	38.2	−17.6
Majority		10,004	23.6	N/A
Turnout		42,370	79.4	+1.2
Liberal gain from Labour		Swing		

General election 1935: Paisley
Party	Candidate	Votes	%	±%
Liberal	Joseph Maclay	22,466	50.4	−11.4
Labour	Oliver Baldwin	22,077	49.6	+11.4
Majority		389	0.8	−22.8
Turnout		44,543	79.7	+0.3
Liberal hold		Swing		

General Election 1939–40: Another General Election was required to take place before the end of 1940. The political parties had been making preparations for an election to take place and by the Autumn of 1939, the following candidates had been selected;

- Liberal National: Joseph Maclay
- Labour: Oliver Baldwin

=== Election in the 1940s ===
General election 1945: Paisley
Party	Candidate	Votes	%	±%
Labour	Oliver Baldwin	25,156	55.6	+6.0
Unionist	Tam Galbraith	14,826	32.7	New
Liberal	Louise Glen-Coats	4,532	10.0	−40.4
Independent	Allan Richard Eagles	765	1.7	New
Majority		10,330	22.9	N/A
Turnout		45,279	74.1	−5.6
Labour gain from Liberal		Swing		

1948 Paisley by-election
Party	Candidate	Votes	%	±%
Labour	Douglas Johnston	27,213	56.8	+1.2
Independent	John MacCormick	20,668	43.2	New
Majority		6,545	13.6	−9.3
Turnout		47,881		
Labour hold		Swing		

=== Elections in the 1950s ===
General election 1950: Paisley
Party	Candidate	Votes	%	±%
Labour	Douglas Johnston	29,204	56.12	+0.5
Unionist	H Black	19,001	36.52	+3.8
Liberal	Vaughan M Shaw	3,830	7.36	−2.6
Majority		10,203	19.60	−3.3
Turnout		52,035	84.10	+10.0
Registered electors		61,874		
Labour hold		Swing	-1.85	

General election 1951: Paisley
Party	Candidate	Votes	%	±%
Labour	Douglas Johnston	29,570	55.37	−0.75
Unionist	John F Wilson	16,545	30.98	−5.54
Liberal	Vaughan M Shaw	7,291	13.65	+6.29
Majority		13,025	24.39	+4.79
Turnout		53,406	84.40	+0.30
Registered electors		63,281		
Labour hold		Swing	+2.40	

General election 1955: Paisley
Party	Candidate	Votes	%	±%
Labour	Douglas Johnston	26,723	56.41	+1.04
Unionist	Robert D Kernohan	20,725	43.59	+12.61
Majority		6,098	12.82	−11.57
Turnout		47,548	76.23	−8.17
Registered electors		62,376		
Labour hold		Swing	-5.79	

General election 1959: Paisley
Party	Candidate	Votes	%	±%
Labour	Douglas Johnston	28,519	57.30	+0.89
Unionist	Geoffrey R Rickman	21,250	42.70	−0.89
Majority		7,269	14.60	+1.78
Turnout		49,769	78.88	+2.65
Registered electors		63,097		
Labour hold		Swing	+0.89	

=== Election in the 1960s ===
1961 Paisley by-election
Party	Candidate	Votes	%	±%
Labour	John Robertson	19,200	45.35	−11.95
Liberal	John Bannerman	17,542	41.43	New
Unionist	Geoffrey R. Rickman	5,597	13.22	−29.48
Majority		1,658	3.92	−10.69
Turnout		42,339	68.10	−10.78
Labour hold		Swing	-26.7	

General election 1964: Paisley
Party	Candidate	Votes	%	±%
Labour	John Robertson	26,318	52.91	−4.39
Liberal	John Bannerman	16,837	33.85	N/A
Unionist	Maurice Crichton	6,583	13.24	−29.46
Majority		9,481	19.06	+4.46
Turnout		49,738	79.79	+0.91
Registered electors		62,336		
Labour hold		Swing	-19.12	

General election 1966: Paisley
Party	Candidate	Votes	%	±%
Labour	John Robertson	28,074	59.97	+7.06
Conservative	Maurice Crichton	10,871	23.22	+9.98
Liberal	Vaughan M Shaw	7,871	16.81	−17.04
Majority		17,203	36.75	+17.69
Turnout		46,816	76.29	−3.50
Registered electors		61,363		
Labour hold		Swing	-1.46	

=== Elections in the 1970s ===
General election 1970: Paisley
Party	Candidate	Votes	%	±%
Labour	John Robertson	25,429	54.09	−5.88
Conservative	John Cooperwhite Workman	15,232	32.40	+9.18
SNP	Margo MacDonald	3,432	7.30	New
Liberal	Alan Sked	2,918	6.21	−10.60
Majority		10,197	21.69	−15.06
Turnout		47,011	71.44	−4.85
Labour hold		Swing		

General election February 1974: Paisley
Party	Candidate	Votes	%	±%
Labour	John Robertson	23,820	48.42	−5.67
Conservative	John Cooperwhite Workman	14,923	30.33	−2.07
SNP	David Rollo	10,455	21.25	+13.95
Majority		8,897	18.09	−3.60
Turnout		49,198	75.16	+3.72
Labour hold		Swing		

General election October 1974: Paisley
Party	Candidate	Votes	%	±%
Labour	John Robertson	21,368	44.79	−3.63
SNP	David Rollo	15,778	33.08	+11.83
Conservative	Ian Robertson	7,440	15.60	−14.73
Liberal	Donald Thompson	3,116	6.53	New
Majority		5,590	11.71	−6.34
Turnout		47,702	72.21	−2.95
Labour hold		Swing	-7.72	

General election 1979: Paisley
Party	Candidate	Votes	%	±%
Labour	Allen Adams	25,894	55.79	+11.00
Conservative	George Wills	12,139	26.15	+10.55
SNP	David Rollo	7,305	15.74	−17.34
SLP	Brian Monaghan	811	1.75	N/A
Communist	June Janette Tait	145	0.31	New
Workers Revolutionary	Thomas White	122	0.26	New
Majority		13,755	29.64	+17.93
Turnout		46,416	72.79	+0.58
Labour hold		Swing	+0.22	
