= Edward Mitchell (Scottish politician) =

British politician (1879–1965)

Mitchell

Edward Rosslyn Mitchell (16 May 1879 – 31 October 1965) was a politician who as Member of Parliament (MP) represented the constituency of Paisley, Scotland in the House of Commons of the United Kingdom from 1924 to 1929. He sat as a Labour Party MP, but had earlier unsuccessfully stood for the Liberal Party.

He was educated at Hillhead High School and then the University of Glasgow.

He stood as Liberal candidate for Buteshire in the December 1910 general election. He was called 'The Pocket Rosebery'. He was Labour candidate for Glasgow Central against Prime Minister Bonar Law at the 1922 general election and the 1923 general election. He was elected the Member of Parliament for Paisley in 1924, beating former Prime Minister H. H. Asquith. He stood down in 1929.

Parliament of the United Kingdom
Preceded by H. H. Asquith	Member of Parliament for Paisley; 1924 – 1929	Succeeded by James Welsh
