= Vogue Cinema Possilpark =

Building in Glasgow, Scotland

Vogue Cinema
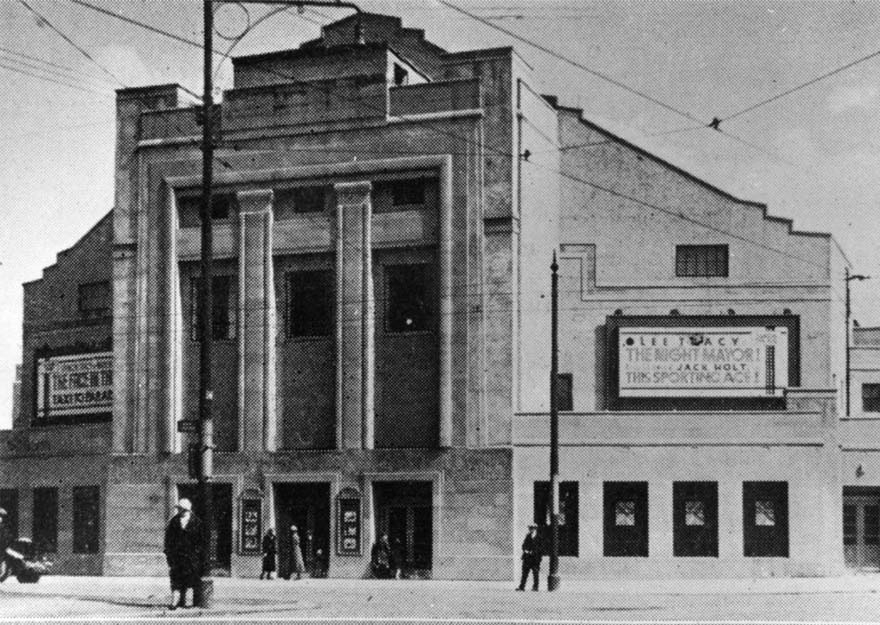
- The Mecca Cinema, Balmore Road, Possilpark, in its opening year, 1933, showing The Night Mayor and This Sporting Age
- Interactive map of Vogue Cinema
- Former names: Mecca (1933–1950)
- Address: 124 Balmore Road, Possilpark, Glasgow, Scotland G22 6LJ
- Coordinates: 55.8869°N 4.2568°W
- Owner: George Smith and James Welsh (Paisley MP); George Singleton Cinemas Ltd.
- Capacity: 1,620
- Type: Indoor movie theater
- Designation: Category C Listed building

Construction
- Opened: 16 August 1933
- Closed: August 1969 (as cinema)
- Architect: James McKissack

The Vogue Cinema Possil is a category C(S) listed building, it is situated on 124 Balmore Road, Possilpark in the north of Glasgow, Scotland. The former art deco cinema opened in 1933 as the Mecca.

== History ==
The building in 2008, during its time as premises for a business adapting vehicles for use by disabled persons

Opening as the Mecca on 16 August 1933 and designed by the architect James McKissack, it was an example of Glasgow's art deco cinemas when Glasgow was called "Cinema City", featuring a modern-classical style with distinctive red sandstone, faience and harking façade, making it a visually striking and prominent landmark in the area. It originally seated 1,620. The interior was decorated in 'jazz moderne' style, a variation of Art Deco, with features including stained glass lights in the stairwells, robust terrazzo flooring in the hallways and an ornate proscenium arch and curtains, adorned with wave and zigzag motifs.

The Mecca was owned by George Smith and James Welsh, both of whom were Glasgow Corporation councillors, highlighting the venue's significance in the city’s cultural landscape. The cinema was established to serve the burgeoning Possilpark community, particularly the new municipal housing estate.

In its inaugural year, 1933, the Mecca Picture House featured contemporary films such as The Night Mayor starring Lee Tracy and This Sporting Age starring Jack Holt.

In January 1950 it was sold to the Singleton circuit, and renamed Vogue. The cinema stopped showing films on Saturday 2 August 1969 with its final programme being the Steve McQueen film 'Bullitt'. After renovation it was converted to a bingo hall.

For 11 years the vogue cinema was a highland wear shop. The hire company (A1 Kilt Hire) were expelled from the building so that it could be demolished. This ended the building's great history in serving as commercial hub for the community.

Although this historic cinema was temporarily saved from demolition in 2024 following public outcry, it remained under threat as the owner appealed the decision to have the building listed. Campaigner and DJ Andrew Moore created a campaign and petition in November 2024 in an effort to prevent further demolition. In July 2025, the appeal to overturn the listing was formally rejected by Historic Environment Scotland and the Scottish Government. The cinema remains protected as a category C(S) listed building.

== See also ==
- Possil railway station (listed building nearby)
- Glasgow Film Theatre (by same architect)
