= John Biggar (Scottish politician) =

Scottish politician

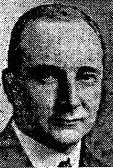
Biggar in 1922

John McLaren Biggar (1874 – 8 August 1943) was a Scottish politician.

Born in Glasgow, Biggar was educated at the Glasgow City Public School before becoming an accountant. In time, he founded his own accountancy firm, Biggar, May and Forsyth. He became active in public life in the 1900s, initially through membership of the New Kilpatrick School Board, then moved to the Glasgow School Board.

Biggar was also active in the co-operative movement. An early member of the Co-operative Party, he stood as its candidate in Paisley at the 1918 general election, and again at a by-election in 1920 and general elections in 1922 and 1923, but was never elected.

In 1929, Biggar was elected to the Glasgow Corporation, representing the Labour Party, which had formed a national coalition with the Co-operative Party. During the 1930s, he also served as president of the London Association of Certified Accountants, then in 1941 was elected as Lord Provost of Glasgow. He served in the post until his death two years later, becoming the first Lord Provost to die in office in over one hundred years.

Civic offices
Preceded by Patrick Dollan	Lord Provost of Glasgow; 1941 – 1943	Succeeded by James Welsh
