= Douglas Johnston, Lord Johnston =

British politician (1907–1985)

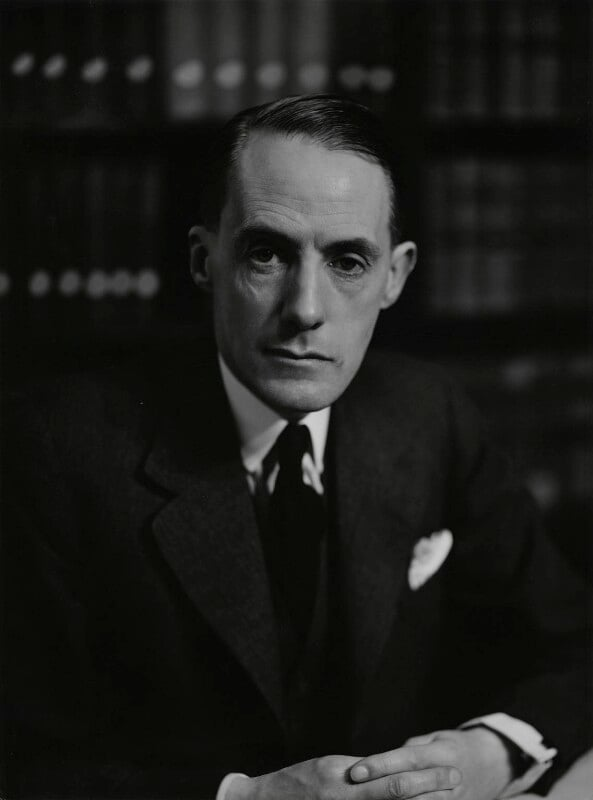
Johnston in 1949

Douglas Harold Johnston, Lord Johnston, TD (1 February 1907 – 18 February 1985) was a Scottish Advocate, politician and Judge. He served as a Minister in the government of Clement Attlee and ended his career as a Senator of the College of Justice. Johnston took the legal title Lord Johnston.

== Education ==
Johnston's father Joseph was also an Advocate; he was born in Aberdeen and educated at Aberdeen Grammar School. He then went on to St John's College, Oxford followed by the University of Edinburgh at both of which he studied law. He was called to the Bar in England by the Inner Temple in 1931, and to the Scottish Bar in 1932.

== Career ==
On 4 April 1936 Johnston married Doris Isobel Kidd, the daughter of James Kidd who was Conservative Member of Parliament for Linlithgowshire from 1918 to 1928. They had two sons and two daughters. During the Second World War he served in the army; on his return he was promoted to be an Advocate Depute, a crown prosecutor, in 1945. He was made a Scottish King's Counsel in October 1947.

== Political career ==
Johnston had become a supporter of the Labour Party and on 29 October 1947 he was appointed as Solicitor General for Scotland, a government position. He was not then a Member of Parliament but when the constituency of Paisley was vacated by Viscount Corvedale on inheriting his father's Earldom, Johnston was selected to follow him as Labour candidate on 8 January 1948. In the ensuing by-election he faced a straight fight with J.M. MacCormick, a Glasgow solicitor who had been a prominent Scottish Nationalist and was adopted as candidate both by the Conservatives and Liberals. Johnston won by 6,545 votes.

Johnston retained his government post until Labour went out of office in 1951. He then became an opposition front-bencher. In May 1954 he moved the rejection of the Town and Country Planning (Scotland) Bill on the grounds that it burdened the community with the cost of compensating landowners for the loss of land value. He was not a prominent figure, concentrating on the details of policy. In the meantime he kept up his practice at the Scottish Bar, often appearing at public inquiries.

== Judicial post ==
In January 1961, Johnston was named as a Senator of the College of Justice, a judicial post, an appointment which vacated his Parliamentary seat. He took the judicial title of Lord Johnston. In December 1963 he found that the national joint council responsible for setting teachers' salaries had not been properly constituted, and awarded the schoolteachers who had brought the case their expenses. He was appointed as Chairman of the Royal Fine Art Commission for Scotland in 1965.

After the conviction of three Glasgow youths who had killed a man in a street fight in 1977, Johnston decided to defer the sentencing for 12 months. This action was criticised by the Scottish Police Federation. Johnston retired in 1978.

== Sources ==
- M. Stenton and S. Lees, "Who's Who of British MPs" Vol. IV (Harvester Press, 1981)
- "Who Was Who", A & C Black
- "The Hon. Lord Johnston" (Obituary), The Times, 21 February 1985

Political offices
Preceded by John Wheatley	Solicitor General for Scotland; 1947–1951	Succeeded by William Rankine Milligan
Parliament of the United Kingdom
Preceded by Viscount Corvedale	Member of Parliament for Paisley; 1948–1961	Succeeded by John Robertson
