= William Bolitho Ryall =

South African journalist, writer and biographer

- Born: Charles William Ryall; January 1891; Droitwich
- Died: 2 June 1930 (aged 39); Avignon
- Occupations: Novelist, journalist

William Bolitho Ryall (1891–1930) was a South African journalist, writer and biographer who was a valued friend of prominent writers such as Ernest Hemingway, Noël Coward, Walter Lippmann and Walter Duranty. He wrote under the name 'William Bolitho' but was known to his friends as 'Bill Ryall'. He died on 2 June 1930 at the age of 39 just as his reputation was being established.

== Life ==
Ryall was born as Charles William Ryall in Droitwich, in January 1891. His father was a Baptist minister, born in South Africa and he was taken there as an infant. He changed his name to 'William Bolitho Ryall' which was his uncle's name who died in South Africa and who wrote the book Pensam: His Mysterious Tribulation published in 1883. Before enlisting in the British Army he had gone to seminary in Gordonstown South African and become a deacon in the Anglican Church. In 1916 he was buried alive with fifteen other men in a mine explosion on the Somme. He was the only survivor and was initially thought to be dead, but was unconscious with a broken neck and other injuries. He spent a year convalescing in a Scottish military hospital but never fully recovered his health.

=== Journalism ===
After the war he became the Paris correspondent of the Manchester Guardian, for which he covered the 1919 Peace Conference at Versailles. In 1920 he reported on the communist rebellion in the Ruhr valley in Germany. This incident later became the subject of his play entitled Overture. In 1923 he was appointed correspondent with the New York World to which he contributed many notable dispatches. In 1924 he reported on the housing conditions in Glasgow and these dispatches were published in the World and in the book, The Cancer of Empire. In 1925 he travelled throughout Italy interviewing people about Mussolini's regime and this resulted in the book Italy under Mussolini which brought to public notice the abuses of Mussolini's power. Ryall arrived in New York on 26 September 1928, having sailed from Southampton on the S.S. Homerio. He then had a thrice weekly column with the New York World.

=== Twelve Against the Gods ===
This book was published in 1929 and was an instant bestseller, being written in a racy, journalistic style. It covers the lives of twelve individuals in the following order: Alexander the Great, Casanova, Christopher Columbus, Mahomet, Lola Montez, Cagliostro (and Seraphina), Charles XII of Sweden, Napoleon I, Lucius Sergius Catiline, Napoleon III, Isadora Duncan, and Woodrow Wilson. Adventure is the theme that unites this unlikely assemblage. Bolitho argues that they were all adventurers who battled convention and conformity to achieve fame or notoriety. He sees human endeavour as a duality between conformity and non-conformity. "We are born adventurers, and the love of adventures never leaves us till we are very old; old, timid men, in whose interest it is that adventure should quite die out. This is why all the poets are on one side, and all the laws on the other; for laws are made by, and usually for, old men." He points out that their lives show the difficulties involved, and the scant reward to be expected from such adventuring.

=== Last Days ===
Bolitho left New York City in April 1929 and travelled to London where a production of his play Overture was being organized. But by May he was not well and he travelled to his small château called La Préfète at Montfavet near Avignon, France, to recuperate. He had bought La Préfète while he lived in Paris and he planned to use his substantial income from writing to develop the garden with exotic African fruits and flowers. He had told Duranty that it would be a "place of wonder and beauty, no matter what it costs" but Duranty adds: "Poor Bolitho! He did not know that it would cost his life. An attack of acute appendicitis wrongly diagnosed by a local doctor, then a last minute rush in a local ambulance to the operating-table in Avignon, where he arrived too late; and death from peritonitis after thirty-six hours of agony." His play, Overture, was later performed at the Longacre Theatre, New York from 5 Dec 1930 to Jan 1931 with 41 performances. This is its only known performance.

== Reputation ==
Noël Coward:
"He died young enough to be called 'brilliant', and not decrepit enough to be called 'great', which is sad, because he would have enjoyed hugely that particular form of eminence, and I feel that he would have given his wreath of laurels a slightly rakish tilt, however old he was."
Ernest Hemingway:
"In the old days, when your correspondent was a working newspaper man, he had a friend named Bill Ryall, then a European correspondent for the Manchester Guardian. This Ryall had a white, lantern-jawed face of the sort that is supposed to haunt you if seen suddenly in a London fog, but on a bright windy day in Paris meeting him on the boulevard wearing a long fur-collared great coat he had the never-far-from-tragic look of a ham Shakespearean actor. None of us thought of him as a genius then and I do not think he thought of himself as one either, being too busy, too intelligent, and, then, too sardonic to go in for being a genius in a city where they were a nickel a dozen and it was much more distinguished to be hard working. He was a South African and had been very badly blown up in the war while commanding infantry. Afterwards he had gotten into the intelligence service and at the time of the peace conference he had been a sort of pay-off man for the disbursing of certain sums spent by the British to subsidize and influence certain individuals and certain organs of the French press. He talked very frankly about this and as I was a kid then he told me many things that were the beginning of whatever education I received in international politics. Later Ryall wrote under the name of William Bolitho, went to New York, became a genius, and worked at it until he died. You may have read his Murder For Profit, his Twelve Against The Gods, or some of the pieces he wrote in the old N.Y. World. I never saw him after he became Bolitho, but when he was Ryall he was a wonderful guy. He may have been even finer when he was Bolitho but I do not see how it would be possible. I think sometimes being a genius in that hick town must have bored him very much. But I never saw him to ask him.”
Walter Lippmann:
“For Bolitho was a radiant person. In his company ordinary things were transfigured, acquiring the glamour of mystery and great import. His talk had a quality which belonged to one who dwelt familiarly, so it seemed, with the hidden elements of man's life and with the infinite permutations of his affairs. In his presence it was easy to believe that one had a private revelation of those great concerns which in prosaic living seem verbal and remote; with him one walked quickly through portals, that are usually closed, into the statelier mansions of the soul. He was an eager guide. Whoever happened to be there, he took with him in his explorations, not pausing to ask whether his companion had the wit or the courage for such adventures. He was lavish in his talk."
Walter Duranty:
"Of all the people I have met in the last twenty years, and there have been some high-sounding names amongst them, I think Bolitho had the finest intellect. Under forty when he died, he had already made his name as a forceful and original writer, but his mental range wait far beyond the limits of literature. He possessed to a remarkable degree the same quality which proved the key to Lenin's success, namely, the gift of making a quick and accurate summary of facts and drawing therefrom the right, logical and inevitable conclusions. . . . Unlike most people, he never blindly accepted the opinion of others, but always thought things out for himself, and never ceased to impress on me the necessity of doing that at all times."

== Publications ==
- Leviathan, (Essays, chiefly on international politics), London: Chapman & Dodd, 1923.
- Cancer of Empire, (On housing in Glasgow.) Illustrated with photographs by James McKissack. London, New York: G. P. Putnam's Sons, 1924.
- Murder for Profit, (Profiles of murderers), First published September 1926. London: Jonathan Cape, 1933. The Travellers' library
- Italy under Mussolini, New York: The Press Publishing Company, (New York World) 1926, London: The Macmillan Company, 1926.
- Twelve against the Gods: The Story of Adventure, London: William Heinemann Ltd, 1930, Harmondsworth: Penguin Books, 1939. [Penguin Books. no. 230.]
- Camera Obscura (A collection of his essays and articles), with Preface by Noël Coward, William Heinemann: London; [printed in U.S.A., 1931.]
- Overture. A drama in three acts, New York, [1931.] [French's Standard Library Edition.]
