= Glasgow Film Theatre =

Independent cinema in Glasgow, Scotland

Coordinates: 55°51′57″N 4°15′40″W

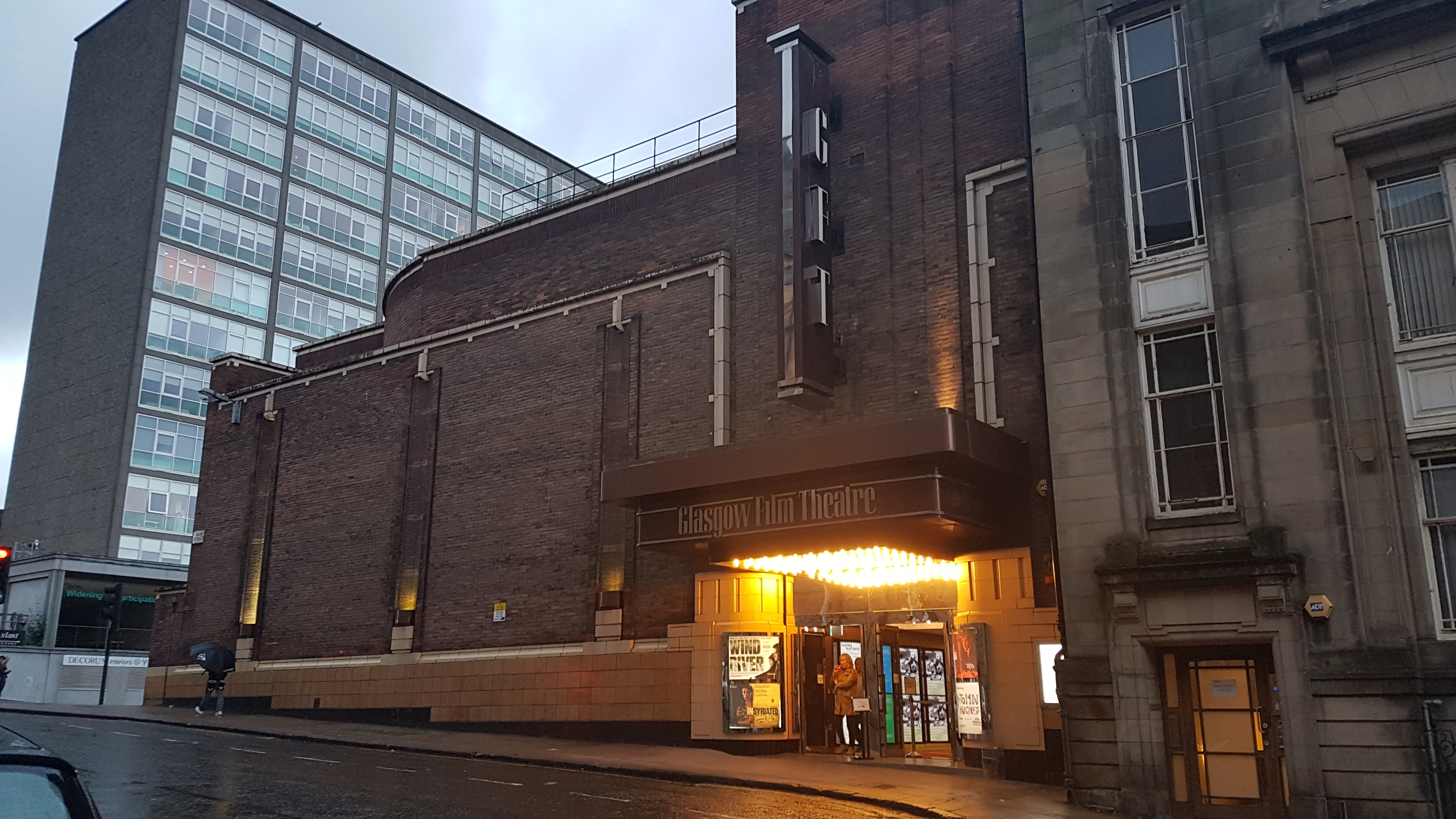
The Glasgow Film Theatre on Rose Street, Glasgow

The Glasgow Film Theatre (GFT) is an independent cinema in the city centre of Glasgow. It occupies a purpose-built cinema building, first opened in 1939, and now protected as a category B listed building.

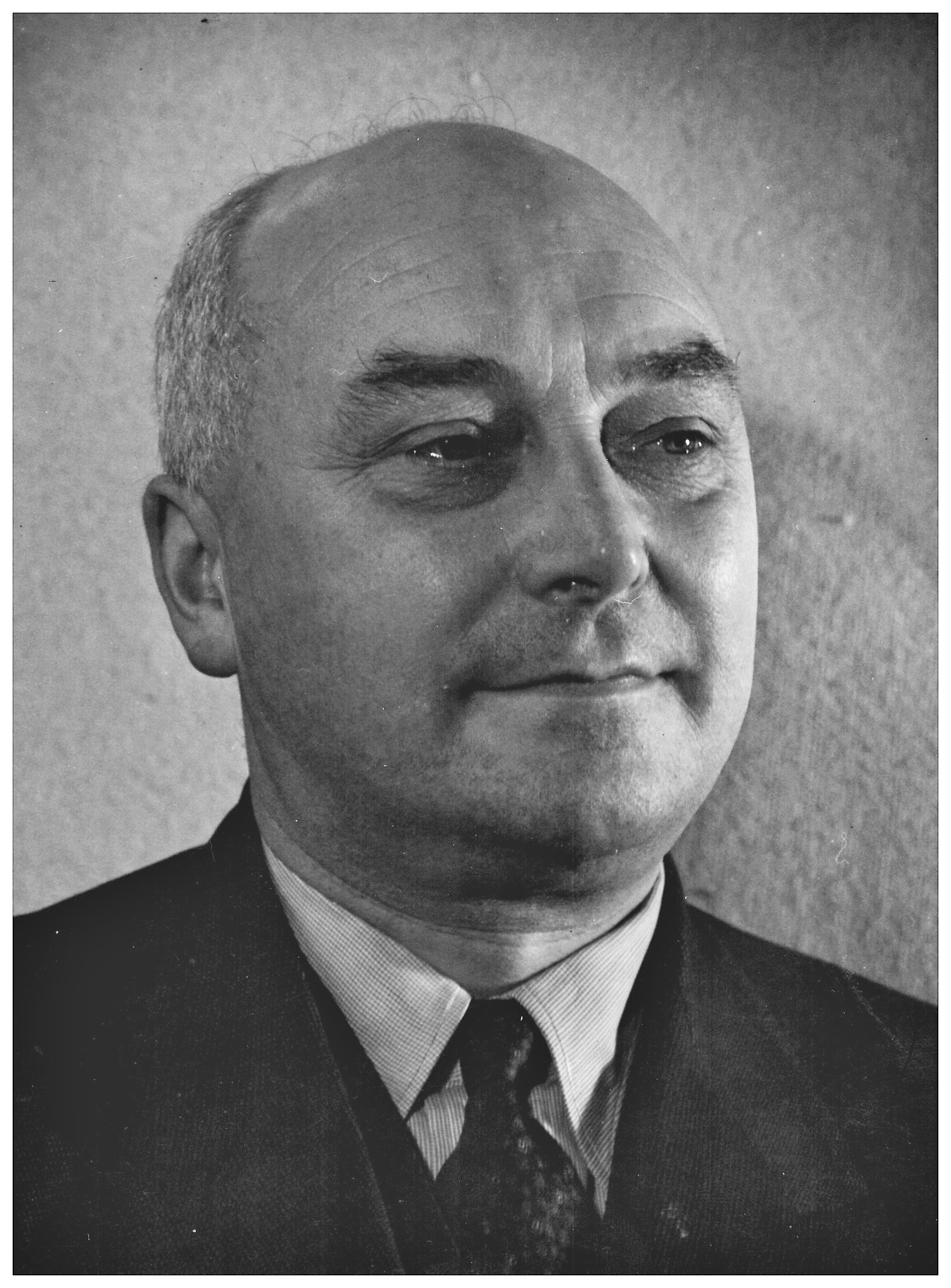
George Singleton founder of the Cosmo known as GFT today

== History and architecture ==
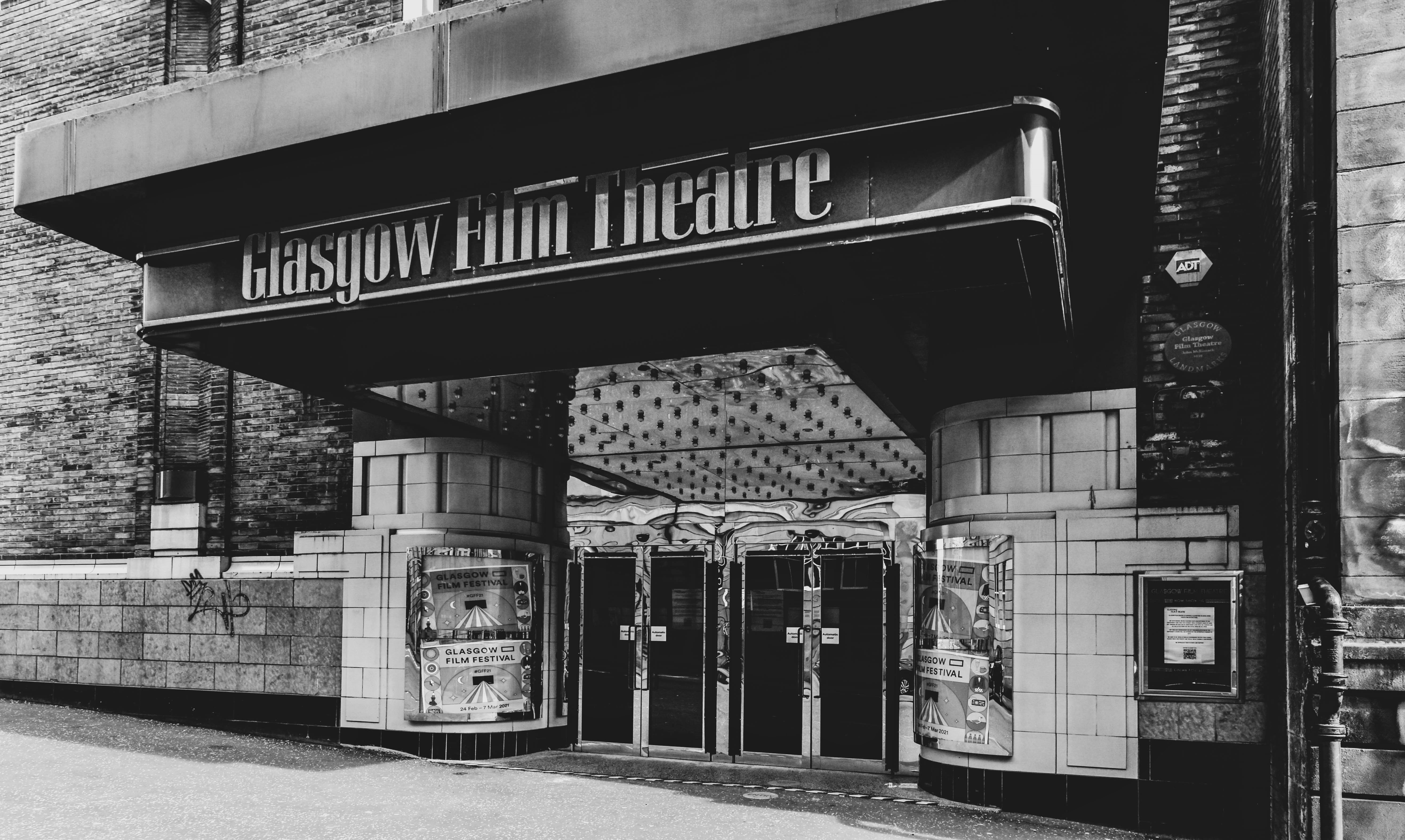
Glasgow Film Theatre was built as the Cosmo by George Singleton in 1939. Main entrance.

=== Predecessor: The Cosmo ===
GFT's predecessor, the Cosmo, was Scotland's first arts cinema and only the second purpose-built arthouse in Britain, after the Curzon Mayfair in London. Opened on 18 May 1939, it was also the last cinema to be built in Glasgow before the outbreak of WW2.

The Cosmo arrived at the close of an important decade for British film culture. With the advent of sound in film, language became a barrier and popular films from the continent quickly disappeared from British screens. In Glasgow, audiences for world cinema were served by the Film Society of Glasgow. Founded in 1929, this was the first cultural film group in Scotland, and its growing membership demonstrated a real appetite for foreign-language film in the city.

In fact, Glaswegians in this period had a healthy appetite for film in general: in 1939, they went to the cinema an average 51 times a year, compared to 35 times for the rest of Scotland, and 21 times in England. In 1939 Glasgow had 114 cinemas, with a total seating capacity of more than 175,000. But there was, as yet, no commercial arthouse cinema.

Spotting a gap in the market, and hence avoiding the major film distributors`routine of giving preference to UK-wide circuits, up stepped George Singleton, whose cinemas included elegant art deco buildings designed for him by James McKissack. He now headed one of Glasgow's illustrious cinema chain families, and would become a co-founder of the Glasgow Citizen's Theatre alongside James Bridie and Tom Honeyman. The name chosen of Cosmo was attractively brief for signage and advertising, and stemmed from cosmopolitan.

Singleton appointed his usual architects James McKissack and WJ Anderson II to work on the new cinema. Their design for the Cosmo's geometric, windowless façade was influenced by the work of Willem Marinus Dudok, a leading Dutch modernist architect. The international theme was continued outside in the choice of cladding materials – a mix of Ayrshire brick finished with faience cornices, set on a base of black Swedish granite – and inside, where a globe was installed over the stalls entrance. In its original layout, there was just a single auditorium, seating 850.

The Cosmo opened on Thursday 18 May, with an advertisement in the Glasgow Herald the following day promising future audiences a programme of ‘continental fiction films, revivals of British and American fiction films, documentary films, cartoons and news reels. There is only one qualification – they must be of first rate quality.’ The opening screening was Julien Duvivier's Un Carnet de Bal (1937).

The opening also saw the first appearance of Mr Cosmo, a dapper and bowler-hatted cartoon figure based on George Singleton, designed by Charles Oakley, Chair of the Film Society and the Scottish Film Council . Mr Cosmo figured on posters and adverts for the cinema, and popped up on-screen ahead of the main feature in a pose – comic or tragic – appropriate to each release. Over the years, he would become a familiar figure to generations of Glasgow cinema-goers and can be glimpsed around the GFT building to this day.

Quality European cinema was central to the Cosmo's programming from the start, with pre-reading of film catalogues being undertaken by Charles Oakley to assist the selections by George Singleton. Programmes in the summer of 1939 included La Grande Illusion (1937) and La Kermesse Heroique (1935). Though supplies dried up during WW2 and the cinema fell back on more mainstream English-language fare, screenings were enthusiastically resumed shortly thereafter. In February 1946, the Cosmo became the first cinema in the UK to screen a French film made under the Occupation, and Cosmo audiences also saw wartime German features, including – in breathtaking Agfacolour – The Adventures of Baron Munchausen (1943). Big hits at the cinema included Hamlet (which ran for eleven weeks in 1948), Les Enfants du Paradis (1945), Jazz on a Summer's Day (1959) and Disney's Fantasia (1941), a long-running Cosmo Christmas favourite. A ‘Cosmo Club’, offering films ‘unblessed by the Censor's certificate’, opened in 1960.

=== As the Glasgow Film Theatre ===
The Cosmo ran for three decades until economic circumstances dictated that it could not survive in its original form. On 21 April 1973 it was sold to the Scottish Film Council, re-opening the following year as the Glasgow Film Theatre with the former auditorium subdivided into a 404-seat cinema (now Screen 1) in the former balcony and a conference/exhibition space in the stalls. Mr Cosmo bowed out at a gala screening of Fantasia, announcing he would ‘watch with pride an affection this new development of the old tradition.’ The new cinema opened on 2 May 1974 with a screening of Fellini's Roma.

In its new guise, the cinema would continue to show films beyond the commercial mainstream. The key difference lay in GFT's broader remit. Taking London's National Film Theatre as a model, GFT continued to show the latest world cinema releases, but also advanced newer trends in film culture, collaborating with the Third Eye Centre (now the CCA Glasgow) to show experimental films, screening film seasons, retrospectives and late-night cult classics, and developing educational activities.

In 1986 GFT became a registered charity and embarked on a campaign to raise money for a second cinema to replace the old basement conference room. Screen 2 (with seats for 142), and the downstairs café-bar Café Cosmo, opened for business in 1991. Edinburgh-based architect James Doherty returned in 1998 to revamp the foyer; in a nod to the original design, the new foyer includes a mosaic globe designed by American Glasgow-based artist Todd Garner set into the floor. In the same period, new sets of curtains were commissioned from Glasgow School of Art graduate Adrienne Brennan (Screen 1) and Glasgow studio Timorous Beasties (Screen 2), both of which reference the ‘cosmos’ in their design.

In 1988 the building was B-listed by Historic Scotland.

In 2013 café cosmo was moved to the mezzanine level to make way for a 3rd cinema screen.

=== Notable guests ===
Over the years GFT has played host to guests including Richard Attenborough, Danny Boyle, Robert Carlyle, Robbie Coltrane, Sean Connery, Willem Dafoe, Carl Davis, Bill Forsyth, Stephen Fry, Peter Greenaway, David Hayman, Jane Horrocks, Eddie Izzard, Richard Linklater, Felicity Kendal, Janet Leigh, Mike Leigh, Ken Loach, Baz Luhrmann, David Lynch, Ewan McGregor, Hayley Mills, David Puttnam, Jean-Paul Rappeneau, Christopher Reeve, Nicolas Roeg, Mickey Rooney, Paul Schrader, Martin Scorsese, Tilda Swinton, Quentin Tarantino, Giuseppe Tornatore and Max von Sydow and Hannah Head-Rapson and Ewan Stewart.

== Films ==
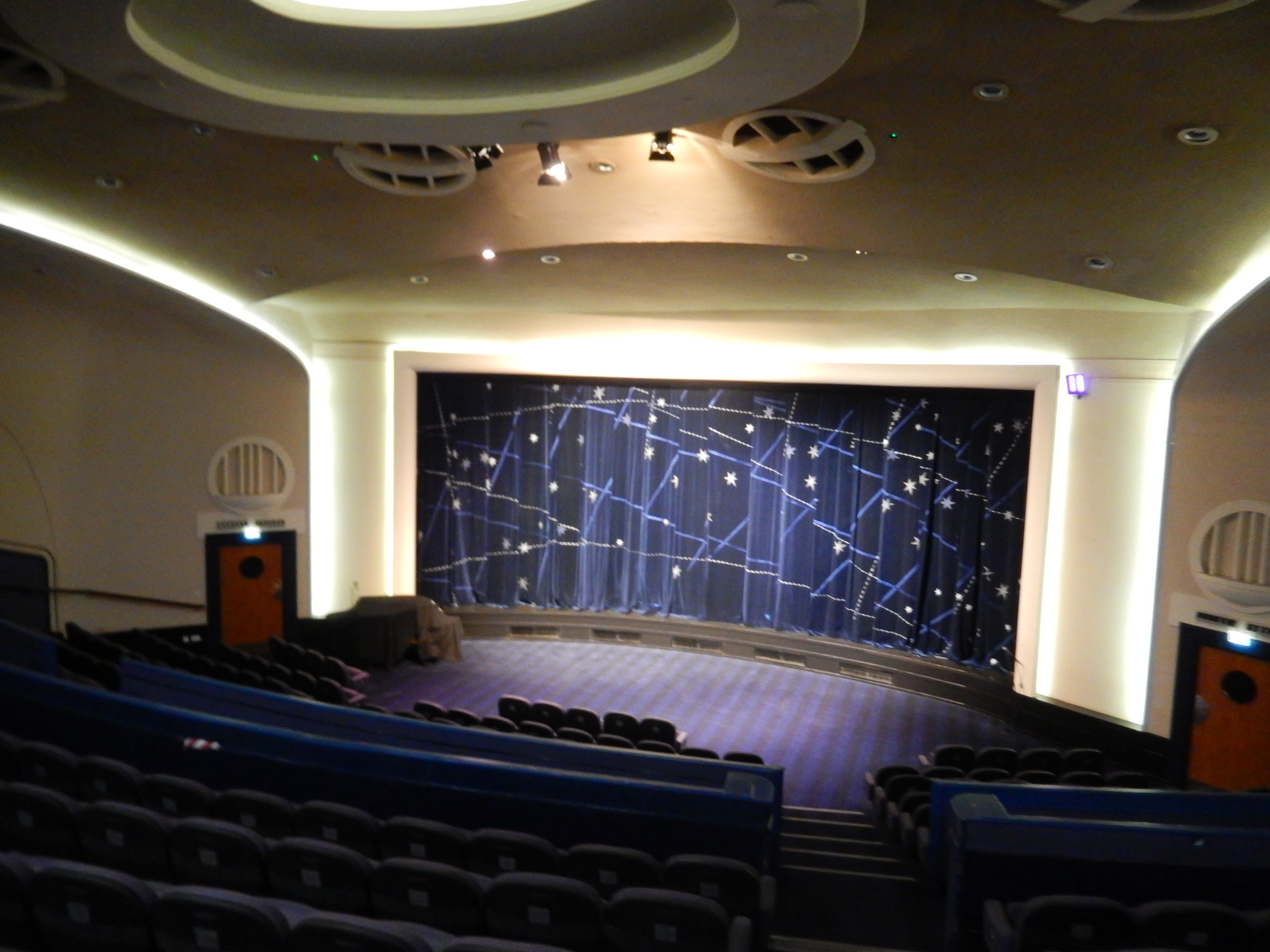
Cinema 1

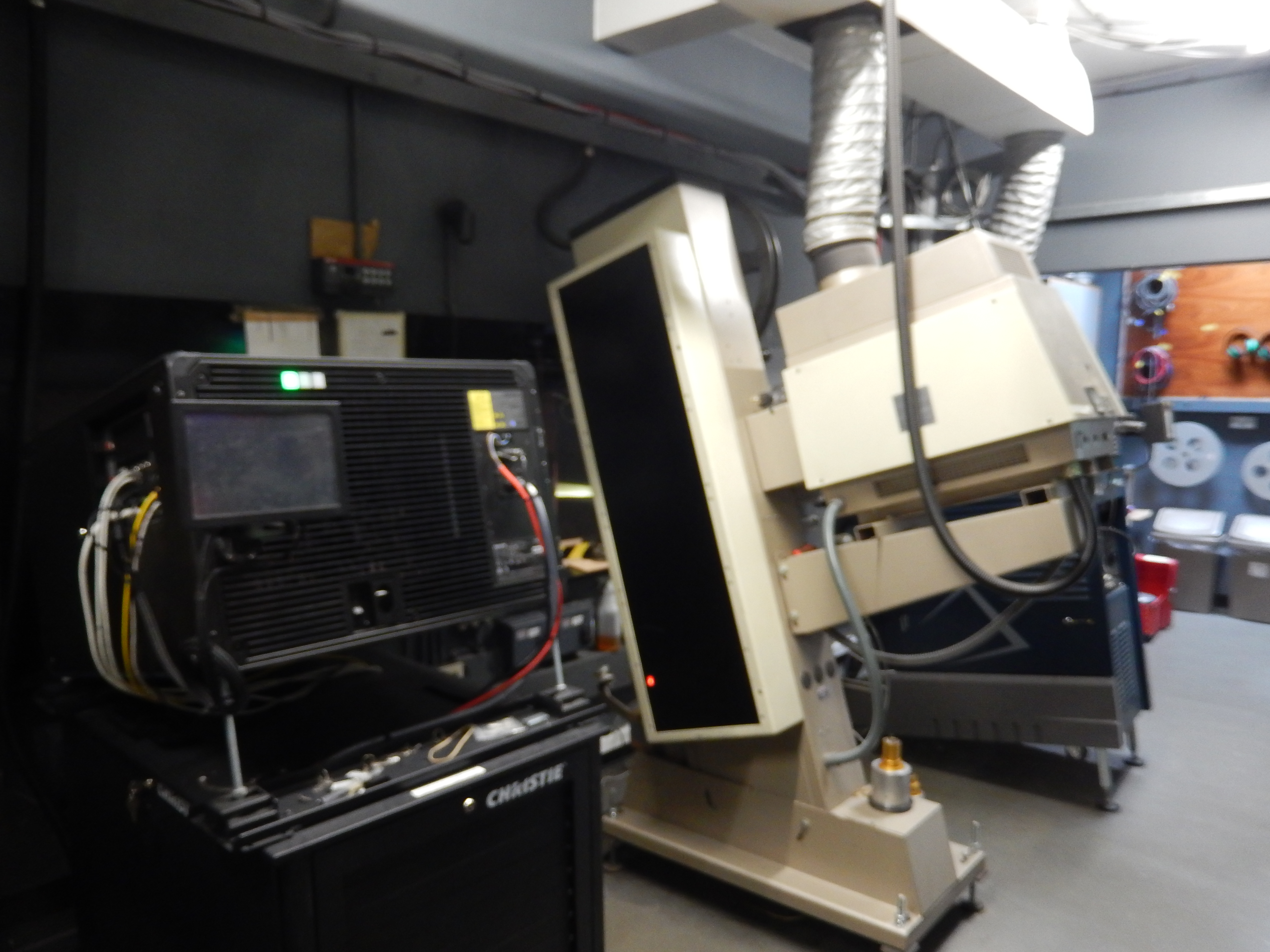
Film and digital projectors in Cinema 1 projection room.

GFT screens a wide variety of international cinema, classic films and documentaries alongside locally made work and material aimed at a range of community groups. In total, it shows over 600 different films every year, of which 60% are foreign-language.

In addition to daily screenings of films, GFT is host to a number of clubs and activities including a Film Discussion Group in the upstairs bar to discuss new mainstream and foreign-language releases.

Since 2005, GFT has been home to the Glasgow Film Festival. Held annually each February, the festival presents a programme of feature films, shorts, special events and live and interactive happenings from the GFT and other cinemas, galleries and unusual venues across the city.

== See also ==
- Vogue Cinema Possilpark
- James McKissack
