= Humphrey Crum-Ewing =

Humphrey Ewing Crum-Ewing (16 July 1802 – 3 July 1887) was a Scottish Liberal politician who sat in the House of Commons from 1857 to 1874.

Crum-Ewing was born Humphrey Crum, the son of Alexander Crum of Thornliebank, Renfrewshire and his wife Jane Maclae, daughter of Walter Ewing Maclae of Cathkin. His brother was the chemist Walter Crum.

He was educated at Glasgow College. In 1853, he assumed the name of Ewing in accordance with the will of his uncle James Ewing of Strathleven. He was the owner of Lismore Lodge (later McColl's Hotel) in Dunoon, as well as properties in the West Indies. He was chairman of the West Indian Association of Glasgow and a director of the Colonial Company of London. He was a Deputy Lieutenant of Dumbartonshire and J.P. for Dumbartonshire, Argyllshire, Lanarkarkshire, and Renfrewshire.

Crum-Ewing stood unsuccessfully for Paisley in April 1857, but was elected Member of Parliament for Paisley in November 1857. He held the seat until 1874. He was Lord Lieutenant of Dumbartonshire from 23 February 1874 until his death in 1887 at the age of 84.

Crum-Ewing married Helen Dick, daughter of the Rev. John Dick of Glasgow in 1826.

Parliament of the United Kingdom
Preceded by Archibald Hastie	Member of Parliament for Paisley; 1857 – 1874	Succeeded by William Holms
Honorary titles
Preceded by Sir James Colquhoun, 4th Bt	Lord Lieutenant of Dunbartonshire; 1874 – 1887	Succeeded by Sir James Colquhoun, 5th Bt
