= 1948 Paisley by-election =

UK parliamentary by-election

The 1948 Paisley by-election was a parliamentary by-election held on 18 February 1948 for the British House of Commons constituency of Paisley in Scotland. it was indirectly caused by the death of former Conservative Prime Minister Stanley Baldwin which elevated his son, the sitting Labour MP Oliver Baldwin, to become Earl Baldwin of Bewdley.

The election was a straight fight between Douglas Johnston for Labour and John MacCormick, a Scottish nationalist candidate with the support of the Conservative Party and the Liberal Party, with Johnston emerging the winner by 6,545 votes: Johnston received 27,213 votes to McCormick's 20,668.

== Result ==
Paisley by-election, 1948
Party	Candidate	Votes	%	±%
Labour	Douglas Johnston	27,213	56.8	+1.2
Independent	John MacCormick	20,668	43.2	New
Majority		6,545	13.6	−9.3
Turnout		47,881		
Labour hold		Swing		
