= James Welsh (Paisley MP) =

Scottish Labour Party politician

James Welsh (29 January 1881 – 16 December 1969) was a Scottish Labour Party politician.

Born in Paisley, Welsh owned a cinemas in Glasgow, and served for many years on Glasgow Corporation. He was elected at the 1929 general election as Member of Parliament (MP) for Paisley, but was defeated at the 1931 general election by the Liberal Party candidate Joseph Maclay.

Long a member of the Independent Labour Party, Welsh resigned in 1933 to join the Scottish Socialist Party. He served as Lord Provost of Glasgow from 1943 to 1945. In later life, he was a member of the Arts Council of Great Britain, chairing its Scottish Committee from 1946 to 1951.

== Cinemas ==
- Parade, in a rented hall in Alexandra Parade in Dennistoun
- Cinema House, in Church Street, Hamilton, South Lanarkshire

== Kingsway Cinema Ltd. ==
Welsh was the Cinema Director of Kingsway Cinema Ltd. George Smith was the Manager of Kingsway Cinema Ltd. Both were shareholders of Kingsway Cinema Ltd.

- New Parade at 200 Meadowpark Street in Dennistoun, built in 1921
- Kingsway Cinema, Cathcart district, on the south side of Glasgow, opened on 8 May 1929
- Riddrie Cinema, 726 Cumbernauld Road, Riddrie
- Mecca Picture House (later renamed Vogue Cinema Possilpark), Balmore Road, Possil, opened in August 1933.

== See also ==
- James McKissack

== Sources ==
- Craig, F. W. S. (1983) [First published 1969]. British parliamentary election results 1918-1949 (3rd ed.). Chichester: Parliamentary Research Services. ISBN 0-900178-06-X.
- Leigh Rayment's Peerage Pages

Parliament of the United Kingdom
Preceded by Edward Rosslyn Mitchell	Member of Parliament for Paisley; 1929–1931	Succeeded by Joseph Maclay
Civic offices
Preceded by John Biggar	Lord Provost of Glasgow; 1943–1945	Succeeded by Hector McNeill
