= Irene Adams =

Scottish politician

The Right Honourable The Baroness Adams of Craigielea

Member of the House of Lords
- Lord Temporal
- Life peerage 28 June 2005

Member of Parliament for Paisley North
- In office 9 November 1990 – 11 April 2005
- Preceded by: Allen Adams
- Succeeded by: Constituency abolished

Personal details
- Born: Katherine Patricia Irene Adams; 27 December 1947 (age 78)
- Party: Labour
- Spouse: Allen Adams (m. 1968; died 1990)

Katherine Patricia Irene Adams, Baroness Adams of Craigielea (born 27 December 1947) is a Scottish Labour peer who served as the Member of Parliament for Paisley North from 1990 to 2005.

== Early life ==
Adams was educated at Stanley Green High School in Paisley, marrying Allen Adams in February 1968 with whom she had three children. In 1970 she was on Paisley Town Council and by 1972 was appointed Justice of the Peace. In 1974, as Katherine Adams, she became a councillor for Stanley Ward of Renfrew District Council, but failed to be reelected in 1977 following a general collapse in the Labour vote. In 1979, she stood for and won the Paisley Craigielea seat on Strathclyde Regional Council succeeding her husband, Allen Adams, who had stepped down from the council following his election as MP. She successfully stood for reelection in 1982, retiring in 1986.

== Parliamentary career ==
Her husband, Allen Adams, had been MP for Paisley North until his death on 5 September 1990 at the age of 44 from a brain haemorrhage. Irene, who had served as his secretary during his time as MP, stood in the subsequent by-election and despite a swing to the SNP, went on to win with 44% of the vote. She successfully defended the seat in the next three General Elections.

As an MP, she had been outspoken on the issue of drug abuse and gang violence and received death threats. Media sources speculated that the 1999 torching of her car was as a result of this work. Despite being loyal to the Labour government of the day, Adams was seen as clearly on its left wing including being against the Iraq war, a Eurosceptic and one of the more pro-devolution Scottish Labour members. Within the Labour party, it was alleged that she had been the target of "bad mouthing" by fellow Labour MP Tommy Graham, which lead to Graham's expulsion from the party in 1999.

Adams was persuaded to stand down with the promise of a peerage, in order to allow sitting West Renfrewshire MP Jim Sheridan to be selected to fight in the May 2005 election for the newly merged seat of Paisley and Renfrewshire North. Following the general election, on 13 May 2005 it was announced that she would be created a life peer as Baroness Adams of Craigielea, of Craigielea in the County of Renfrewshire, on 28 June.

=== Peerage and expenses ===
Despite no longer being a member of the House of Commons, Adams along with 13 other MPs was the subject of a court case over the release of information into parliamentary expenses. As a result of the widespread expenses scandal within parliament, she was ultimately asked pay over £50,000 which she initially refused to do.

Adams is not noted for being an active member of the House of Lords, and attracted criticism for claiming expenses despite having only made a single contribution, her maiden speech, between May 2005 and October 2010. She currently lives in a converted mill in Paisley.

Parliament of the United Kingdom
Preceded by Allen Adams	Member of Parliament for Paisley North; 1990 – 2005	Constituency abolished
