= 1920 Paisley by-election =

UK parliamentary by-election

- 12 February 1920 (Polling); 25 February 1920 (Declaration)
- Registered: 39,235
- Turnout: 77.6%
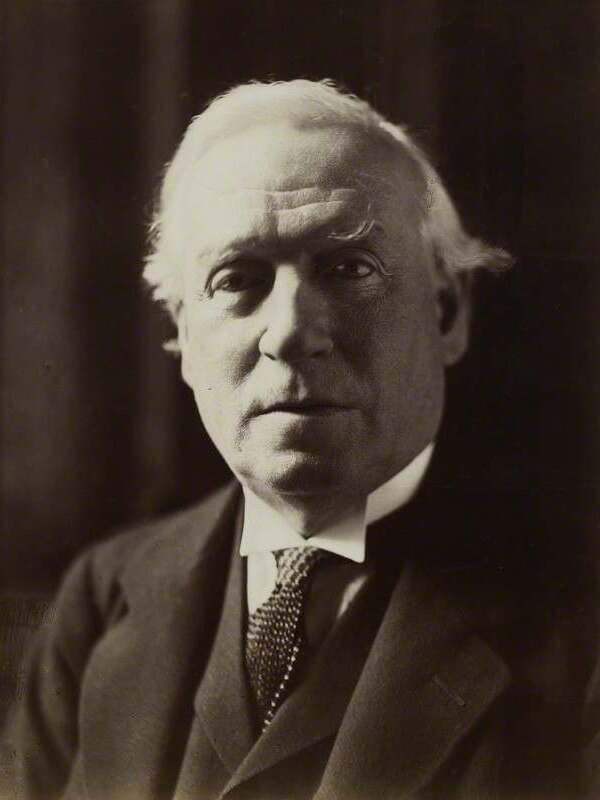

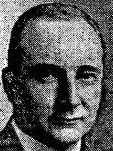
			Uni
Candidate	H. H. Asquith	John Biggar	James MacKean
Party	Liberal	Co-operative Party	Unionist
Alliance		Labour	Coalition
Popular vote	14,736	11,902	3,795
Percentage	48.4%	39.1%	12.5%
Swing	▲14.4%	▲5.6%	New
MP before election
John McCallum
Liberal
Subsequent MP
H. H. Asquith
Liberal

The 1920 Paisley by-election was a parliamentary by-election held on 12 February 1920 for the UK House of Commons constituency of Paisley in Scotland. It was triggered by the death of the constituency's sitting Liberal Member of Parliament Sir John Mills McCallum. Former UK Prime Minister H. H. Asquith, who was still Leader of the Liberal Party but who had lost his seat at the 1918 general election, returned to Parliament following this by-election.

== Background ==
=== Electoral history ===
The result at the last General Election in 1918 was;

General election 1918: Paisley
Party		Candidate	Votes	%	±%
	Liberal	John McCallum	7,542	34.0	–30.3
	Co-operative Party (Labour)	John Biggar	7,436	33.5	New
C	National Democratic	John Taylor	7,201	32.5	New
Majority			106	0.5	–28.1
Turnout			22,179	57.6	–17.3
Registered electors			38,508		
	Liberal hold		Swing		
C indicates candidate endorsed by the coalition government.

=== Asquith's return ===
The by-election provided an opportunity for the return to Parliament of H. H. Asquith, the former Prime Minister who had lost his East Fife seat to the Unionists at the 1918 general election in the aftermath of the split in the Liberal Party over David Lloyd George's coalition with the Conservatives. Asquith remained party leader, and the opponents of the coalition came to be known as the Independent Liberals, or unofficially as the ‘Wee Frees’ after a Scottish religious sect of that name.

== Candidates ==
=== Liberal ===
- H. H. Asquith, Leader of the Liberal Party, former Prime Minister of the United Kingdom and Member for East Fife (1886–1918)

=== Co-operative ===
- John Biggar, member of Glasgow School Board, Chartered accountant and candidate for this seat in 1918

=== Unionist ===
- James MacKean, manufacturer

== Campaign ==
Initially, it was widely expected that Biggar (Co-Operative Party, ie. Labour), who had nearly won the seat in 1918 and who was endorsed by nine former Liberal MPs, would win. The Liberal Party in the constituency was split between supporters of Asquith and Lloyd George, and Asquith, whose continued leadership of the Liberal Party was being much criticised, was only narrowly selected as candidate, although after his formal adoption on 21 January 1920 the local Liberal Association united behind him. He initially had misgivings about returning to Scotland and risking his career, but grew more confident as the campaign progressed.

Asquith had been an opponent of women’s suffrage (women over thirty were given the vote under the Representation of the People Act 1918), and (30 January 1920) thought women voters “hopelessly ignorant, credulous to the last degree, and flickering with gusts of sentiment like a candle in the wind. Then there are some thousands of Irish, who have been ordered by their bosses to vote Labour – as if Labour had ever done or was ever likely to do anything for them”. Asquith directed most of his campaign not against Biggar but against Taylor, the Coalition candidate, whom he thought “a foul-mouthed Tory”.

He condemned the Treaty of Versailles and called for moderation over German reparations, immediate Dominion Status for Ireland (where the Irish War of Independence was currently in progress) and warned of the danger of tariffs being erected, especially by the newly independent small states of Central and Eastern Europe.

Sir John Simon and Lord Buckmaster spoke in Asquith's support, as did his daughter Violet who had become an excellent speaker.

== Result ==
The by-election seemed to be a triumph for the Independent Liberals with a majority of 2,834 votes over Biggar and in blow for the government, the “foul-mouthed Tory” lost his deposit (by ten votes), to Asquith’s delight.

Paisley by-election, 1920
Party		Candidate	Votes	%	±%
	Liberal	H. H. Asquith	14,736	48.4	+14.4
	Co-operative Party (Labour)	John Biggar	11,902	39.1	+5.6
C	Unionist	James MacKean	3,795	12.5	New
Majority			2,834	9.3	+8.8
Turnout			30,433	77.6	+20.0
Registered electors			39,235		+727
	Liberal hold		Swing	+4.4	
C indicates candidate endorsed by the coalition government.

== Aftermath ==
At the following General Election in 1922, Asquith held the seat narrowly, with a much reduced majority (albeit a slightly larger share of the vote) in a two-horse race against Labour.

Asquith held the seat again at the 1923 election but was defeated by Labour at the 1924 election. He was then elevated to the House of Lords as Earl of Oxford and Asquith.

Political biographer John Campbell noted parallels between Asquith's Paisley campaign condemning Lloyd George's opportunism and the Paris Peace Conference to William Ewart Gladstone's Midlothian campaign condemning Benjamin Disraeli and Congress of Berlin. Such comparisons were made at the time, although Asquith himself was more circumspect.
