= 1961 Paisley by-election =

UK parliamentary by-election

The 1961 Paisley by-election was a parliamentary by-election held on 20 April 1961 for the British House of Commons constituency of Paisley in Scotland.

The election was caused by the appointment of the sitting Labour member Douglas Harold Johnston as a Senator of the College of Justice, a judicial post. The candidates were John Robertson for the Labour Party, John Bannerman for the Liberals and G R Rickman for the Conservatives. Robertson held the seat for Labour with a reduced majority of 1,658 from the Liberal candidate.

== Result ==
Paisley by-election, 1961
Party	Candidate	Votes	%	±%
Labour	John Robertson	19,200	45.35	−11.95
Liberal	John Bannerman	17,542	41.43	New
Unionist	Geoffrey R. Rickman	5,597	13.22	−29.48
Majority		1,658	3.92	−10.69
Turnout		42,339	68.10	−10.78
Labour hold		Swing	-26.7	
