= Transparency Task Force =

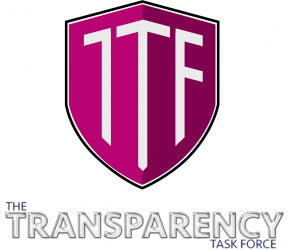
- Abbreviation: TTF
- Established: July 2015
- Founder: Andy Agathangelou
- Type: Social Enterprise
- Purpose: To help consumers of financial services and products to get a fair deal; and in so doing to help rebuild trust and confidence in the financial services sector
- Headquarters: 45 Creech View, Denmead, Waterlooville, Hants, United Kingdom
- Staff: 12
- Volunteers: 2,650
- Website: www.transparencytaskforce.org

The Transparency Task Force or 'TTF' is the collaborative, campaigning community, dedicated to driving up the levels of transparency in the global financial services industry and to rid the financial industry of its short term profit mindset.

The TTF was founded in 2015 by former financial industry insider turned campaigner Andy Agathangelou who claims to have witnessed numerous things that led him to believe the industry is "pre-disposed to misbehave if it's given the chance".

== Mission ==
The overall mission of the Transparency Task Force is to help consumers of financial services and products to get a fair deal; and in so doing to help rebuild trust and confidence in the financial services sector.

== Successes ==
Following parliamentary hearings and meetings with United Kingdom Prime Minister Boris Johnson, TTF was appointed as the Secretariat of the All Party Parliamentary Group on Pensions Scams.

== Publications ==
- Why We Must Rebuild Trustworthiness and Confidence in Financial Services; and How We Can Do It.
