= 1891 Paisley by-election =

UK parliamentary by-election

The 1891 Paisley by-election was a parliamentary by-election held on 1 June 1891 for the British House of Commons constituency of Paisley in Scotland. It was caused by the death of the constituency's sitting Liberal Member of Parliament William Boyle Barbour who had held the seat since the 1885 general election.

== Result ==
The seat was held for the Liberals by William Dunn, a Paisley born, self-made, merchant banker.

William Dunn

Paisley by-election, 1891
Party	Candidate	Votes	%	±%
Liberal	William Dunn	4,145	59.6	+4.5
Conservative	Robert Mure McKerrell	2,807	40.4	−4.5
Majority		1,338	19.2	+9.0
Turnout		6,952	85.8	+4.1
Liberal hold		Swing	+4.5	
