= 1884 Paisley by-election =

UK parliamentary by-election

The 1884 Paisley by-election was a parliamentary by-election held on 15 February 1884 for the British House of Commons constituency of Paisley in Scotland. It was caused by the resignation of the constituency's sitting Liberal Member of Parliament William Holms who had held the seat since the general election of 1880 when he was returned unopposed.

== Result ==
The seat was held for the Liberals by Stewart Clark, a local thread manufacturer.

Paisley by-election, 1884: Paisley
Party	Candidate	Votes	%	±%
Liberal	Stewart Clark	3,049	62.8	N/A
Conservative	Lord Ernest Hamilton	1,806	37.2	New
Majority		1,243	25.6	N/A
Turnout		4,855	85.4	N/A
Liberal hold		Swing	N/A	
