= Joseph Maclay =

Joseph Maclay may refer to:

- Joseph Maclay, 1st Baron Maclay, Scottish businessman and public servant
- Joseph Maclay, 2nd Baron Maclay, Scottish banker, shipowner, peer and politician
