= Antonio Rossetti =

Italian sculptor

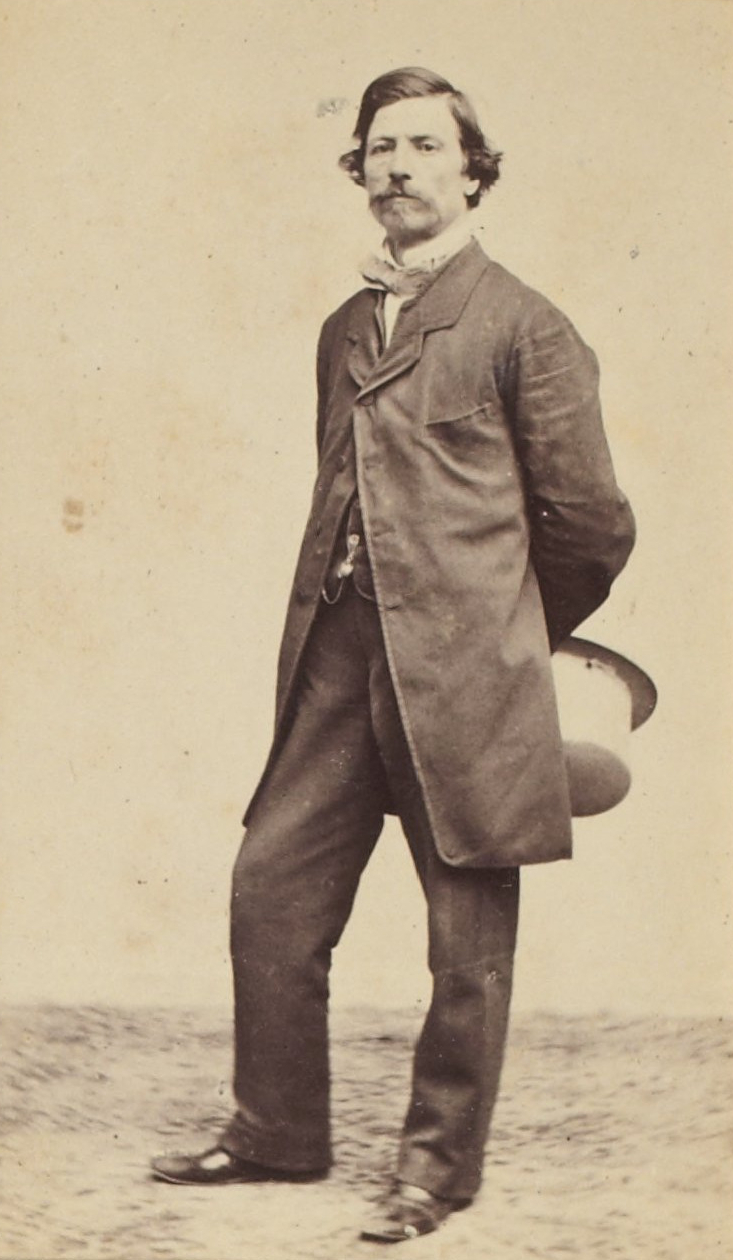
Photographic portrait of Rossetti by Antonio Mariannecci (n.d.)

Antonio Rossetti or Rosetti (1819–1889) was an Italian sculptor of nudes and figures.

== Life ==
Antonio Rossetti was born in Milan on 31 October 1819. He studied first in Milan with Francesco Somaini, and from 1844 in Rome.

Rossetti moved to Rome in 1843, and worked there until the end of his life. He was a hard and meticulous worker who created numerous sculptures in line with contemporary tastes, which he sold to the rich, earning him a considerable fortune. His sensual marble figures and groups were especially popular with foreign visitors.

He died in Rome in 1889, although at least one source gives the earlier date of September 1876.

== Works ==
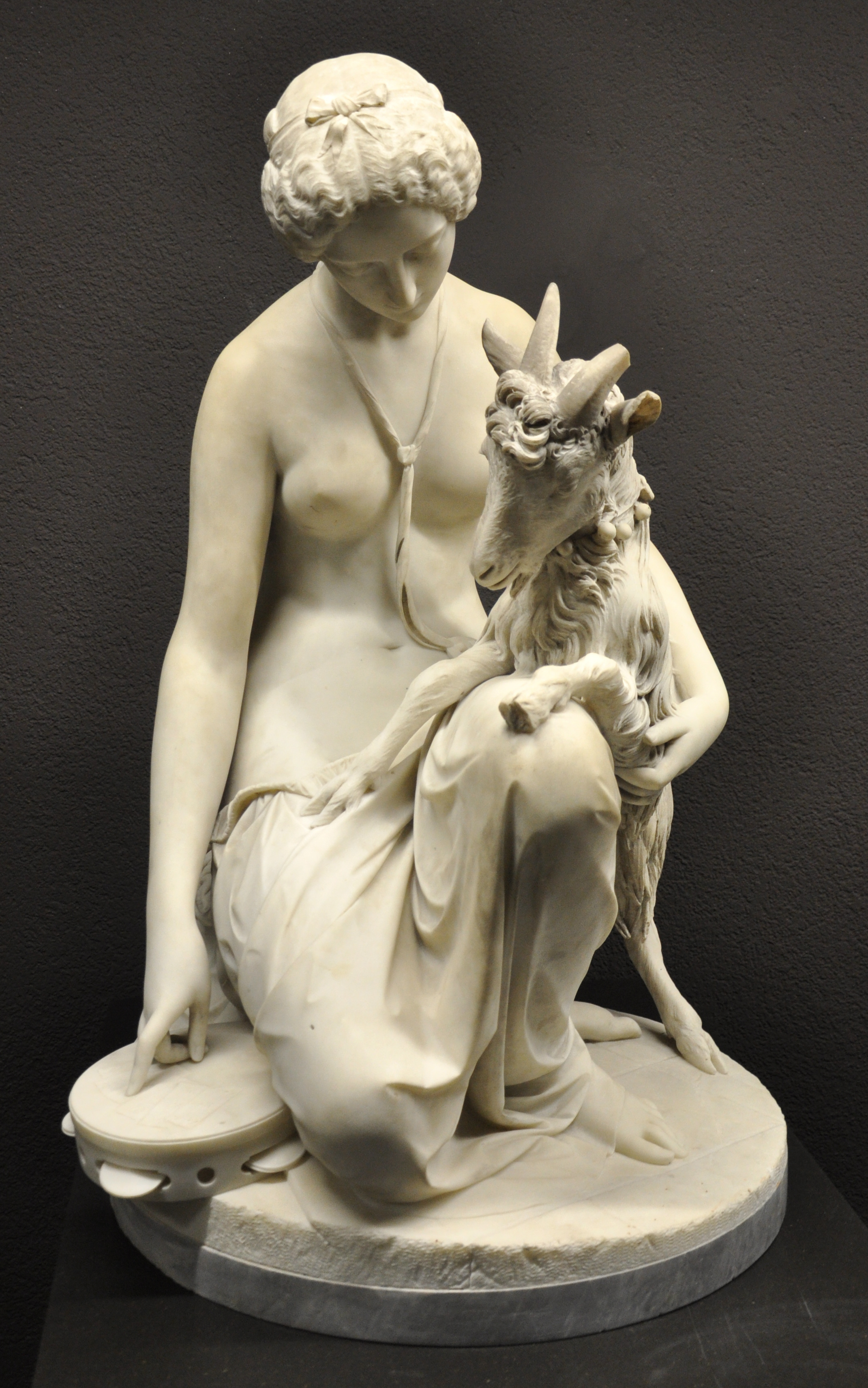
Esmeralda with the goat, in the Liebieghaus, Frankfurt (n.d.)

In 1849, Rossetti painted the bust of Volta for the ascent to the Pincian Hill. He created genre statuettes, nudes, portraits and funerary monuments.

== Exhibitions ==
He exhibited in Rome in 1879: Ritratto di D. Marino Torlonia ('Portrait of D. Marino Torlonia'), L'Estate ('Summer'), Psiche ('Psyche'), Amore ('Love'), La tentazione di una Vestale ('The Temptation of a Vestal'), and again in 1887. In 1877 he exhibited in Liverpool, and in 1888 he exhibited in London: Garibaldi, Mercante d'amore ('Merchant of Love'), Ingenua ('Ingénue'), Ofelia ('Ophelia'), and Amore segreto ('Secret Love').

== Collections ==
- Hermitage Museum: Esmeralda (1856);
- Glasgow Museums: The Nubian Slave (after 1858, marble);
- McLean Museum and Art Gallery: The Flight from Pompeii (1878, marble).
