= List of listed buildings in Inverclyde =

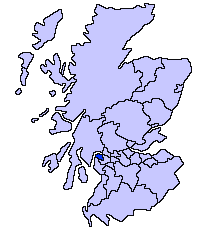
Inverclyde shown within Scotland

This is a list of listed buildings in Inverclyde. The list is split out by parish.

- List of listed buildings in Gourock, Inverclyde
- List of listed buildings in Greenock
- List of listed buildings in Inverkip, Inverclyde
- List of listed buildings in Kilmacolm, Inverclyde
- List of listed buildings in Port Glasgow, Inverclyde

== See also ==
- Scheduled monuments in Inverclyde
