= Clune Park Estate =

Housing estate in Inverclyde, Scotland

- Housing estate
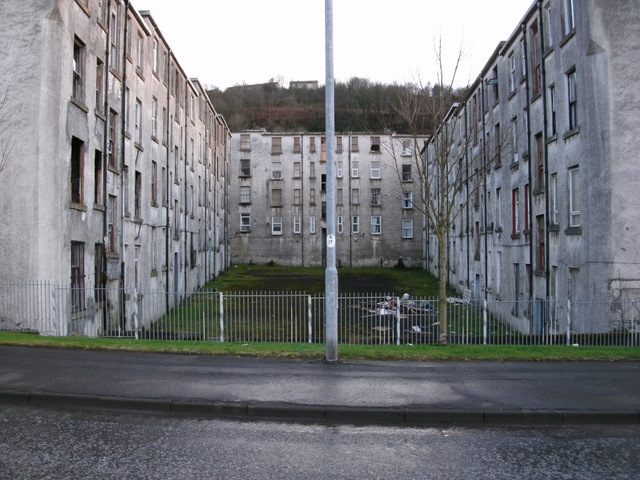
- The abandoned tenements at Clune Park Estate
- Interactive map of Clune Park Estate
- Coordinates: 55.9321°N 4.6739°W
- Sovereign state: United Kingdom
- Country: Scotland
- Council area: Inverclyde
- Town: Port Glasgow
- Demolished: 2025

The Clune Park Estate was a housing estate in the town of Port Glasgow, Inverclyde, Scotland. consisting of around 430 residential properties across 45 tenement blocks in total. Constructed in the early 20th century, the estate fell into disrepair and was dubbed "Scotland's Chernobyl" before its scheduled demolition in 2025.

== History ==
The estate was built after World War I by shipbuilding company Lithgows to house its workforce. The estate thrived in the 1920s.

Clune Park Estate was once considered the cheapest property in Great Britain when one flat sold for £7,000 at auction. The estate became largely abandoned by the 1990s.

The estate was inhabited until 2020. It was a site of urban exploration for many years. By 2022, there were 20 residents left.

In November 2023, Inverclyde Council approved a redevelopment plan. By 2024, just five residents remained. On 11 April 2025, work began on the demolition of the estate. Contractors will demolish the listed former school and former church before moving to 138 properties across the 15 tenement blocks. The work is expected to take six months.

== Gallery ==
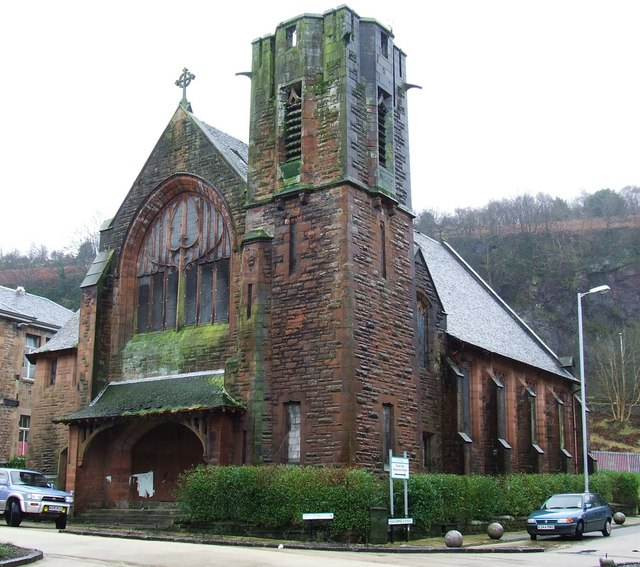
Clune Park Church

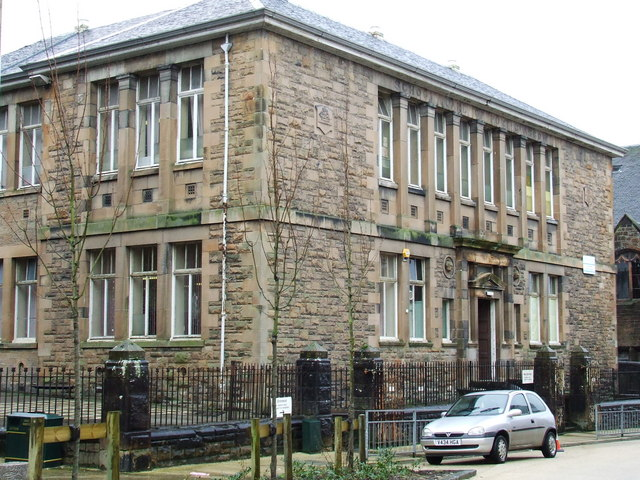
Clune Park Primary School

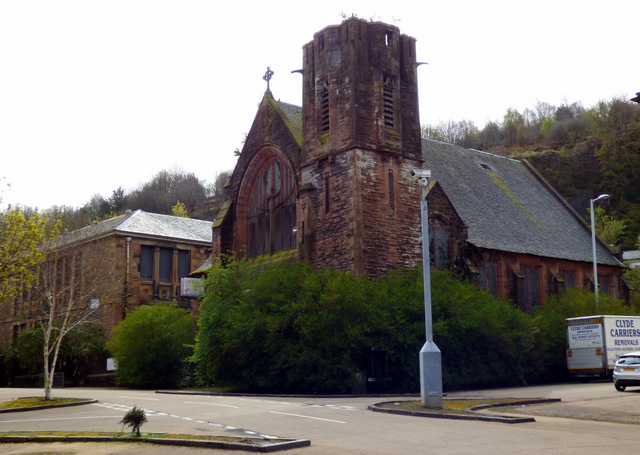
The school (left) and church (right)

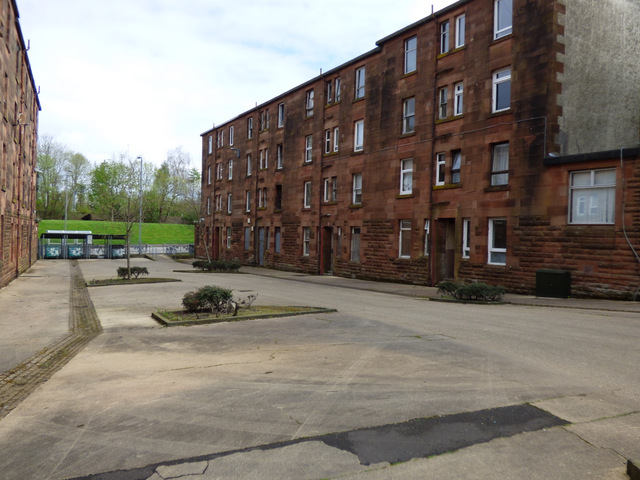
Bruce Street

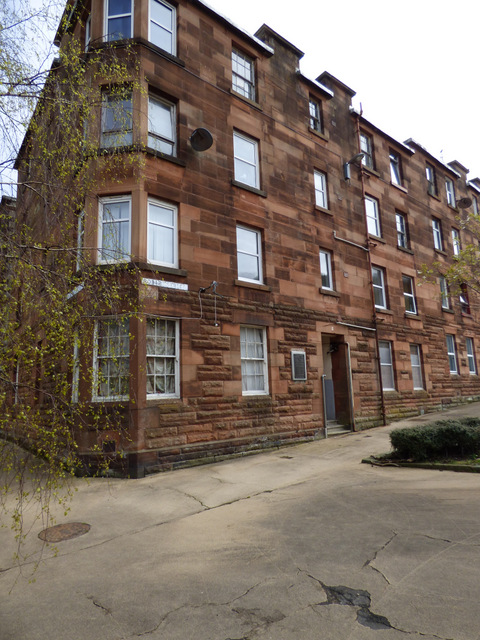
Caledonia Street

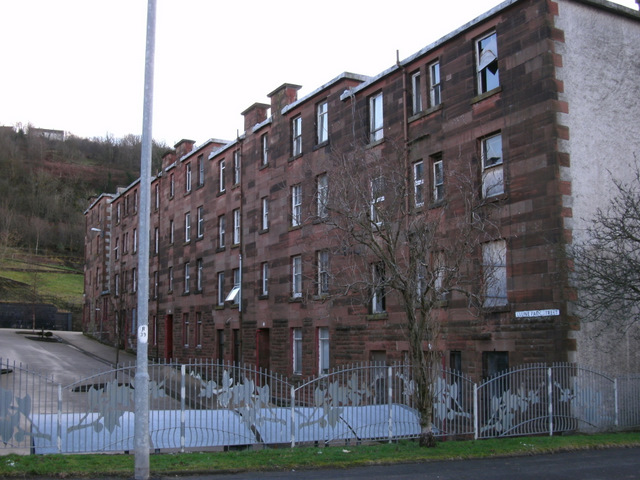
Clune Park Street (uphill)

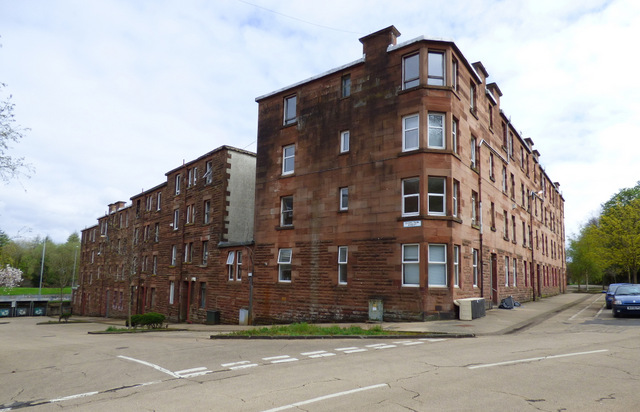
Clune Park Street (corner)

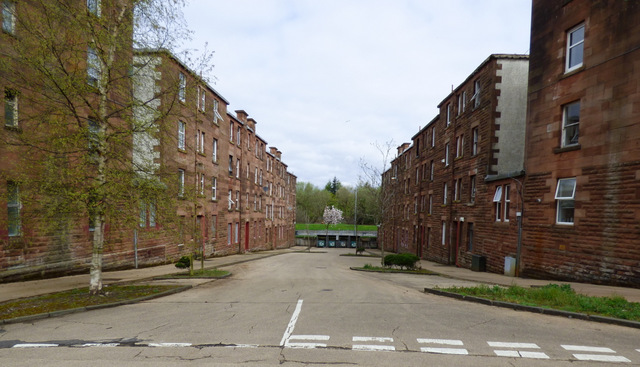
Clune Park Street (downhill)

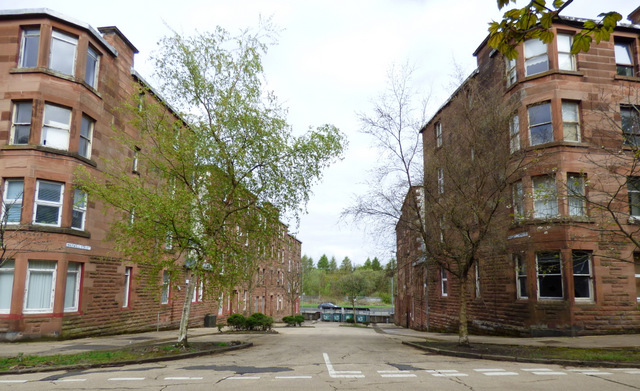
Maxwell Street

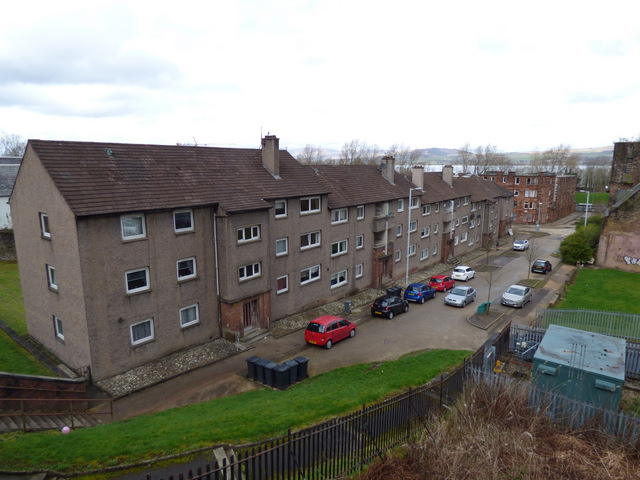
Montgomerie Street

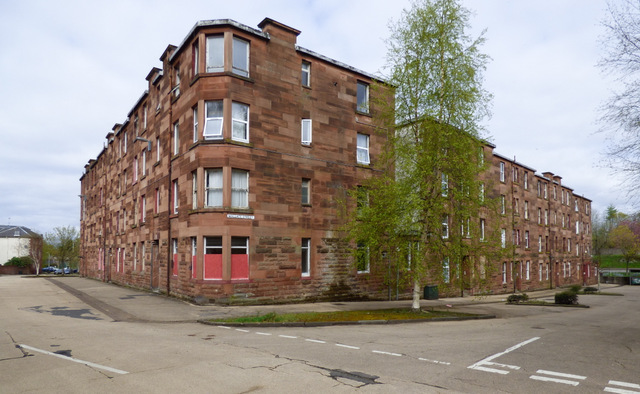
Wallace Street

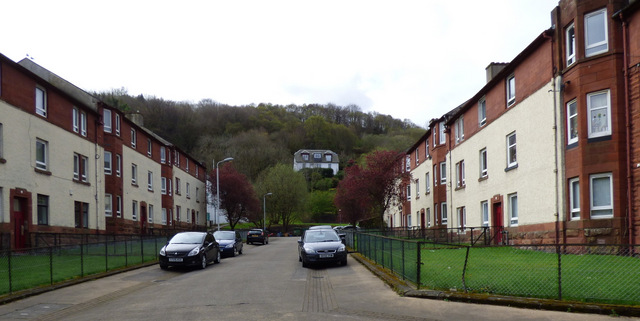
Wilson Street

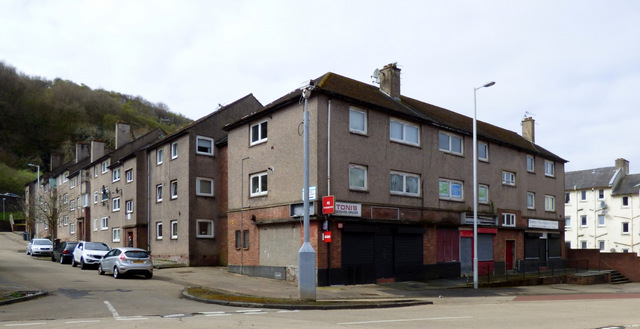
Robert Street (shops)

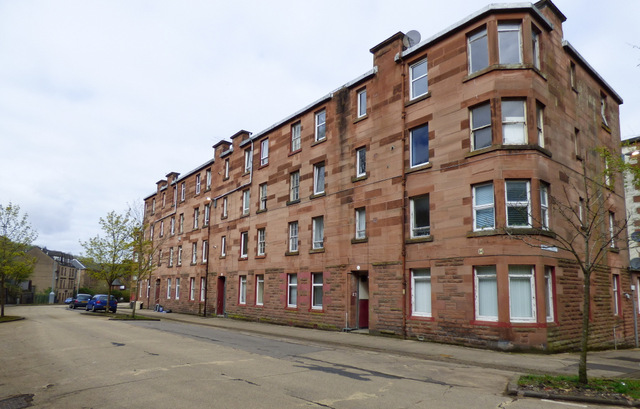
Robert Street

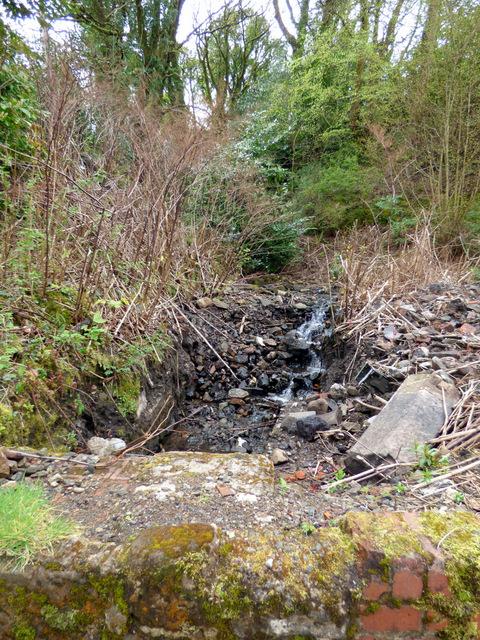
Stream at Robert Street

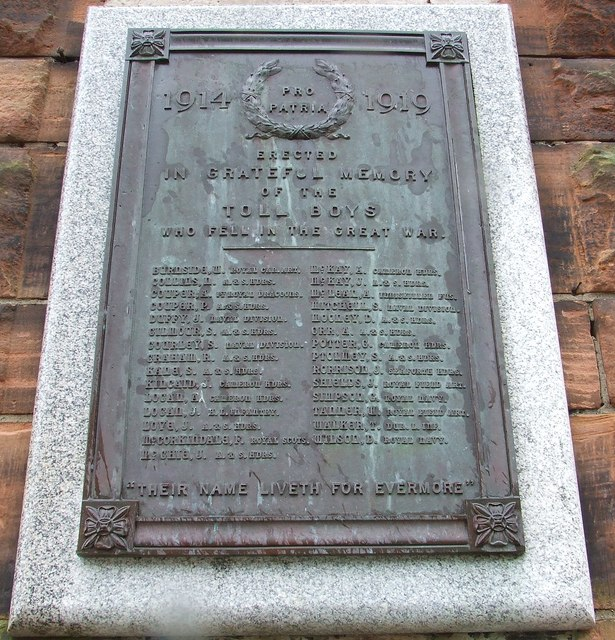
WWI Memorial

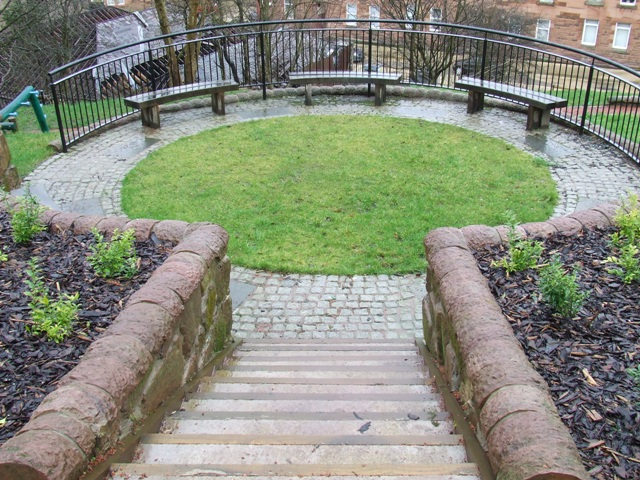
Compass viewpoint

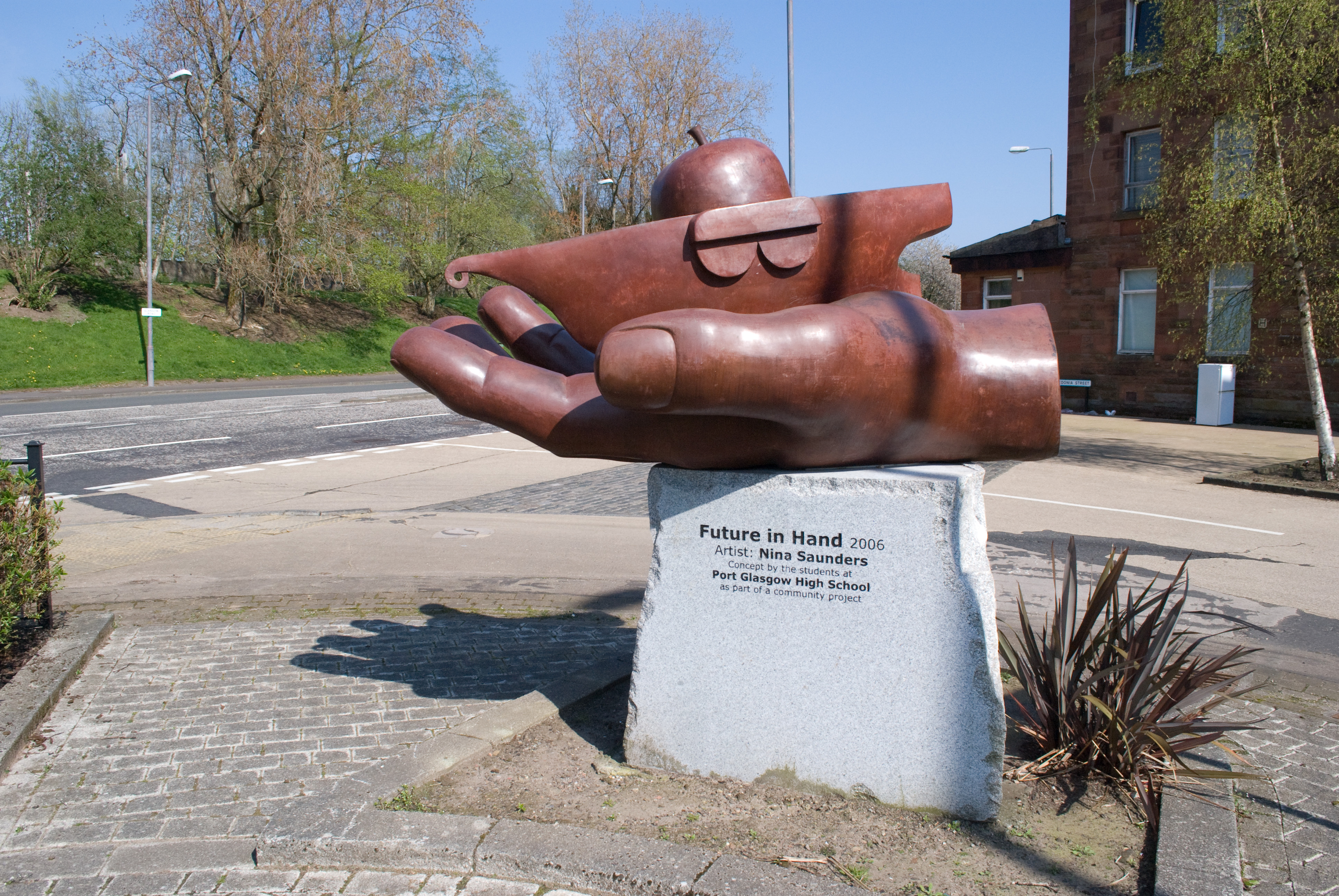
Future In Hand sculpture

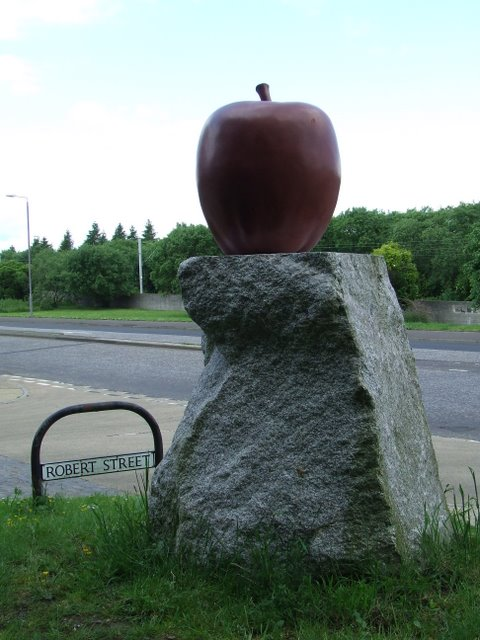
Apple sculpture

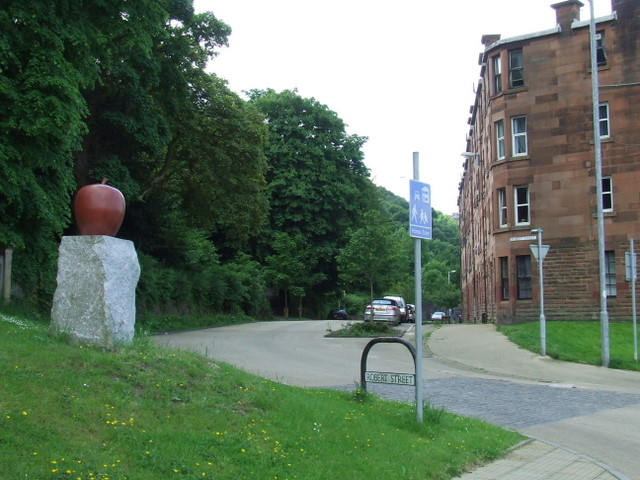
Apple sculpture at Robert Street
