= List of listed buildings in Port Glasgow, Inverclyde =

This is a list of listed buildings in the parish of Port Glasgow in Inverclyde, Scotland.

== List ==
Name	Location	Date Listed	Grid Ref. (Note: Sometimes known as OSGB36, the grid reference (where provided) is based on the British national grid reference system used by the Ordnance Survey. • "Guide to National Grid". Ordnance Survey. • "Get-a-map". Ordnance Survey.)	Geo-coordinates	Notes	LB Number (Note: Historic Environment Scotland assign a unique alphanumeric identifier to each designated site in Scotland, for listed buildings this always begins with "LB", for example "LB12345".)	Image
Former Clune Park Church Of Scotland, Robert Street				55°55′54″N 4°40′32″W	Category B	40072	Upload another image
School Court, Former Jean Street School, Jean Street And HighHolm Street				55°56′03″N 4°41′44″W	Category B	40075	Upload another image
6 And 8 Newark Street				55°55′56″N 4°40′46″W	Category B	40077	Upload another image
Newark Castle, Castle Street				55°56′04″N 4°40′41″W	Category A	40069	Upload another image See more images
Fore Street, Former Municipal Buildings				55°56′05″N 4°41′15″W	Category A	40071	Upload another image
Princes Street 49 And 65 Church Street Port Glasgow Royal Bank Building				55°56′03″N 4°41′26″W	Category B	40081	Upload another image
Port Glasgow Harbour, Warehouses On West Quay				55°56′11″N 4°41′20″W	Category C(S)	40087	Upload another image
Former Newark Parish Church, Glen Avenue. (Halls Excluded)				55°56′01″N 4°41′37″W	Category B	40074	Upload another image See more images
St Andrew's Church, Church Street,(West End),(Former Old Parish Church)				55°56′03″N 4°41′27″W	Category B	40070	Upload another image
Clune Park Primary School, Robert Street				55°55′53″N 4°40′31″W	Category B	40073	Upload another image See more images
King George V1 Club, (Old Peoples' Welfare Council) 9-11 1/2 King Street				55°56′02″N 4°41′20″W	Category B	40076	Upload another image
Parkhill Farm House, Old Greenock Road				55°55′38″N 4°38′04″W	Category B	40079	Upload another image
Port Glasgow Harbour, West Quay				55°56′12″N 4°41′20″W	Category B	40084	Upload another image
Port Glasgow Harbour, Lighthouse Opposite Warehouse On West Quay				55°56′15″N 4°41′15″W	Category B	40086	Upload another image
Bay Street/Robert Street, Gourock Ropeworks				55°56′01″N 4°40′55″W	Category A	40067	Upload another image See more images
Former West Church Of Scotland, Brown St				55°56′06″N 4°41′45″W	Category B	40068	Upload another image See more images
2 Parkhill Avenue, Holy Family Roman Catholic Church And Presbytery				55°55′43″N 4°39′31″W	Category A	40088	Upload another image
Broadfield Hospital, Broadstone House, (Mental Home) Old Greenock Road				55°55′42″N 4°38′36″W	Ruin	40078	Upload another image
Port Glasgow Harbour, Leading Light On West Quay				55°56′15″N 4°41′26″W	Category B	40085	Upload another image
Glenpark Drive, Glenpark House				55°56′03″N 4°42′05″W	Category C(S)	46409	Upload another image
Jean Street, Railway Bridge, Bridge Gou/29				55°56′05″N 4°41′46″W	Category C(S)	50127	Upload another image

== Key ==
The scheme for classifying buildings in Scotland is:

- Category A: "buildings of national or international importance, either architectural or historic; or fine, little-altered examples of some particular period, style or building type."
- Category B: "buildings of regional or more than local importance; or major examples of some particular period, style or building type, which may have been altered."
- Category C: "buildings of local importance; lesser examples of any period, style, or building type, as originally constructed or moderately altered; and simple traditional buildings which group well with other listed buildings."

In March 2016 there were 47,288 listed buildings in Scotland. Of these, 8% were Category A, and 50% were Category B, with the remaining 42% being Category C.

== See also ==
- List of listed buildings in Inverclyde
