= List of listed buildings in Kilmacolm, Inverclyde =

This is a list of listed buildings in the parish of Kilmacolm in Inverclyde, Scotland.

== List ==
Name	Location	Date Listed	Grid Ref. (Note: Sometimes known as OSGB36, the grid reference (where provided) is based on the British national grid reference system used by the Ordnance Survey. • "Guide to National Grid". Ordnance Survey. • "Get-a-map". Ordnance Survey.)	Geo-coordinates	Notes	LB Number (Note: Historic Environment Scotland assign a unique alphanumeric identifier to each designated site in Scotland, for listed buildings this always begins with "LB", for example "LB12345".)	Image
Finlaystone House, Port Glasgow Road, By Langbank				55°55′43″N 4°37′09″W	Category A	13641	Upload another image
Balrossie With Annex, Ornamental Outbuilding, Ancillary Building, Terraces, Steps, Gatepiers, Gates And Railings				55°53′16″N 4°39′10″W	Category B	49972	Upload Photo
Bridge Of Weir, 28 Quarrier's Village, (Sabbath School Home)				55°52′03″N 4°37′11″W	Category C(S)	50588	Upload another image
Bridge Of Weir Hospital Main Block Including Chapel				55°51′48″N 4°36′48″W	Category B	13232	Upload Photo
"Overton", Glen Road, Kilmacolm				55°53′46″N 4°37′03″W	Category C(S)	12457	Upload Photo
Duchal House, Strathgryfe, By Kilmacolm				55°52′37″N 4°38′01″W	Category A	12463	Upload Photo
Bridge Of Weir, 17 Quarrier's Village, 'Alan Dick Home'				55°52′04″N 4°37′03″W	Category C(S)	50584	Upload Photo
Bridge Of Weir, 34 Quarrier's Village, (Glenfarg)				55°52′03″N 4°36′45″W	Category C(S)	50586	Upload Photo
Kilmacolm Cemetery, Headstone For James Reid				55°54′06″N 4°38′03″W	Category B	51677	Upload Photo
Kilmacolm Parish Church ("Old Kirk"), Main Street, Kilmacolm				55°53′42″N 4°37′37″W	Category B	12447	Upload another image See more images
Kidston Hall, Port Glasgow Road, Kilmacolm				55°53′43″N 4°37′38″W	Category C(S)	12458	Upload another image See more images
Knockbuckle Road, Shallott, St Columba's Junior School With Terrace, Statue, Boundary Wall, Gatepiers And Gates				55°53′32″N 4°38′09″W	Category B	50020	Upload Photo
Quarrier's Village, Faith Avenue, Homelea				55°52′00″N 4°36′59″W	Category C(S)	50021	Upload Photo
The Cross And Lochwinnoch Road, Old Primary School With Boundary Wall				55°53′37″N 4°37′38″W	Category C(S)	50022	Upload another image
Bridge Of Weir, 45 Quarrier's Village, (Bethesda')				55°52′00″N 4°37′02″W	Category C(S)	50585	Upload Photo
Bridge Of Weir, 14 Quarrier's Village, 'Overtoun'				55°52′02″N 4°37′08″W	Category C(S)	50587	Upload Photo
Bridge Of Weir, 48 Quarrier's Village, The Marcus Humphrey House (Former Elise Hospital)				55°52′04″N 4°37′15″W	Category C(S)	50589	Upload Photo
"Windyhill", Rowantreehill Road Kilmacolm				55°53′24″N 4°37′13″W	Category A	12450	Upload another image
Quarrier's Village, Mount Zion Church, Including Cemetery And Boundary Walls				55°52′07″N 4°37′04″W	Category B	48940	Upload another image See more images
St. Columba's (Formerly St. James's) Church Of Scotland Duchal Road, Kilmacolm				55°53′35″N 4°37′37″W	Category A	12448	Upload Photo
"Rowantreehill", Rowantreehill Road, Kilmacolm				55°53′26″N 4°37′15″W	Category B	12449	Upload Photo
"Hazelhope", Gryffe Road, Kilmacolm				55°53′13″N 4°37′24″W	Category C(S)	12454	Upload Photo
Lodge Of Auchenbothie House, Port Glasgow Road, By Kilmacolm				55°54′00″N 4°38′16″W	Category B	12461	Upload Photo
Stable Block With Coachman's Cottage, Etc., At Duchal House				55°52′37″N 4°38′06″W	Category B	12464	Upload Photo
Hope Lodge, ( Originally Lodge To Bridge Of Weir Hospital)				55°51′47″N 4°36′23″W	Category B	13230	Upload Photo
"Greystones", Houston Road, Kilmacolm				55°53′13″N 4°37′01″W	Category B	12453	Upload Photo
"Nether Knockbuckle", Knockbuckle, Kilmacolm				55°53′33″N 4°38′44″W	Category B	12456	Upload Photo
Auchenbothie House, (Former Old Folks Home), Port Glasgow Road, By Kilmacolm				55°54′12″N 4°38′27″W	Category B	12460	Upload another image See more images
"Cloak", (Formerly "Mosside"), Cloak Road, By Kilmacolm				55°54′46″N 4°38′12″W	Category B	12462	Upload Photo
Former R.C. "Bishop's House", (Formerly "Miyanoshta") Porterfield Road, Kilmacolm				55°53′20″N 4°37′12″W	Category B	12451	Upload another image
Craigbet, By Torr Road, Bridge Of Weir				55°51′51″N 4°36′23″W	Category B	13047	Upload Photo
"Knapps House", Houston Road, Kilmacolm				55°53′12″N 4°36′47″W	Category B	12452	Upload Photo
"Den O' Gryffe", Knockbuckle Road, Kilmacolm				55°53′35″N 4°38′51″W	Category B	12455	Upload Photo
"Water Yetts", Finlaystone Road, Kilmacolm				55°54′00″N 4°37′40″W	Category B	12459	Upload Photo
Glencairn Road, Old Church Manse				55°53′34″N 4°37′20″W	Category C(S)	50019	Upload Photo

== Key ==
The scheme for classifying buildings in Scotland is:

- Category A: "buildings of national or international importance, either architectural or historic; or fine, little-altered examples of some particular period, style or building type."
- Category B: "buildings of regional or more than local importance; or major examples of some particular period, style or building type, which may have been altered."
- Category C: "buildings of local importance; lesser examples of any period, style, or building type, as originally constructed or moderately altered; and simple traditional buildings which group well with other listed buildings."

In March 2016 there were 47,288 listed buildings in Scotland. Of these, 8% were Category A, and 50% were Category B, with the remaining 42% being Category C.

== See also ==
- List of listed buildings in Inverclyde
