= Clune Park Church =

Former church in Port Glasgow, Scotland

Clune Park Church of Scotland
- Clune Park Church Of Scotland, Robert Street, Port Glasgow
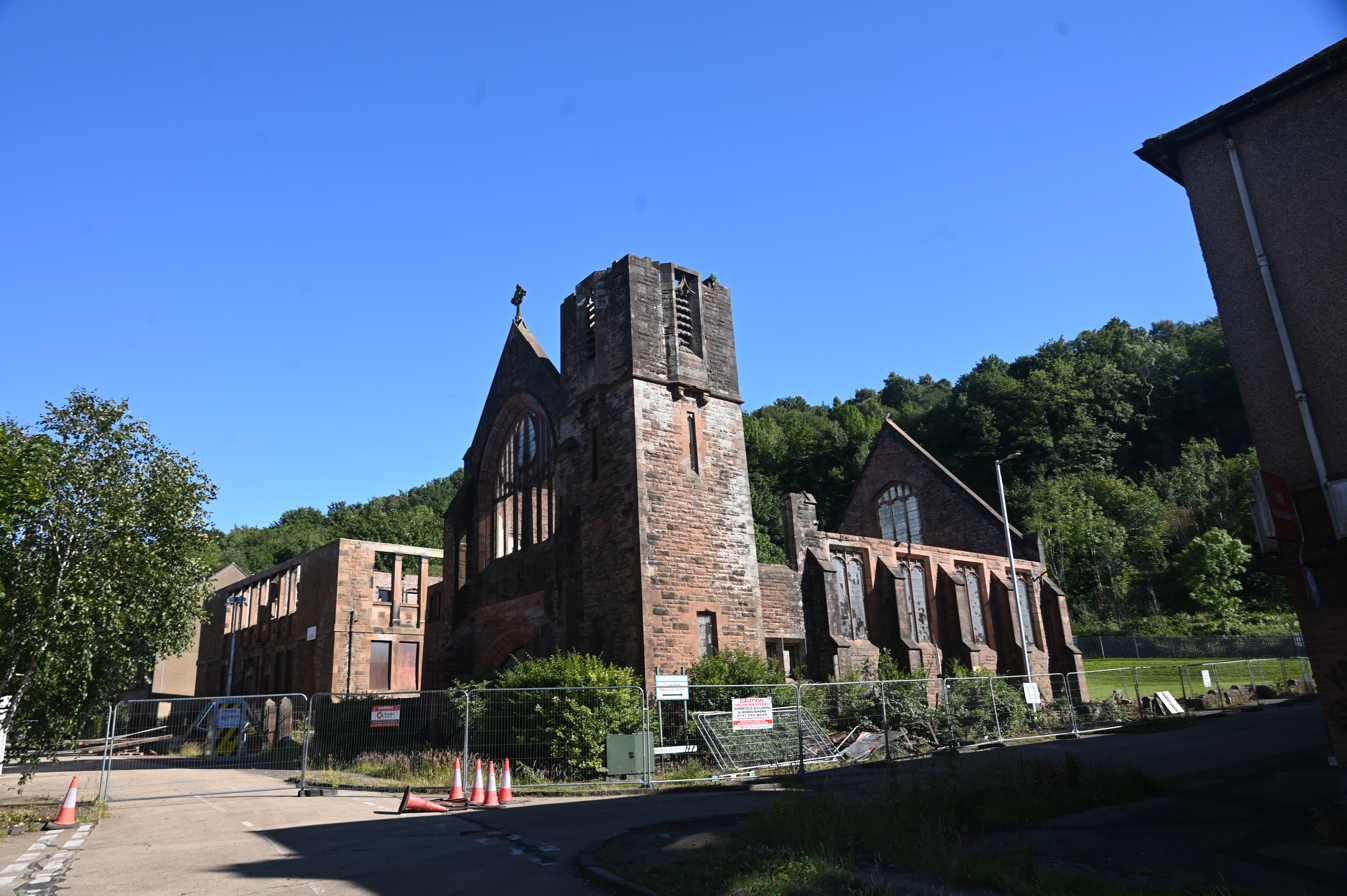
- Clune Park Church in July 2024
- Clune Park Church of Scotland
- 55.9317°N 4.6755°W
- Location: Port Glasgow, Inverclyde
- Country: Scotland

History
- Status: Abandoned

Architecture
- Functional status: Redundant
- Heritage designation: Category B
- Designated: 1979
- Architect: Boston, Menzies and Morton
- Style: Gothic style
- Completed: 1905
- Closed: 1997

Clune Park Church was a church in the town of Port Glasgow, Scotland. It was built in 1905 to serve the Clune Park Estate. It was in use until 1997. Inverclyde Council had plans to regenerate the area, but the future of the church was uncertain for many years. An application for demolition was submitted in 2024. The church was a Category B listed building. It will be demolished in April 2025 alongside the adjacent Clune Park Primary School. On 3 May 2025, two workers were injured during its demolition.

== Gallery ==
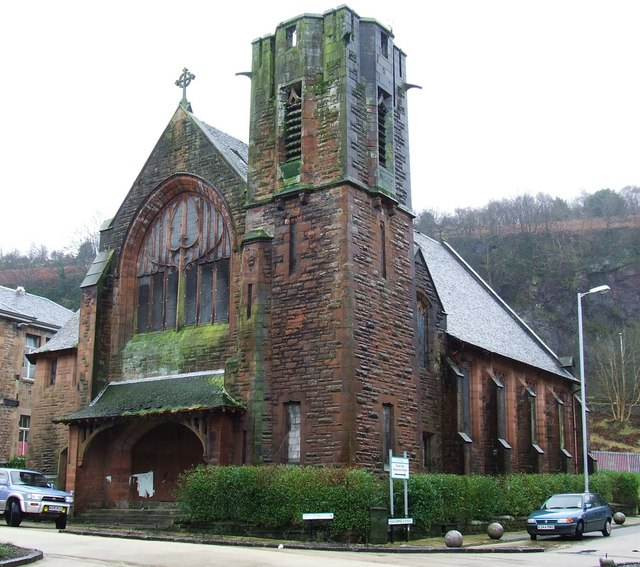
The church in 2007

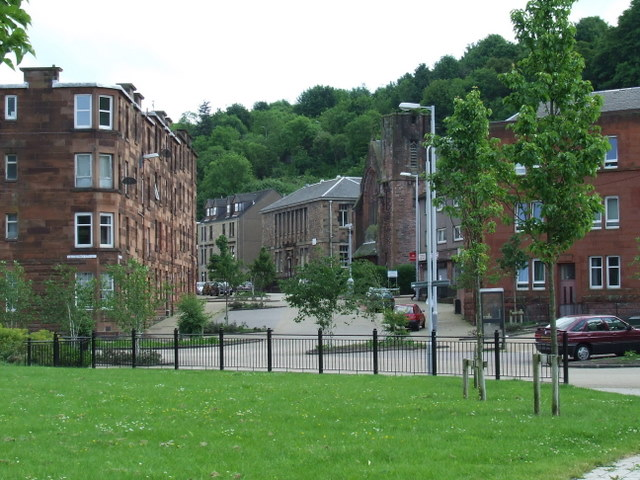
The church and surrounding estate

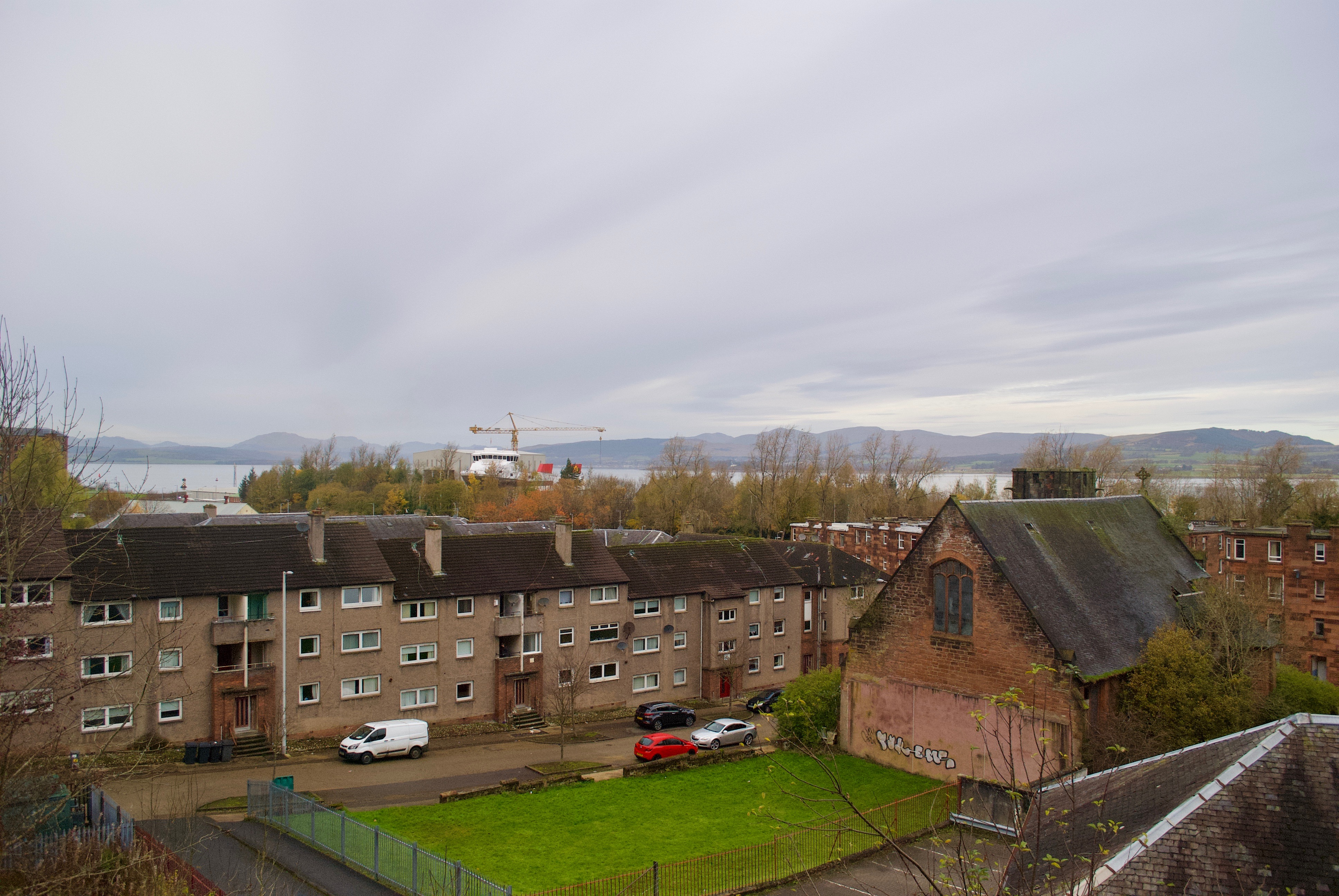
The church and surrounding buildings looking towards Ferguson Marine shipyard

== See also ==
- List of listed buildings in Port Glasgow, Inverclyde
