= Baron Maclay =

Barony in the Peerage of the United Kingdom

Baron Maclay, of Glasgow in the County of Lanark, is a title in the Peerage of the United Kingdom. It was created in 1922 for the Scottish businessman Sir Joseph Maclay, 1st Baronet. He was Chairman of Maclay & Macintyre, shipowners, of Glasgow, and also served as Minister of Shipping in the war-time coalition of David Lloyd George, without being in Parliament. Maclay had already been created a Baronet, of Park Terrace in the City of Glasgow in the County of Lanark, in 1914. His eldest surviving son, the second Baron, represented Paisley in the House of Commons as a Liberal. As of 2025 the titles are held by the latter's grandson, the fourth Baron, who succeeded in 2025.

Another member of the Maclay family was the politician John Maclay, 1st Viscount Muirshiel. He was the fifth son of the first Baron Maclay.

In 1913, the first Lord Maclay purchased Duchal House in Kilmacolm, Inverclyde, which remains the family home to this day. The former Lords Maclay are buried alongside the Viscount Muirshiel in the graveyard of Mount Zion Church in Quarrier's Village.

== Barons Maclay (1922) ==
- Joseph Paton Maclay, 1st Baron Maclay (1857–1951)
- Joseph Paton Maclay, 2nd Baron Maclay (1899–1969)
- Joseph Paton Maclay, 3rd Baron Maclay (1942–2025)
- Joseph Paton Maclay, 4th Baron Maclay (born 1977)

The heir presumptive is the present holder's brother, the Hon. Thomas Maxwell Maclay (born 1981).

== See also ==
- Viscount Muirshiel
