= Municipal Buildings, Gourock =

Municipal building in Gourock, Scotland

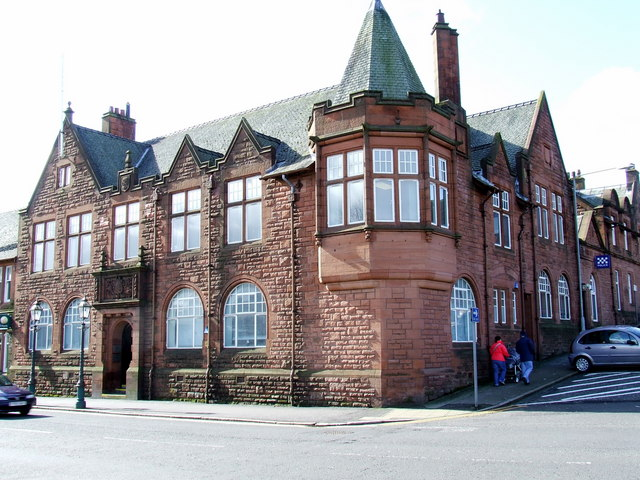
- Municipal Buildings, Gourock

- Shown in Inverclyde
- 55.9610°N 4.8172°W
- Location: Shore Street, Gourock

History
- Built: 1924

Site notes
- Architect(s): Stewart Tough & Alexander
- Architectural style: Scottish baronial style

Listed Building – Category C(S)
- Official name: 116, 118 and 122 Shore Street and 3 and 5 Kempock Place (former Municipal Buildings and Police Station), Gourock
- Designated: 10 September 1979
- Reference no.: LB34024

The Municipal Buildings are based in Shore Street, Gourock, Inverclyde, Scotland. The structure, which is used as a business centre, is a Category C listed building.

== History ==
Following significant population growth, largely associated with the status of Gourock as a fishing port, the area became a police burgh in 1858: the burgh commissioners initially established their offices in Shore Street. In the early 20th century the commissioners decided to procure purpose-built municipal chambers for the burgh: the site they selected was further north along Shore Street.

In 1914, the commissioners launched a design competition for the new building for which one of the most elaborate designs, involving a tall clock tower and a vaulted council chamber, was submitted by Alexander Nisbet Paterson. The architectural firm selected was Stewart Tough & Alexander but work on site was delayed by the First World War and construction work only started in the early 1920s.

The new building was designed in the Scottish Baronial style, built in red sandstone rubble masonry with ashlar dressings and was completed in 1924. The design involved an asymmetrical main frontage with five bays facing onto Shore Street; the central bay featured, on the ground floor, a deeply recessed doorway with a cavetto-surround supporting a panel with a carved coat of arms; there was a cross-window on the first floor and a date stone above. The other bays were fenestrated with Diocletian windows on the ground floor and cross-windows on the first floor. There was a gable containing a small two-part window above the first two bays on the left and a short corbeled and castellated tower with a hexagonal roof on the corner to the right. Internally, the principal room was the council chamber, which was wood panelled.

The municipal buildings ceased to be local seat of government when the enlarged Inverclyde District Council was formed in 1975. However, the structure continued to be a centre for the delivery of local services. The building was then transferred to a public private partnership, known as Riverside Inverclyde, which was established by Inverclyde Council and Scottish Enterprise in 2013. An extensive programme of refurbishment works, which involved the restoration of stained glass windows on the staircase as well as preservation of the wood panelling in the council chamber, was undertaken to a design by Richard Robb Architects at a cost of £600,000 and was completed in November 2016. The building was then reopened with a dental practice on the ground floor, and several commercial businesses and a local heritage centre on the first floor.

== See also ==
- List of listed buildings in Gourock, Inverclyde
