= Clune Park Primary School =

School building in Inverclyde, Scotland

Coordinates: 55.9315°N 4.6752°W

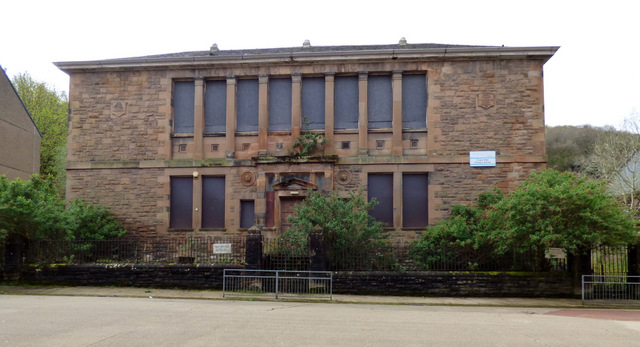
Former Clune Park Primary School in 2017

The Clune Park Primary School was a historic building in the Clune Park Estate area of Port Glasgow, Inverclyde, Scotland. It was a Category B listed building.

== History ==
The school closed in 2008. The building fell into a state of disrepair.

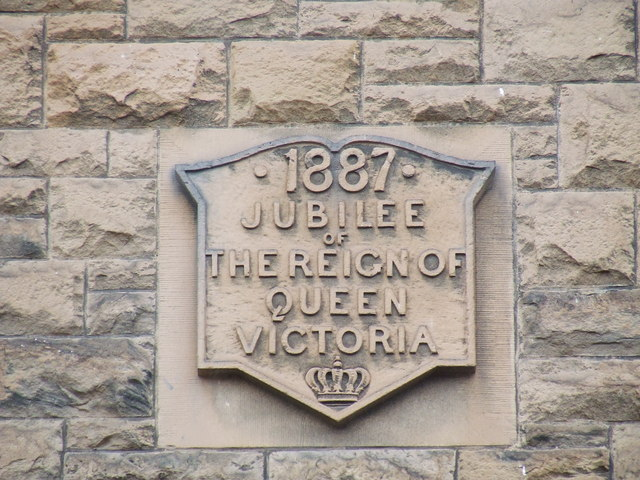
Queen Victoria jubilee date stone at the school

In August 2023, the school was destroyed by fire. The council initially intended to retain the school. The entire estate was later condemned.

In 2025, the school will be demolished alongside the Clune Park Church and the rest of the Clune Park Estate.

== See also ==
- List of listed buildings in Port Glasgow, Inverclyde
