= List of listed buildings in Gourock, Inverclyde =

This is a list of listed buildings in the parish of Gourock in Inverclyde, Scotland.

== List ==
Name	Location	Date Listed	Grid Ref. (Note: Sometimes known as OSGB36, the grid reference (where provided) is based on the British national grid reference system used by the Ordnance Survey. • "Guide to National Grid". Ordnance Survey. • "Get-a-map". Ordnance Survey.)	Geo-coordinates	Notes	LB Number (Note: Historic Environment Scotland assign a unique alphanumeric identifier to each designated site in Scotland, for listed buildings this always begins with "LB", for example "LB12345".)	Image
10-16 (Even Nos) Steel Street				55°57′24″N 4°48′20″W	Category C(S)	34027	Upload Photo
45 Victoria Road With Terracing Walls And Railings				55°57′15″N 4°49′59″W	Category C(S)	34032	Upload Photo
46-52 (Even Nos) Albert Road With Boundary Wall And Gatepiers				55°57′33″N 4°49′24″W	Category B	33981	Upload Photo
80,82 And 84 Albert Road				55°57′30″N 4°49′30″W	Category B	33983	Upload Photo
2-12 (Even Nos) Ashgrove Avenue, Viewfield				55°57′14″N 4°50′02″W	Category C(S)	33989	Upload Photo
21 And 22 Ashton Road				55°57′17″N 4°50′01″W	Category C(S)	33993	Upload Photo
50 Ashton Road With Boundary Wall And Gatepiers				55°57′14″N 4°50′14″W	Category B	33997	Upload Photo
25 And 27 Kempock Place				55°57′42″N 4°49′06″W	Category C(S)	34016	Upload Photo
Royal Street, Old Gourock And Ashton Parish Church With Boundary Walls, Gatepiers And Railings				55°57′31″N 4°48′59″W	Category B	34021	Upload Photo
Shore Street, Gamble Institute				55°57′27″N 4°48′51″W	Category B	34023	Upload Photo
88, 89 And 90 Shore Street And 2 And 4 John Street				55°57′34″N 4°49′00″W	Category C(S)	34025	Upload Photo
8 And 10 Victoria Road With Boundary Walls And Gatepiers				55°57′17″N 4°49′40″W	Category C(S)	34033	Upload Photo
38-44 (Even Nos) Albert Road				55°57′33″N 4°49′24″W	Category C(S)	33980	Upload Photo
Ashton Road, Royal Gourock Yacht Club With Boundary Walls And Gatepiers				55°57′16″N 4°50′10″W	Category C(S)	33990	Upload another image See more images
11 Ashton Road				55°57′17″N 4°49′55″W	Category C(S)	33991	Upload Photo
52 And 53 Ashton Road				55°57′14″N 4°50′16″W	Category C(S)	33998	Upload Photo
Bath Street, St John's Church (Church Of Scotland) With Hall, Walls, Gatepiers And Lamp Standards				55°57′39″N 4°49′12″W	Category B	34000	Upload Photo
5 Barrhill Road With Boundary Walls, Gatepiers And Railings				55°57′36″N 4°49′15″W	Category C(S)	34002	Upload Photo
6 And 7 Barrhill Road				55°57′35″N 4°49′16″W	Category C(S)	34003	Upload Photo
1 Cloch Road				55°57′23″N 4°48′11″W	Category C(S)	34011	Upload Photo
Cove Road And Cardwell Road, Fountain				55°57′24″N 4°48′10″W	Category C(S)	34012	Upload another image See more images
31-42 (Inclusive Nos) Cove Road With Boundary Walls				55°57′25″N 4°48′26″W	Category C(S)	34013	Upload Photo
1 Davidson Drive, West Lodge				55°57′27″N 4°48′54″W	Category C(S)	34014	Upload another image
23 Kempock Place And 2-8 (Even Nos) Bath Street				55°57′41″N 4°49′06″W	Category B	34015	Upload Photo
Shore Street, Municipal Buildings, Police Station And Nos 116, 117 And 118 Shore Street				55°57′40″N 4°49′02″W	Category C(S)	34024	Upload another image
20 And 20A Victoria Road				55°57′15″N 4°49′45″W	Category C(S)	34036	Upload Photo
Ashburn Gate, Queen's Residential Home For The Elderly				55°57′20″N 4°49′43″W	Category C(S)	33988	Upload Photo
Barrhill Road, St Bartholomew's (Episcopal) Church And Boundary Wall				55°57′35″N 4°49′20″W	Category B	34001	Upload Photo
Binnie Street, Former Gourock Primary School				55°57′35″N 4°48′36″W	Category B	34006	Upload Photo
51 And 53 Broomberry Drive And 38 And 40 John Street				55°57′29″N 4°49′08″W	Category C(S)	34007	Upload Photo
2 And 4 Broomberry Drive With Boundary Wall And Gatepiers				55°57′31″N 4°49′19″W	Category C(S)	34008	Upload Photo
38-44 (Even Nos) Broomberry Drive				55°57′27″N 4°49′07″W	Category C(S)	34009	Upload Photo
Moorfield Road, Moorlea				55°57′12″N 4°49′56″W	Category C(S)	34019	Upload Photo
12 And 13 Albert Road				55°57′38″N 4°49′18″W	Category C(S)	33977	Upload Photo
16 And 17 Albert Road				55°57′38″N 4°49′19″W	Category B	33979	Upload Photo
86 And 88 Albert Road				55°57′29″N 4°49′30″W	Category C(S)	33984	Upload Photo
114 And 115 Albert Road With Boundary Wall And Gatepiers				55°57′24″N 4°49′40″W	Category B	33986	Upload Photo
121 Albert Road, Spinnaker Hotel				55°57′19″N 4°49′48″W	Category C(S)	33987	Upload Photo
41, 42 And 43 Ashton Road Whitebank				55°57′15″N 4°50′11″W	Category B	33995	Upload Photo
44, 44A And 45 Ashton Road				55°57′15″N 4°50′12″W	Category C(S)	33996	Upload Photo
54, 54A And 55 Ashton Road With Coach House				55°57′14″N 4°50′17″W	Category B	33999	Upload Photo
19 And 20 Moorfield Road With Boundary Wall, Gatepiers And Railings				55°57′11″N 4°49′58″W	Category C(S)	34020	Upload Photo
105 Shore Street And 1 And 2 Hopeton Street, Victoria Bar With Courtyard Buildings				55°57′38″N 4°49′01″W	Category C(S)	34026	Upload Photo
39 Tower Drive With Boundary Walls				55°57′13″N 4°49′35″W	Category C(S)	34028	Upload Photo
27 Victoria Road				55°57′14″N 4°49′47″W	Category C(S)	34031	Upload Photo
14, 16 And 18 Victoria Road, Glenacre, With Boundary Walls And Gatepiers				55°57′16″N 4°49′42″W	Category B	34035	Upload Photo
Albert Road, Jubilee Drinking Fountain				55°57′22″N 4°49′46″W	Category C(S)	33975	Upload Photo
96 And 97 Albert Road With Gatepiers				55°57′27″N 4°49′33″W	Category C(S)	33985	Upload Photo
30, 31 And 32 Ashton Road				55°57′16″N 4°50′04″W	Category C(S)	33994	Upload Photo
68, 70 And 72 Cardwell Road And 41 Manor Crescent				55°57′23″N 4°48′11″W	Category C(S)	34010	Upload Photo
19 Victoria Road, The Croft				55°57′14″N 4°49′41″W	Category C(S)	34030	Upload Photo
12 Victoria Road				55°57′17″N 4°49′41″W	Category C(S)	34034	Upload Photo
44-50 (Even Nos) Kempock Street				55°57′43″N 4°49′13″W	Category B	34017	Upload Photo
7 Moorfield Road And 12 Golf Road, Royston				55°57′12″N 4°50′01″W	Category B	34018	Upload Photo
Tower Hill, Tower				55°57′24″N 4°49′20″W	Category B	34029	Upload another image See more images
Albert Road, War Memorial				55°57′38″N 4°49′21″W	Category C(S)	33976	Upload another image
26 Royal Street				55°57′33″N 4°48′59″W	Category C(S)	34022	Upload Photo
14 Albert Road				55°57′38″N 4°49′18″W	Category C(S)	33978	Upload Photo
76 And 78 Albert Road With Boundary Wall And Gatepiers				55°57′30″N 4°49′29″W	Category B	33982	Upload Photo
17 And 18 Ashton Road				55°57′17″N 4°49′58″W	Category B	33992	Upload Photo
29 Barrhill Road, Craigard, With Boundary Walls And Gatepiers				55°57′25″N 4°49′29″W	Category C(S)	34004	Upload Photo
Binnie Street, Gourock Community Education Centre, Former Gourock Central School With Boundary Walls And Railings				55°57′31″N 4°49′02″W	Category C(S)	34005	Upload another image See more images

== Key ==
The scheme for classifying buildings in Scotland is:

- Category A: "buildings of national or international importance, either architectural or historic; or fine, little-altered examples of some particular period, style or building type."
- Category B: "buildings of regional or more than local importance; or major examples of some particular period, style or building type, which may have been altered."
- Category C: "buildings of local importance; lesser examples of any period, style, or building type, as originally constructed or moderately altered; and simple traditional buildings which group well with other listed buildings."

In March 2016 there were 47,288 listed buildings in Scotland. Of these, 8% were Category A, and 50% were Category B, with the remaining 42% being Category C.

== See also ==
- List of listed buildings in Inverclyde
