= Joseph Maclay, 2nd Baron Maclay =

Scottish banker, shipowner, peer and Liberal politician

The Right Honourable The Lord Maclay KBE

Member of the House of Lords
- Lord Temporal
- In office 24 April 1951 – 7 November 1969
- Preceded by: The 1st Baron Maclay
- Succeeded by: The 3rd Baron Maclay

Member of Parliament for Paisley
- In office 27 October 1931 – 15 June 1945
- Preceded by: James Welsh
- Succeeded by: Viscount Corvedale

Personal details
- Born: Joseph Paton Maclay; 31 May 1899
- Died: 7 November 1969 (aged 70)
- Party: Liberal
- Occupation: Banker, shipowner, politician

Joseph Paton Maclay, 2nd Baron Maclay (31 May 1899 – 7 November 1969), was a Scottish banker, shipowner, peer and Liberal politician.

== Family and education ==
Maclay was the eldest surviving son of Joseph Maclay, 1st Baron Maclay, and his wife Martha (née Strang), two elder brothers having died during World War I. John Maclay, 1st Viscount Muirshiel, was his younger brother. The family lived at Duchal House. Lord Maclay married Nancy Margaret Greig, daughter of Robert Coventry Greig, in 1936. Their wedding was held in Paisley Abbey. He was educated at Fettes College, Edinburgh, and Trinity College, Cambridge, where he read economics. He died in hospital in November 1969, aged 70, and a memorial service was held for him in Glasgow Cathedral. He was succeeded in the barony by his eldest son Joseph.

== Business ==
Maclay went into the shipping business and became chairman of the company his father had established, Maclay and McIntyre of Glasgow. He was president of the Chamber of Shipping of the United Kingdom, 1946–47, Chairman of the General Council of British Shipping, 1946–47, and Lord Dean of Guild, Glasgow, 1952–54. In February 1947, he chaired the International Shipping Conference in London. He was a Director of the Midland Bank and Chairman of Clydesdale and North Scotland Bank.

== Parliament and other public office ==
He was elected to the House of Commons as Member of Parliament (MP) for Paisley in 1931, a seat he held until the 1945 general election. Maclay was elected as a Liberal in support of the National Government and prime minister Ramsay MacDonald. When the Liberal Party led by Sir Herbert Samuel withdrew from the coalition in November 1933, Maclay refused to cross the floor into opposition with Samuel. However he never seems to have taken the whip of the Liberal National Party, the group in Parliament led by Sir John Simon.

At the 1935 general election he was re-elected in Paisley as a Liberal, although as in 1931 he had no Conservative opponent. This was because he generally tended to support the government. In the crucial vote after the Norway debate on 8 May 1940 which led to the downfall of Neville Chamberlain he was one of only two Liberals to support the government (the other was Gwilym Lloyd George). Despite this, his relations with Herbert Samuel must have remained cordial as he was invited by Samuel to accompany him to a conference of the Institute of Pacific Relations held in Banff in Canada during the summer recess of 1933 to act as an honorary private secretary and before the conference they enjoyed some walking together in the forested countryside around Lake Louise.

During the Second World War, Maclay followed similar footsteps to those his father had trod in the Great War, when he was appointed Head of the Convoy and Admiralty Liaison, in the Ministry of War Transport between 1943 and 1945.

In 1951, he succeeded his father in the barony and entered the House of Lords.

Parliament of the United Kingdom
Preceded by James Welsh	Member of Parliament for Paisley; 1931–1945	Succeeded by Viscount Corvedale
Peerage of the United Kingdom
Preceded by Joseph Maclay	Baron Maclay; 1951–1969; Member of the House of Lords (1951–1969)	Succeeded by Joseph Maclay
Baronetage of the United Kingdom
Preceded by Joseph Maclay	Baronet of Park Terrace; 1951–1969	Succeeded by Joseph Maclay
