= Watt Library =

Coordinates: 55°57′03″N 4°45′57″W

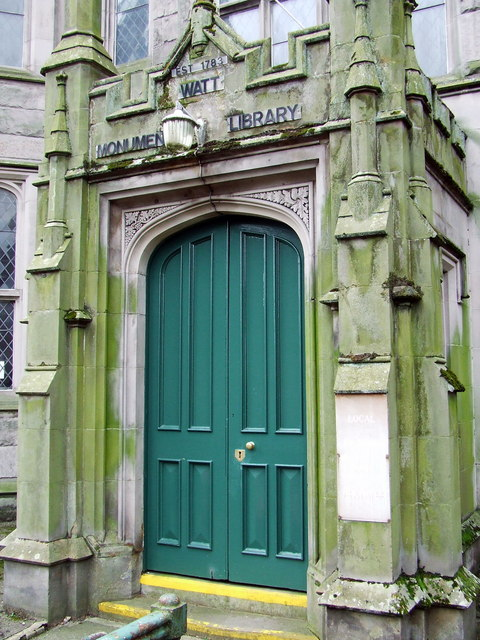
- library entrance
- Former names: Greenock Library The Watt Monument Library
- Alternative names: The Watt Institution

General information
- Status: Listed Category A
- Architectural style: Gothic Revival
- Location: Greenock
- Address: 9 Union Street, Greenock, PA16 8JH
- Owner: Inverclyde Council

Design and construction
- Architect(s): Sir Edward Blore

Website
- Archives at the Watt Institution website]

The Watt Library or Watt Monument Library in Greenock, Scotland, opened on its current site in 1837 and was the direct descendant of the Greenock Library, a subscription library founded in 1783. It closed as a subscription library in 1971 and re-opened as a public facility in 1973 under the name of the Watt Library, specialising in Local History and Archives. The building was designed in the Gothic revival style by architect Sir Edward Blore and is a listed building. It has undergone recent refurbishment and re-opened in November 2019 as the Watt Institution, incorporating the McLean Museum Watt Lecture Hall and Inverclyde Archives.

== History ==
The Watt Library is the direct descendant of the Greenock Library, founded in 1783 as a subscription library. James Watt was a patron of the library and on his death, members of the James Watt Club proposed erecting a memorial to him in the form of a new library building and statue.

The initial drawings for the building were created at a different site near the Well Park in Greenock by William Burn but were not followed through, instead the drawings of Sir Edward Blore, who built the front wing of Buckingham Palace, were used. The new library building was opened in 1837 with the statue being erected the following year. The building has been given Listed status, Category A by Historic Scotland. Sir Francis Leggatt Chantrey sculpted the impressive marble statue of James Watt which is on permanent display inside the Library.

The Watt Library was closed for refurbishment in 2018 and opened again in 2019 incorporating the McLean Museum and Art Gallery, Watt Hall and Inverclyde Archives under the original name of the Watt Institution. This opening was timed to coincide with the year of celebrations marking the 200th anniversary of the death of James Watt after whom the library is named. The Watt Library is open on Wednesday, Thursday, Friday and Saturday between 10am-4pm. The library holds local history reference materials, access to family history resources and archive material, and can be viewed by appointment with the Archivist Lorraine Murray.

== Collections ==
In 2012, a rare book collection was discovered in a cupboard hidden by a plan chest by the former Watt Library Archivist. The collection included volumes on surgery, witchcraft and exploration dating from the 17th and 18th century. Other notable discoveries included an illustrated edition of Paradise Lost from 1827 engraved by the artist John Martin, an edition of letters by Cicero from 1538, and a Hamnet edition of Shakespeare plays from the 19th century published in Greenock. The collection was put on display at the McLean Museum in 2012.
