= List of Category A listed buildings in Inverclyde =

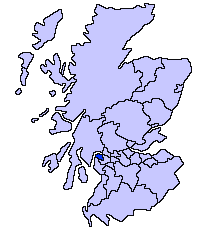
Inverclyde shown within Scotland

This is a list of Category A listed buildings in the Inverclyde council area in west-central Scotland.

In Scotland, the term listed building refers to a building or other structure officially designated as being of "special architectural or historic interest". Category A structures are those considered to be "buildings of national or international importance, either architectural or historic, or fine little-altered examples of some particular period, style or building type." Listing was begun by a provision in the Town and Country Planning (Scotland) Act 1947, and the current legislative basis for listing is the Planning (Listed Buildings and Conservation Areas) (Scotland) Act 1997. The authority for listing rests with Historic Scotland, an executive agency of the Scottish Government, which inherited this role from the Scottish Development Department in 1991. Once listed, severe restrictions are imposed on the modifications allowed to a building's structure or its fittings. Listed building consent must be obtained from local authorities prior to any alteration to such a structure. There are approximately 47,400 listed buildings in Scotland, of which around 8% (some 3,800) are Category A.

The council area of Inverclyde covers 160 square kilometres (62 sq mi), and has a population of around 79,800. There are 25 Category A listed buildings in the area.

== Listed buildings ==
| Name | Location | Date listed | Geo-coordinates | Notes | LB number | Image |
|---|---|---|---|---|---|---|
| St Columba's Church | Kilmacolm, Duchal Road | 10 June 1971 | 55°53′35″N 4°37′37″W | William Leiper | 12448 | Upload another image See more images |
| Windyhill | Kilmacolm, Rowantreehill Road | 10 June 1971 | 55°53′24″N 4°37′13″W | Charles Rennie Mackintosh | 12450 | Upload another image See more images |
| Duchal House | Strathgryfe, Kilmacolm | 10 June 1971 | 55°52′37″N 4°38′01″W | Boyd Porterfield (redesign) | 12463 | Upload Photo |
| Wemyss Bay Railway Station | Wemyss Bay | 10 June 1971 | 55°52′34″N 4°53′22″W | James Miller | 12473 | Upload another image See more images |
| Ardgowan House | Inverkip | 10 June 1971 | 55°55′01″N 4°52′12″W | Hugh Cairncross; William Burn (redesign) | 12480 | Upload another image See more images |
| Finlaystone House | Langbank, Port Glasgow Road | 10 June 1971 | 55°55′43″N 4°37′09″W | John Douglas; John James Burnet (redesign) | 13641 | Upload another image See more images |
| Tontine Hotel | Greenock, Ardgowan Square | 13 May 1971 | 55°57′10″N 4°46′05″W | | 34078 | Upload another image See more images |
| Wellpark Mid Kirk | Greenock, Cathcart Square | 13 May 1971 | 55°56′50″N 4°45′23″W | | 34096 | Upload another image See more images |
| Custom House | Greenock, Custom House Place | 13 May 1971 | 55°56′53″N 4°45′04″W | William Burn | 34100 | Upload another image See more images |
| Municipal Buildings | Greenock, Clyde Square | 13 May 1971 | 55°56′53″N 4°45′22″W | H & D Barclay | 34122 | Upload another image See more images |
| St Luke's Church (formerly The Old Kirk) | Greenock, Nelson Street | 13 May 1971 | 55°56′56″N 4°46′00″W | David Cousin | 34134 | Upload another image See more images |
| Sir Gabriel Wood's Mariners' Asylum | Greenock, Newark Street | 13 May 1971 | 55°57′33″N 4°47′15″W | David Mackintosh | 34136 | Upload another image See more images |
| Lyle Kirk (formerly Finnart - St Paul's Church) | Greenock, Newark Street | 13 May 1971 | 55°57′31″N 4°46′53″W | R. Rowand Anderson | 34139 | Upload another image See more images |
| Lyle Kirk, Esplanade Buildings (formerly Old West Kirk) | Greenock, Esplanade | 13 May 1971 | 55°57′22″N 4°46′03″W | Unknown architect James Miller (redesign); The Pirie Hall annex is listed Category C. | 34095 | Upload another image See more images |
| Watt Library and McLean Museum | Greenock, Union Street | 13 May 1971 | 55°57′03″N 4°45′58″W | Edward Blore | 34148 | Upload another image See more images |
| Well Park: Well | Greenock, Well Park, Well | 13 May 1971 | 55°56′46″N 4°45′16″W | | 34166 | Upload another image See more images |
| Sugar Warehouse | Greenock, James Watt Dock | 8 December 1976 | 55°56′33″N 4°43′35″W | | 34172 | Upload another image See more images |
| St Patrick's RC Church and Presbytery | Greenock, Orangefield | 8 June 1979 | 55°56′48″N 4°46′12″W | Gillespie, Kidd and Coia | 34173 | Upload another image See more images |
| Titan Cantilever Crane | Greenock, James Watt Dock | 14 April 1989 | 55°56′38″N 4°43′50″W | | 34175 | Upload another image See more images |
| St Laurence's RC Church and Presbytery | Greenock, Kilmacolm Road | 23 September 1994 | 55°56′24″N 4°44′45″W | Gillespie, Kidd and Coia | 34184 | Upload another image See more images |
| Gourock Ropeworks | Port Glasgow | 7 October 1988 | 55°56′01″N 4°40′55″W | | 40067 | Upload another image See more images |
| Former Municipal Buildings | Port Glasgow, Fore Street | 28 January 1971 | 55°56′05″N 4°41′15″W | David Hamilton | 40071 | Upload another image See more images |
| Broadfield Hospital, Broadstone House | Port Glasgow, Old Greenock Road | 28 January 1971 | 55°55′42″N 4°38′36″W | David Bryce; Substantially redeveloped; listing reflects its pre-developed state | 40078 | Upload another image |
| Holy Family Roman Catholic Church and Presbytery | Port Glasgow, Parkhill Avenue | 23 September 1994 | 55°55′43″N 4°39′31″W | Gillespie, Kidd and Coia | 40088 | Upload another image See more images |
| Scott's Dry Dock with Outer Basin | Greenock | 18 July 2005 | 55°56′40″N 4°44′40″W | | 50131 | Upload another image |

== See also ==
- Scheduled monuments in Inverclyde
