= Joseph Maclay, 1st Baron Maclay =

Scottish businessman and public servant

The Right Honourable The Lord Maclay PC
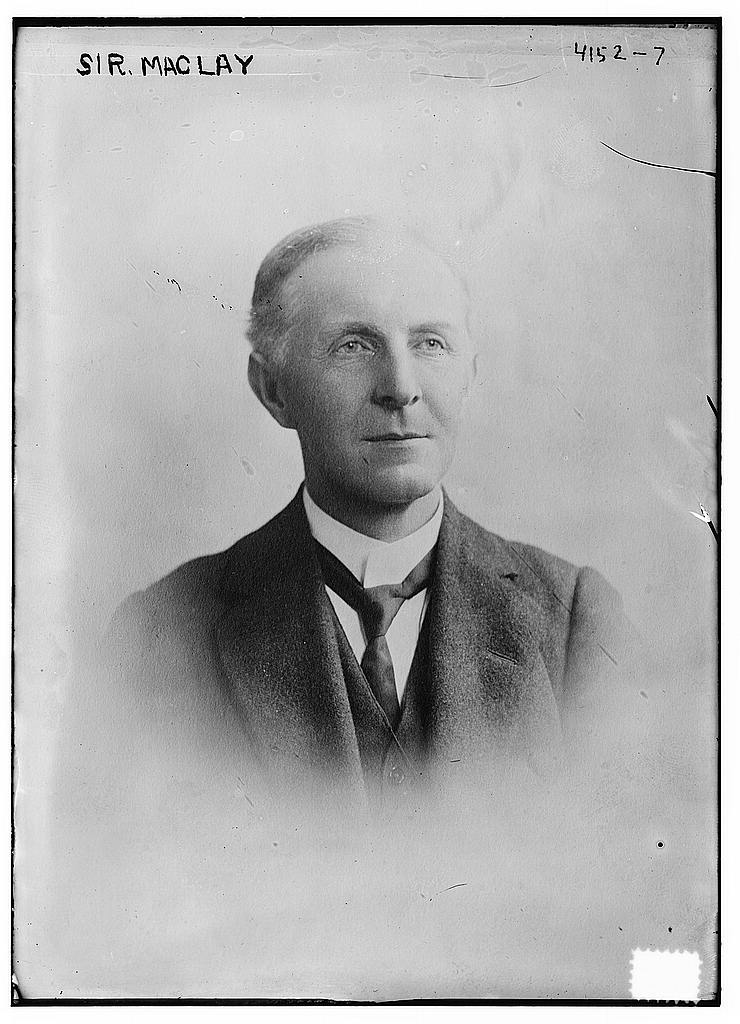
- Joseph Maclay, 1st Baron Maclay

Member of the House of Lords
- Lord Temporal
- In office 11 December 1922 – 24 April 1951
- Preceded by: Peerage created
- Succeeded by: The 2nd Baron Maclay

Personal details
- Born: Joseph Paton Maclay; 6 September 1857
- Died: 24 April 1951 (aged 93)

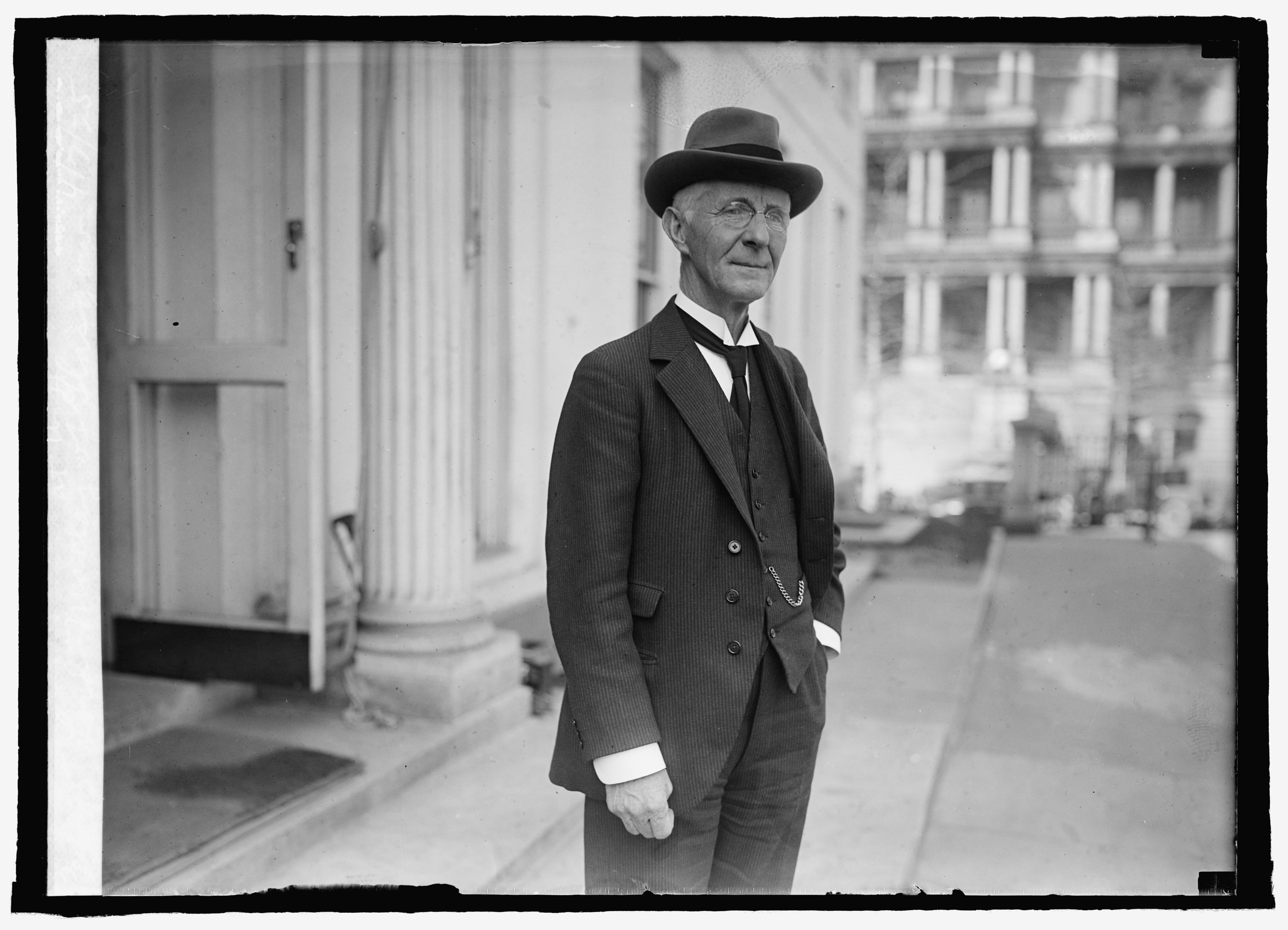
Maclay at the White House in Washington, D.C., in 1925

Joseph Paton Maclay, 1st Baron Maclay (6 September 1857 – 24 April 1951), known as Sir Joseph Maclay, 1st Baronet, from 1914 to 1922, was a Scottish businessman and public servant.

== Biography ==
Maclay was the son of Ebenezer Maclay of Glasgow. He was Chairman of Maclay & Macintyre Ltd, shipowners, of Glasgow. In 1916 he was admitted to the Privy Council and appointed Minister of Shipping (Shipping Controller), a post he held until 1921. Because he was not a member of either house of Parliament, the ministry's spokesman in the House of Commons was Maclay's junior minister Sir Leo Chiozza Money, whose appointment he had tried to resist.

Maclay opposed nationalisation of merchant shipping (it was instead brought under state control but not ownership, like the railways at the time), and insisted that owners still be allowed to make a profit as an incentive, although excessive profits were taxed. Maclay approved four standard designs of merchant ship and began the process of increasing ship construction, although he was hampered by shortages of steel and labour, and ships under construction in the USA were confiscated when she entered the war. Maclay rejected Admiral Jellicoe's arguments that convoys presented too large a target to U-boats, and that merchant ship masters lacked the discipline to "keep station" in a convoy (from personal experience, he knew the latter to be false).

Maclay was created a baronet, of Park Terrace in the City of Glasgow in the County of Lanark, in 1914, and in 1922 he was raised to the peerage as Baron Maclay, of Glasgow in the County of Lanark. In 1915, he purchased Duchal House and its estates in Kilmacolm, Renfrewshire, which remains the seat of the Lords Maclay to this day.

He also served as a trustee and treasurer of the "Orphan Homes of Scotland, Consumption Sanatoria of Scotland and Colony of Mercy for Epileptics" originally founded by William Quarrier.

Lord Maclay married Martha Strang, daughter of William Strang, in 1889. She died in 1929. Lord Maclay survived her by over twenty years and died in April 1951, aged 93. He was succeeded in the barony by his eldest surviving son Joseph. His fifth son, John, was a prominent politician and was created Viscount Muirshiel in 1964.

Maclay was a devout Sabbatarian, who would not even read newspapers on a Sunday, and whose only publication, in 1918, was a book of prayers for family use.

Political offices
New office	Minister of Shipping; 1916–1921	Office abolished
Peerage of the United Kingdom
New creation	Baron Maclay; 1922–1951; Member of the House of Lords (1922–1951)	Succeeded by Joseph Maclay
Baronetage of the United Kingdom
New creation	Baronet of Park Terrace; 1914–1951	Succeeded by Joseph Maclay
