= Duchal House =

- Location of Duchal House in Inverclyde
- 55.8770°N 4.6335°W

Listed Building – Category A
- Designated: 10 June 1971
- Reference no.: LB12463

Inventory of Gardens and Designed Landscapes in Scotland
- Official name: Duchal House
- Designated: 31 March 2006
- Reference no.: GDL00146

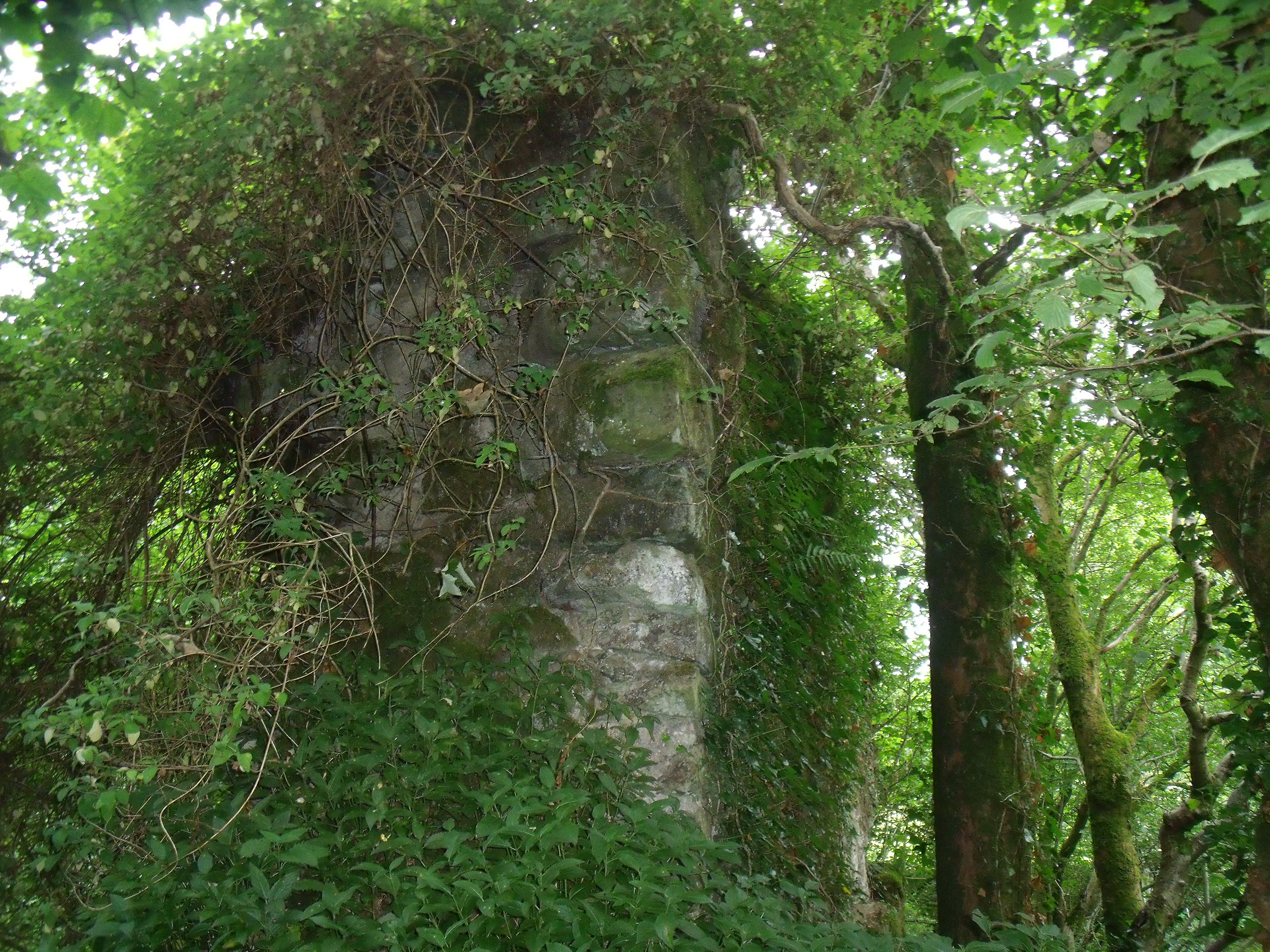
Duchal Castle.jpg

Duchal House is an 18th-century mansion and estate near Kilmacolm, Scotland. It is located in Inverclyde, in the former county of Renfrewshire. Duchal was acquired by the Porterfield family in the 16th century. The present house was built in 1710 and extended in 1768. It was owned by Lord Maclay until 2018. The house is protected as a category A listed building, and the grounds are included in the Inventory of Gardens and Designed Landscapes in Scotland, the national listing of significant gardens.

== History ==
The lands of Duchal were held by the Lyle family from the 13th century, based at Duchal Castle, now a ruin. In 1544 Duchal was acquired by John Porterfield, and in 1710 his descendant Alexander Porterfield constructed a new house. This building now forms the south range of the present house. Formal gardens had been laid out by around 1750. The house was extended eastward by Boyd Porterfield in 1768.

In 1854 the estate was acquired by the Shaw-Stewarts of Ardgowan for use as a shooting lodge. Duchal was sold in 1910, and in 1915 was purchased by the shipowner Joseph Maclay, 1st Baron Maclay, whose family occupied the house until 2018.

== See also ==
- List of Category A listed buildings in Inverclyde
- List of listed buildings in Kilmacolm, Inverclyde
