= McLean Museum =

Museum in Inverclyde, Scotland

Coordinates: 55.9509°N 4.7660°W

Watt Institution
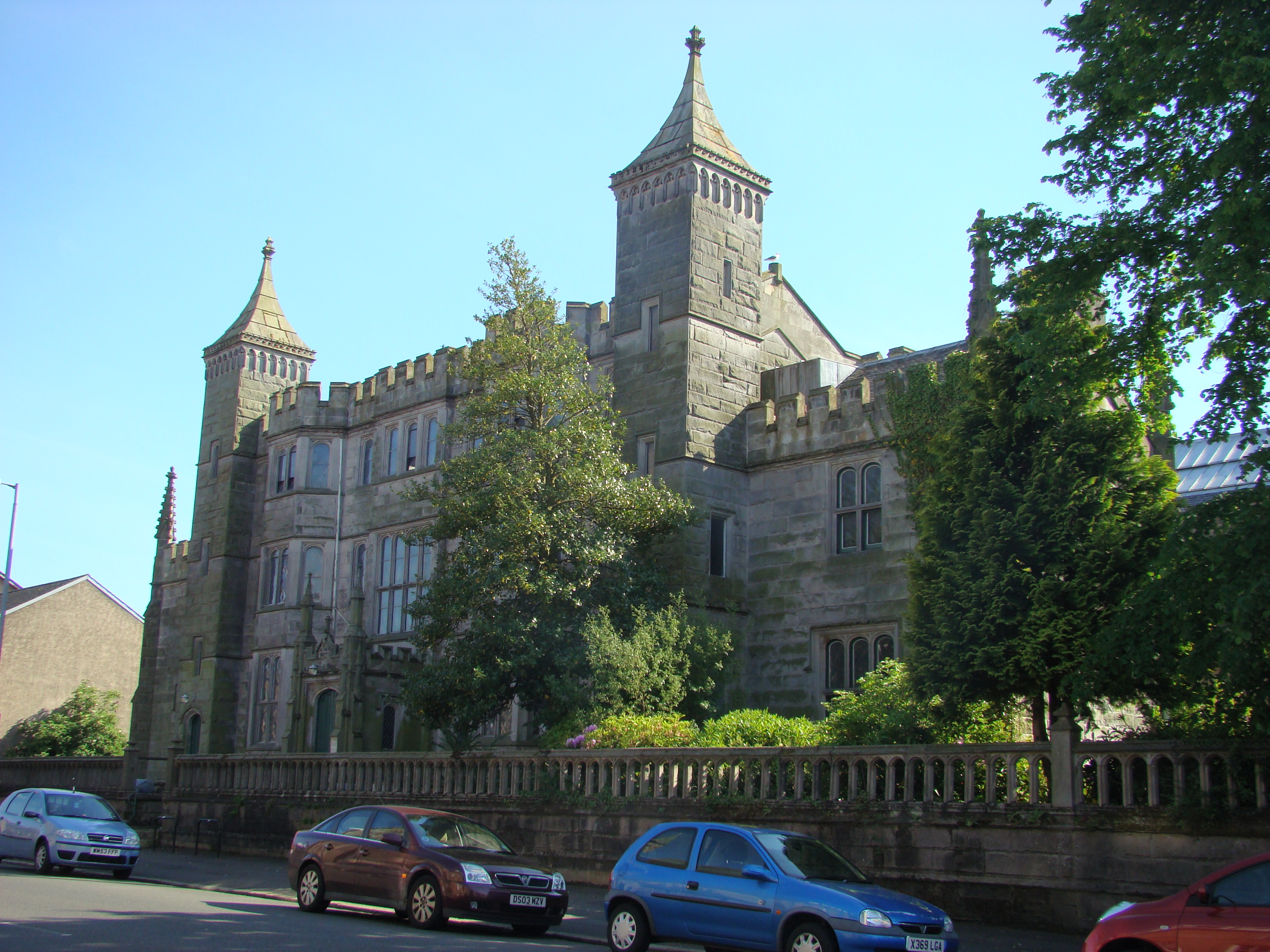
- McLean Museum's north elevation
- Established: 1876
- Location: Greenock, Scotland
- Architect: Alexander Adamson
- Owner: Inverclyde Council
- Website: inverclyde.gov.uk

The McLean Museum and Art Gallery (now officially the Watt Institution) is a museum and art gallery situated in Greenock, Inverclyde, Scotland. It is the main museum in the Inverclyde area, it is free to visit and was opened in 1876. Most notably it features an exhibition of items related to James Watt, the Greenock-born inventor, a Mummy Cartonnage from Herakleopolis Magna and a collection of British and Scottish art. The principal entrance to the museum is on Kelly Street, in the Greenock West area. The former curator is Val Boa. The Watt Institution includes the Art Gallery, Watt Hall, Watt Library and Inverclyde Archives.

== History ==
The museum owes its origins to the Greenock Philosophical Society's burgeoning collection of artificial and natural curiosities which became a museum in 1816 as branch of the Society, housed in the Greenock library. When the Greenock Library changed location to the Watt Library, Society members added "autographs, maps, prints, coins, medals, and armour to the collection." The Society sent a report to local ship owners and masters to generate interest in the museum's collection in the hope of receiving donations. In 1863 work began on building a lecture hall and museum building, funded by local timber merchant James McLean (1802–1877), who was also a member of the Philosophical Society. The new building was completed by 3 November 1876, but James McLean was unable to attend the opening due to ill health (although he still managed to visit and inspect the museum's contents), later dying in January of the next year. Thomas Struthers, a geologist and naturalist from Glasgow was the museum's first curator. In its early years the museum was loaned items from other museums, such as the Albert Museum and National Gallery in return that it would lend parts of its collection to these national museums for their exhibitions.

== Collections ==
There is a range of collections and exhibitions in the museum. Until 1914 the McLean Museum received continuing donation from the Egypt Exploration Society, which provided the museum with many items for its Egyptology collection, including a Mummy Cartonnage from Herakleopolis Magna and the temple stone from the Great Temple of Bast at Bubastis. Also hosted is an Archaeology collection including various finds such as Roman ceramic pieces, a group of 10 Palaeolithic flint implements from Milton Street, Kent and Palaeolithic stone axes from Ireland. The James Watt collection includes "plans and letters written by James Watt, tools and items used by him and images of him in the form of paintings, sculpture, prints and books." Also featured is a history of Inverclyde, a Maritime Transport collection, social history material, and exhibitions of Scottish and British artwork.

Some items from the collection can be viewed online.

== Visiting the museum ==
In 2016, Inverclyde Council closed the McLean Museum and Watt Library complex in order to undertake a £2 million refurbishment. The Council invested £1.8 million towards the refurbishment work alongside a £287,000 grant from Historic Environment Scotland. As part of the refurbishment, the gallery, museum, lecture hall and library were rebranded collectively as the Watt Institution, with access to and from the library now possible via the museum entrance on Kelly Street.

The complex re-opened to visitors on 22 November 2019.

The complex opens on Wednesdays to Saturdays, from 10am to 4pm (having previously also been open on Mondays and Tuesdays). Admission is free. There is a lack of significant designated parking area, although parking on the surrounding streets should be possible. The museum is a short walk away from Greenock West railway station and also nearby to Greenock town centre. Free tours from the museum's curatorial staff are available, however, pre-booking is required. There is also a shop which stocks a variety of items including books, cards, toys, museum standard replicas, decorative and craft items. Free internet access is also available.

== See also ==
- Scotts Shipbuilding and Engineering Company
- List of Category A listed buildings in Inverclyde
- List of listed buildings in Greenock
