= All the Stations =

Documentaries about railway stations in Britain and Ireland

- Genre: Video blog Online documentary
- Created by: Geoff Marshall; Vicki Pipe
- Presented by: Geoff Marshall; Vicki Pipe
- Theme music composer: Steven Francis
- Countries of origin: United Kingdom, Ireland, Isle of Man
- No. of series: 3
- No. of episodes: 79 (excluding bonus episodes) + 1 (long-form documentary)

Production
- Cinematography: Geoff Marshall, Martin Clitheroe (Drone footage)
- Editors: Dan Haythorn, Will Head, Geoff Marshall, Michelle Martin (Ireland only)
- Camera setup: Multi-camera
- Budget: £38,654 (Series 1) £26,350 (Series 2)

Original release
- Network: YouTube
- Release: 10 May 2017 – 14 July 2019

All the Stations is a documentary series published on YouTube, which sees Geoff Marshall and Vicki Pipe visit all 2,563 stations (Note: The British railway network had 2,563 stations at the time of filming. Additional stations have opened and some stations have closed since filming.) on Great Britain's National Rail rail network, and all 198 stations in Ireland, on the railway networks of Iarnród Éireann in the Republic of Ireland and Northern Ireland Railways in Northern Ireland. The journey across Great Britain took fourteen weeks and six days, starting at Penzance station on 7 May 2017 and finishing at Wick station on 19 August.

All videos are hosted on YouTube. An 80-minute documentary, which has additional content, along with interviews, was released on 19 May 2018.

== Funding ==
All the Stations was crowdfunded via Kickstarter, raising a total of £38,654 in 40 days (from 15 February to 27 March 2017) for the Great Britain series in 2017, and £26,350 for the Ireland series in 2019. Every contributor who donated £10 or more to the Kickstarter campaign was able to adopt a station, and their name appeared on the map on the project's website.

For travelling in Great Britain, Marshall and Pipe used All Line Rover tickets. The money raised from the crowdfunding allowed four main documentary episodes to be published each week on YouTube – there were 59 episodes in total – and also paid for 11 'bonus' episodes. Marshall also hosted further content on his channel, and there was one longer video episode paid for by sponsorship from The Trainline.

== Method ==
The rules set out before the trip were that all 2,563 stations on the National Rail network in Great Britain were to be visited (i.e. every station which appears on the Office of Rail and Road's website). (Note: See this spreadsheet.)

To visit a station, they had to be on a train that stopped at the station, but they did not have to alight from the train. In the case of request stops, the train had to be scheduled to stop if required; for a number of request stops, they used other transport to get to the station and then requested the train to stop (hence the title of the first episode "Make Your Intent Clear", referring to the instructions given to passengers using request stops).

It was estimated that if they had been required to get off the train at every station, the journey would have taken almost a year to complete.

== Stations opened and closed subsequently ==
After they had visited all 2,563 stations, Kenilworth station was scheduled to open on 10 December 2017, on which day Marshall and Pipe visited the station, although it did not actually open until April 2018. Corfe Castle and Maghull North later became stations numbers 2,565 and 2,566. The pair visited Corfe in August 2018, and Kenilworth and Maghull on 21 December 2018. Originally planned to open on 20 May 2019, Meridian Water opened on 3 June 2019, replacing the nearby Angel Road, which had closed on 31 May 2019. Marshall and Pipe visited Meridian Water on the day it opened, catching the first train to call at the station.

In July 2019, Great Western Railway started a Saturday-only service from Taunton to Bishops Lydeard on the West Somerset Railway, for a limited period of time. Marshall and Pipe visited the station on 3 August, the only day that trains were also scheduled to stop at Norton Fitzwarren.

In June 2020, the All the Stations Twitter account confirmed which newly opened stations they have yet to visit: Warrington West, Robroyston, Worcestershire Parkway, and Horden. Other stations have subsequently been opened.

In April 2022, Marshall completed a series titled Six Stations on his own channel, where he stopped at all six unvisited stations and was joined by a different guest at each station. The series began on 4 April at Worcestershire Parkway, then continued to Bow Street, Warrington West, Horden, Robroyston, and concluded at Kintore with a posting on 21 April.

In May 2022, Marshall posted on his personal channel to confirm he and Pipe had separated and she would no longer appear in his transport videos. In June, Marshall posted videos of his visits, with guests, to the new Elizabeth line stations that opened that month; of those, Tottenham Court Road, Canary Wharf, Custom House, and Woolwich were new to the National Rail network. In July, Marshall made a solo visit to the newly opened Barking Riverside, followed by a visit to Reston a couple of days later.

== Book ==
A book about the project, The Railway Adventures, authored by Marshall and Pipe, was released on 16 October 2018 by September Publishing.

== Episode list ==
This list of station visits and corresponding episodes has been compiled from the map on the All the Stations website.

=== Great Britain ===
Day No.	Date	Episode		Railway station(s) visited (Note: Stations are not necessarily listed in the order they were visited.)	
Day No.	Date	Name	No.	List	No.
1	Sunday 7 May 2017	Make Your Intent Clear	1	Penzance, St Erth, Carbis Bay, Lelant Saltings, Lelant, St Ives	6
2	Monday 8 May 2017	Gruesome Murder Holes	2	Hayle, Camborne, Redruth, Truro, Perranwell, Penryn, Penmere, Falmouth Town, Falmouth Docks, St Austell, Par, Luxulyan, Bugle, Roche, St Columb Road, Quintrell Downs, Newquay, Lostwithiel, Bodmin Parkway, Liskeard, Menheniot, St Germans, Saltash, St Budeaux Ferry Road, Keyham, Dockyard, Devonport	27
3	Tuesday 9 May 2017	Don't Leave Me Geoff	3	Coombe Junction Halt, St Keyne Wishing Well Halt, Causeland, Sandplace, Looe, Plymouth, St Budeaux Victoria Road, Bere Ferrers, Bere Alston, Calstock, Gunnislake, Ivybridge, Totnes, Newton Abbot, Torre, Torquay, Paignton, Teignmouth, Dawlish, Dawlish Warren, Starcross, Exeter St Thomas, Exeter St Davids, Newton St Cyres, Crediton, Yeoford, Copplestone, Morchard Road, Lapford, Eggesford, Kings Nympton, Portsmouth Arms, Umberleigh, Chapelton	34
4	Wednesday 10 May 2017	Sir Peter! You Should Make That Happen	4	Barnstaple, Exeter Central, St James Park, Polsloe Bridge, Digby & Sowton, Newcourt, Exmouth, Lympstone Village, Lympstone Commando, Exton, Topsham, Pinhoe, Cranbrook, Whimple, Feniton, Honiton, Axminster, Crewkerne, Yeovil Junction, Sherborne, Templecombe, Gillingham (Dorset), Tisbury, Salisbury, Warminster, Dilton Marsh, Westbury, Frome, Bruton, Castle Cary, Yeovil Pen Mill, Thornford, Yetminster, Chetnole, Maiden Newton, Dorchester West, Upwey, Weymouth	38
5	Thursday 11 May 2017	I Did Not Think This Through	5	Dorchester South, Moreton, Wool, Wareham, Holton Heath, Hamworthy, Poole, Parkstone, Branksome, Bournemouth, Pokesdown, Christchurch, Hinton Admiral, New Milton, Sway, Brockenhurst, Lymington Town, Lymington Pier, Beaulieu Road, Ashurst, Totton, Redbridge, Millbrook, Southampton Central, Romsey, Mottisfont & Dunbridge, Dean, Grateley, Andover, Whitchurch, Overton, Basingstoke, Micheldever, Winchester, Shawford, Eastleigh, Hedge End, Botley, Chandler's Ford	39
6	Friday 12 May 2017	no video	n/a	Southampton Airport Parkway, Swaythling, St Denys, Bitterne, Woolston, Sholing, Netley, Hamble, Bursledon, Swanwick, Fareham, Portchester, Cosham, Hilsea, Fratton, Portsmouth & Southsea, Portsmouth Harbour, Bedhampton, Havant, Warblington, Emsworth, Southbourne, Nutbourne, Bosham, Fishbourne, Chichester, Barnham, Ford, Littlehampton, Angmering, Goring-by-Sea, Durrington-on-Sea, West Worthing, Worthing, East Worthing, Lancing, Shoreham-by-Sea, Southwick, Fishersgate, Portslade, Aldrington, Hove	42
7	Saturday 13 May 2017	extra	n/a	Rowlands Castle, Petersfield, Liss, Liphook, Haslemere, Witley, Milford, Godalming, Farncombe, Guildford, Worplesdon, Woking, Brookwood, Wanborough, Ash, Aldershot, Farnham, Bentley, Alton, Ash Vale, North Camp, Farnborough, Fleet, Winchfield, Hook, Bramley, Mortimer, Reading West, Farnborough North, Frimley, Camberley, Bagshot, Blackwater, Sandhurst, Crowthorne, Wokingham, Winnersh, Winnersh Triangle, Earley, Reading	40
8	Sunday 14 May 2017	bonus	n/a	Ryde Pier Head, Ryde Esplanade, Ryde St Johns Road, Smallbrook Junction, Brading, Sandown, Lake, Shanklin	8
9	Monday 15 May 2017	Switch! Reverse that!	6	Bognor Regis, Arundel, Amberley, Pulborough, Billingshurst, Christ's Hospital, Horsham, Littlehaven, Faygate, Ifield, Crawley, Three Bridges, Balcombe, Haywards Heath, Wivelsfield, Burgess Hill, Hassocks, Falmer, Moulsecoomb, Preston Park, London Road (Brighton), Brighton, Plumpton, Cooksbridge, Lewes, Southease, Newhaven Town, Newhaven Harbour, Bishopstone, Seaford, Glynde, Berwick, Polegate, Hampden Park, Eastbourne, Pevensey & Westham, Pevensey Bay, Normans Bay, Cooden Beach, Collington, Bexhill, Horley, Salfords, Earlswood, Redhill, Merstham, Coulsdon South, Purley, East Croydon, Gatwick Airport	50
10	Tuesday 16 May 2017	no video	n/a	No stations were visited on this date	0
11	Wednesday 17 May 2017	Is There A Toilet on This Train?	7	Bromley South, Bickley, Chislehurst, Elmstead Woods, Grove Park, Sundridge Park, Bromley North, Shortlands, Beckenham Junction, Kent House, Norwood Junction, Anerley, Penge West, Penge East, Sydenham, Sydenham Hill, West Dulwich, Herne Hill, Brixton, St Mary Cray, Swanley, Farningham Road, Longfield, Meopham, Sole Street, Cuxton, Halling, Snodland, New Hythe, Aylesford, Petts Wood, Orpington, Chelsfield, Knockholt, Eynsford, Shoreham (Kent), Otford, Bat & Ball, Sevenoaks, Dunton Green, Kemsing, Borough Green & Wrotham, West Malling, East Malling, Barming, Maidstone East, Bearsted, Hollingbourne, Harrietsham, Lenham, Charing, Ashford International, Pluckley, Headcorn, Staplehurst, Marden, Paddock Wood, Beltring, Yalding, Wateringbury, East Farleigh, Maidstone West, Maidstone Barracks, Hither Green, Lee, Mottingham, New Eltham, Sidcup, Albany Park, Bexley, Crayford, Dartford, Stone Crossing, Greenhithe, Swanscombe, Northfleet, Gravesend, Higham, Strood, Rochester	81
12	Thursday 18 May 2017	The Sandwich Paradox	8	Chatham, Gillingham (Kent), Rainham (Kent), Newington, Sittingbourne, Kemsley, Swale, Queenborough, Sheerness-on-Sea, Teynham, Faversham, Selling, Canterbury East, Bekesbourne, Adisham, Aylesham, Snowdown, Shepherds Well, Kearsney, Dover Priory, Martin Mill, Walmer, Deal, Sandwich, Folkestone Central, Folkestone West, Sandling, Westenhanger, Wye, Chilham, Chartham, Ramsgate, Dumpton Park, Broadstairs, Margate, Westgate-on-Sea, Birchington-on-Sea, Herne Bay, Chestfield & Swalecliffe, Whitstable, Minster, Sturry, Canterbury West	43
13	Friday 19 May 2017	extra	n/a	New Cross Gate, Brockley, Honor Oak Park, Forest Hill, South Croydon, Sanderstead, Purley Oaks, Riddlesdown, Kenley, Whyteleafe, Upper Warlingham, Whyteleafe South, Woldingham, Caterham, Oxted, Hurst Green, Edenbridge, Edenbridge Town, Hever, Cowden, Ashurst, Eridge, Crowborough, Buxted, Uckfield, East Grinstead, Dormans, Lingfield, Godstone, Nutfield, Penshurst, Leigh (Kent), Tonbridge, High Brooms, Tunbridge Wells, Frant, Wadhurst, Stonegate, Etchingham, Robertsbridge, Battle, Crowhurst, West St Leonards, St Leonards Warrior Square, Doleham, Three Oaks, Ore, Winchelsea, Rye, Appledore, Ham Street, Hastings	52
14	Saturday 20 May 2017	no video	n/a	No stations were visited on this date	0
15	Sunday 21 May 2017	All the Football	9	London Victoria, London Euston, Milton Keynes Central, Stoke-on-Trent, Stockport, Manchester Piccadilly, Manchester Oxford Road, Manchester United Football Ground, Cheadle Hulme, Bramhall, Poynton, Adlington, Prestbury, Macclesfield, Congleton, Kidsgrove	16
16	Monday 22 May 2017	A Small Problem at Leatherhead	10	Reedham, Coulsdon Town, Woodmansterne, Chipstead, Kingswood, Tadworth, Tattenham Corner, Epsom Downs, Banstead, Belmont, Sutton (Surrey), Cheam, Ewell East, Epsom, Ashtead, Leatherhead, Ewell West, Stoneleigh, Motspur Park, Worcester Park, Chessington South, Chessington North, Tolworth, Malden Manor, Raynes Park, Wimbledon, Wimbledon Chase, South Merton, Morden South, St. Helier, Sutton Common, West Sutton, Carshalton, Hackbridge, Mitcham Junction, Mitcham Eastfields, Tooting, Haydons Road, Streatham, Streatham Common, Norbury, Thornton Heath, Selhurst, Carshalton Beeches, Wallington, Waddon, West Croydon	47
17	Tuesday 23 May 2017	It's London, innit!	11	Birkbeck, Crystal Palace, Gipsy Hill, West Norwood, Tulse Hill, North Dulwich, East Dulwich, Peckham Rye, Queen's Road Peckham, South Bermondsey, London Bridge, Cannon Street, New Cross, St Johns, Lewisham, Blackheath, Charlton, Woolwich Dockyard, Woolwich Arsenal, Plumstead, Abbey Wood, Belvedere, Erith, Slade Green, Barnehurst, Bexleyheath, Welling, Falconwood, Eltham, Kidbrooke, Westcombe Park, Maze Hill, Greenwich, Deptford, Waterloo East, Ladywell, Catford Bridge, Lower Sydenham, New Beckenham, Clock House, Elmers End, Eden Park, West Wickham, Hayes	44
18	Wednesday 24 May 2017	Watch For the Sign of the Lollipop	12	Wandsworth Town, Putney, Barnes, Barnes Bridge, Chiswick, Kew Bridge, Brentford, Syon Lane, Isleworth, Hounslow, Feltham, Ashford (Surrey), Windsor & Eton Riverside, Datchet, Sunnymeads, Wraysbury, Egham, Virginia Water, Longcross, Sunningdale, Ascot, Martins Heron, Bracknell, Chertsey, Addlestone, Mortlake, North Sheen, Richmond, St Margarets (London), Twickenham, Whitton, Fulwell, Teddington, Hampton Wick, Kingston, Norbiton, New Malden, Surbiton, Hampton, Kempton Park, Sunbury, Upper Halliford, Shepperton, Esher, Hersham, Walton-on-Thames, Weybridge, Byfleet & New Haw, West Byfleet, Hinchley Wood, Claygate, Oxshott, Cobham & Stoke d'Abernon, Bookham, Effingham Junction, Horsley, Clandon, London Road (Guildford), Shalford, Chilworth, Gomshall, Dorking West, Dorking Deepdene, Betchworth, Reigate, Staines	66
19	Thursday 25 May 2017	I'm in Love with the Overground	13	Clapham Junction, Earlsfield, Queenstown Road (Battersea), Vauxhall, Waterloo, Wandsworth Road, Clapham High Street, Denmark Hill, Surrey Quays, Canada Water, Rotherhithe, Wapping, Shadwell, Whitechapel, Shoreditch High Street, Hoxton, Haggerston, Dalston Junction, Dalston Kingsland, Hackney Central, Homerton, Hackney Wick, Stratford, Maryland, Forest Gate, Woodgrange Park, Wanstead Park, Leytonstone High Road, Leyton Midland Road, Walthamstow Queen's Road, Blackhorse Road, South Tottenham, Harringay Green Lanes, Crouch Hill, Upper Holloway, Gospel Oak, Canonbury, Highbury & Islington, Caledonian Road & Barnsbury, Camden Road, Kentish Town West, Hampstead Heath, Finchley Road & Frognal, West Hampstead, Brondesbury, Brondesbury Park, Kensal Rise, Willesden Junction, Shepherd's Bush, Kensington (Olympia), West Brompton, Imperial Wharf, Acton Central, South Acton, Gunnersbury, Kew Gardens	56
20	Friday 26 May 2017	no video	n/a	Liverpool Street, Tottenham Hale, Ponders End, Brimsdown, Enfield Lock, Waltham Cross, Cheshunt, Broxbourne, Roydon, Harlow Town, Harlow Mill, Sawbridgeworth, Bishops Stortford, Stansted Airport	14
21	Saturday 27 May 2017	no video	n/a	No stations were visited on this date	0
22	Sunday 28 May 2017	no video	n/a	No stations were visited on this date	0
23	Monday 29 May 2017	no video	n/a	No stations were visited on this date	0
24	Tuesday 30 May 2017	It's Time to Get A Tea	14	London Marylebone, London Paddington, Harrow-on-the-Hill, Rickmansworth, Chorleywood, Chalfont & Latimer, Amersham, Great Missenden, Wendover, Stoke Mandeville, Aylesbury, Aylesbury Vale Parkway, Little Kimble, Monks Risborough, Princes Risborough, Saunderton, High Wycombe, Beaconsfield, Seer Green & Jordans, Gerrards Cross, Haddenham & Thame Parkway, Bicester North, Banbury, Kings Sutton, Heyford, Tackley, Radley, Appleford, Didcot Parkway, Cholsey, Goring & Streatley, Pangbourne, Tilehurst, Oxford	34
25	Wednesday 31 May 2017	Big Boy Trains	15	London Fenchurch Street, Limehouse, West Ham, Barking, Dagenham Dock, Rainham, Purfleet, Grays, Tilbury Town, East Tilbury, Stanford-le-Hope, Chafford Hundred Lakeside, Ockendon, Upminster, West Horndon, Laindon, Basildon, Pitsea, Benfleet, Leigh-on-Sea, Chalkwell, Westcliff, Southend Central, Southend East, Thorpe Bay, Shoeburyness, Southend Victoria, Prittlewell, Southend Airport, Rochford, Hockley, Rayleigh, Wickford, Battlesbridge, South Woodham Ferrers, North Fambridge, Althorne, Burnham-on-Crouch, Southminster, Billericay, Manor Park, Ilford, Seven Kings, Goodmayes, Chadwell Heath, Romford, Gidea Park, Harold Wood, Brentwood, Shenfield	50
26	Thursday 1 June 2017	You're Making Me Nervous	16	Felixstowe, Ingatestone, Chelmsford, Hatfield Peverel, Witham, Kelvedon, Marks Tey, Chappel & Wakes Colne, Bures, Sudbury, Braintree, Braintree Freeport, Cressing, White Notley, Colchester, Colchester Town, Hythe, Wivenhoe, Alresford, Great Bentley, Weeley, Thorpe-le-Soken, Kirby Cross, Frinton-on-Sea, Walton-on-the-Naze, Clacton-on-Sea, Manningtree, Mistley, Wrabness, Harwich International, Dovercourt, Harwich Town, Ipswich, Westerfield, Derby Road, Trimley, Felixstowe	36
27	Friday 2 June 2017	Bonus - Cambridge North	n/a	Ebbsfleet International, London St Pancras, Stratford International, Lea Bridge, Northumberland Park, Angel Road, Rye House, St Margarets (Hertfordshire), Ware, Hertford East, Stansted Mountfitchet, Elsenham, Newport (Essex), Audley End, Great Chesterford, Whittlesford, Shelford, Cambridge, Cambridge North, Ely	20
28	Saturday 3 June 2017	There's No One Here	17	Shippea Hill, Lakenheath, Brandon, Thetford, Harling Road, Eccles Road, Attleborough, Spooner Row, Wymondham, Littleport, Downham Market, Watlington, King's Lynn, Waterbeach, Manea, March, Whittlesea, Peterborough, Huntingdon, St Neots, Sandy, Biggleswade, Arlesey, Hitchin, Letchworth, Baldock, Ashwell & Morden, Royston, Meldreth, Shepreth, Foxton, Dullingham, Newmarket, Kennett, Bury St Edmunds, Thurston, Elmswell, Stowmarket, Needham Market, Diss, Norwich	41
29	Sunday 4 June 2017	Extra	n/a	Brundall Gardens, Brundall, Lingwood, Acle, Berney Arms, Great Yarmouth, Buckenham, Cantley, Reedham (Norfolk), Haddiscoe, Somerleyton, Oulton Broad North, Lowestoft, Oulton Broad South, Beccles, Brampton (Suffolk), Halesworth, Darsham, Saxmundham, Wickham Market, Melton, Woodbridge, Salhouse, Hoveton & Wroxham, Worstead, North Walsham, Gunton, Roughton Road, Cromer, West Runton, Sheringham	31
30	Monday 5 June 2017	no video	n/a	No stations were visited on this date	0
31	Tuesday 6 June 2017	There's Someone Looking at Me	18	Farringdon, City Thameslink, Blackfriars, Elephant & Castle, Nunhead, Crofton Park, Catford, Bellingham, Beckenham Hill, Ravensbourne, Luton, Bedford, Wellingborough, Kettering, Market Harborough, Leicester, Syston, Sileby, Barrow-upon-Soar, Loughborough, East Midlands Parkway, Beeston, Nottingham, Netherfield, Radcliffe, Bingham, Aslockton, Elton & Orston, Bottesford, Grantham, Ancaster, Rauceby, Sleaford, Heckington, Boston, Wainfleet, Skegness	37
32	Wednesday 7 June 2017	Some Might Say	19	Havenhouse, Thorpe Culvert, Hubberts Bridge, Swineshead, Ruskington, Metheringham, Gainsborough Lea Road, Saxilby, Lincoln Central, Hykeham, Swinderby, Collingham, Newark Castle, Rolleston, Fiskerton, Bleasby, Thurgarton, Lowdham, Burton Joyce, Carlton, Attenborough, Long Eaton, Derby, Duffield, Belper, Ambergate, Whatstandwell, Matlock Bath, Matlock, Cromford	30
33	Thursday 8 June 2017	I'm Not From Round Here	20	Spondon, Bulwell, Hucknall, Newstead, Kirkby-in-Ashfield, Sutton Parkway, Mansfield, Mansfield Woodhouse, Shirebrook, Langwith-Whaley Thorns, Creswell, Whitwell, Worksop, Shireoaks, Kiveton Park, Kiveton Bridge, Darnall, Woodhouse, Sheffield, Dronfield, Chesterfield, Alfreton, Langley Mill, Ilkeston, Willington, Tutbury & Hatton, Uttoxeter, Blythe Bridge, Longton, Longport, Peartree	31
34	Friday 9 June 2017	I Shall Not Be Lured into This Trap	21	Burton-on-Trent, Tamworth, Wilnecote, Birmingham New Street, Water Orton, Coleshill, Nuneaton, Hinckley, Narborough, South Wigston, Melton Mowbray, Oakham, Stamford, Spalding, Market Rasen	15
35	Saturday 10 June 2017	no video	n/a	Gainsborough Central, Kirton Lindsey, Brigg, Barnetby, Habrough, Stallingborough, Healing, Great Coates, Grimsby Town, Grimsby Docks, New Clee, Cleethorpes, Ulceby, Thornton Abbey, Goxhill, New Holland, Barrow Haven, Barton-on-Humber, Scunthorpe, Althorpe, Crowle, Thorne South, Thorne North, Hatfield & Stainforth, Kirk Sandall, Doncaster, Newark North Gate, London King's Cross	28
36	Sunday 11 June 2017	no video	n/a	No stations were visited on this date	0
37	Monday 12 June 2017	no video	n/a	No stations were visited on this date	0
38	Tuesday 13 June 2017	Weren't Just We Here?	22	South Hampstead, Kilburn High Road, Queen's Park, Kensal Green, Harlesden, Stonebridge Park, Wembley Central, North Wembley, South Kenton, Kenton, Harrow & Wealdstone, Headstone Lane, Hatch End, Carpenders Park, Bushey, Watford High Street, Watford Junction, Watford North, Garston, Bricket Wood, How Wood, Park Street, St Albans Abbey, St Albans City, Kentish Town, West Hampstead Thameslink, Cricklewood, Hendon, Mill Hill Broadway, Elstree & Borehamwood, Radlett, Harpenden, Luton Airport Parkway, Leagrave, Harlington, Flitwick, Bedford St Johns, Kempston Hardwick, Stewartby, Millbrook, Lidlington, Ridgmont, Aspley Guise, Woburn Sands, Bow Brickhill, Fenny Stratford, Bletchley, Kings Langley, Apsley, Hemel Hempstead, Berkhamsted, Tring, Cheddington, Leighton Buzzard, Wolverton, Northampton, Long Buckby, Rugby, Coventry, Canley, Tile Hill, Berkswell, Hampton-in-Arden, Birmingham International, Marston Green, Loughborough Junction	66
39	Wednesday 14 June 2017	"It's The Cutest Train I've Ever Seen!"	23	Birmingham Snow Hill, Jewellery Quarter, The Hawthorns, Smethwick Galton Bridge, Langley Green, Rowley Regis, Old Hill, Cradley Heath, Lye, Stourbridge Junction, Stourbridge Town, Hagley, Blakedown, Kidderminster, Hartlebury, Droitwich Spa, Bromsgrove, Redditch, Alvechurch, Barnt Green, Longbridge, Northfield, Kings Norton, Bournville, Selly Oak, University, Five Ways, Duddeston, Aston, Gravelly Hill, Erdington, Chester Road, Wylde Green, Sutton Coldfield, Four Oaks, Butlers Lane, Blake Street, Shenstone, Lichfield City, Lichfield Trent Valley, Witton, Perry Barr, Hamstead, Tame Bridge Parkway, Bescot Stadium, Walsall, Bloxwich, Bloxwich North, Landywood, Cannock, Hednesford, Rugeley Town, Rugeley Trent Valley	53
40	Thursday 15 June 2017	Let's Go in Search of Shakespeare	24	Birmingham Moor Street, Adderley Park, Stechford, Lea Hall, Small Heath, Tyseley, Spring Road, Hall Green, Yardley Wood, Shirley, Whitlocks End, Wythall, Earlswood, The Lakes, Wood End, Danzey, Henley-in-Arden, Wootton Wawen, Bearley, Wilmcote, Stratford Parkway, Stratford-upon-Avon, Claverdon, Acocks Green, Olton, Solihull, Widney Manor, Dorridge, Lapworth, Hatton, Warwick, Leamington Spa, Coventry Arena, Bedworth, Bermuda Park, Atherstone	36
41	Friday 16 June 2017	Mmmmmm, Humans!	25	Polesworth, Stafford, Stone, Alsager, Crewe, Nantwich, Wrenbury, Whitchurch, Prees, Wem, Yorton, Shrewsbury, Wellington, Oakengates, Telford Central, Shifnal, Cosford, Albrighton, Codsall, Bilbrook, Penkridge, Wolverhampton, Coseley, Tipton, Dudley Port, Sandwell & Dudley, Smethwick Rolfe Street	27
42	Saturday 17 June 2017	no video	n/a	Wembley Stadium, Northolt Park, South Ruislip, Denham, Denham Golf Club, Warwick Parkway, Bordesley	7
43	Sunday 18 June 2017	no video	n/a	No stations were visited this date	0
44	Monday 19 June 2017	It's All Gone Wrong	26	Ealing Broadway, West Ealing, Southall, Hayes & Harlington, West Drayton, Maidenhead, Furze Platt, Cookham, Bourne End, Marlow, Henley-on-Thames, Shiplake, Wargrave, Twyford, Burnham, Taplow, Slough, Windsor & Eton Central, Heathrow Terminal 5, Heathrow Central, Heathrow Terminal 4, Drayton Green	22
45	Tuesday 20 June 2017	Did The Victorians Have These Problems?	27	Acton Main Line, Hanwell, Iver, Langley, Culham, Oxford Parkway, Islip, Bicester Village, Hanborough, Combe, Finstock, Charlbury, Ascott-under-Wychwood, Shipton, Kingham, Moreton-in-Marsh, Honeybourne, Evesham, Pershore, Worcester Shrub Hill, Worcester Foregate Street, Malvern Link, Great Malvern, Colwall, Ledbury, Hereford	26
46	Wednesday 21 June 2017	MAXIMUM TRAINAGE	28	Leominster, Ludlow, Abergavenny, Pontypool & New Inn, Cwmbran, Newport, Severn Tunnel Junction, Caldicot, Chepstow, Lydney, Cheltenham Spa, Ashchurch for Tewkesbury, Gloucester, Cam & Dursley, Yate, Bristol Parkway, Filton Abbey Wood, Stapleton Road, Lawrence Hill, Bristol Temple Meads	20
47	Thursday 22 June 2017	What Did We Just Stumble Upon?	29	Keynsham, Oldfield Park, Bath Spa, Freshford, Avoncliff, Bradford-on-Avon, Pewsey, Bedwyn, Hungerford, Kintbury, Newbury, Newbury Racecourse, Thatcham, Midgham, Aldermaston, Theale, Swindon, Kemble, Stroud, Stonehouse, Chippenham, Melksham, Trowbridge	23
48	Friday 23 June 2017	no video	n/a	No stations were visited on this date	0
49	Saturday 24 June 2017	Bonus Video	n/a	Montpelier, Redland, Clifton Down, Sea Mills, Shirehampton, Avonmouth, St Andrews Road, Severn Beach, Pilning, Patchway, Bedminster, Parson Street, Nailsea & Backwell, Yatton, Worle, Weston Milton, Weston-super-Mare, Highbridge & Burnham, Bridgwater, Taunton, Tiverton Parkway	21
50	Sunday 25 June 2017	Bonus Video	n/a	Sampford Courtenay, Okehampton	2
51	Monday 26 June 2017	no video	n/a	Pye Corner, Rogerstone, Risca & Pontymister, Crosskeys, Newbridge, Llanhilleth, Ebbw Vale Parkway, Ebbw Vale Town, Rhymney, Pontlottyn, Tir-Phil, Brithdir, Bargoed, Gilfach Fargoed, Pengam, Hengoed, Ystrad Mynach, Llanbradach, Energlyn & Churchill Park, Aber, Caerphilly, Lisvane & Thornhill, Llanishen, Heath High Level, Cardiff Queen Street, Cardiff Bay, Cardiff Central, Grangetown, Cogan, Dingle Road, Penarth, Eastbrook, Dinas Powys, Cadoxton, Barry Docks, Barry, Barry Island, Rhoose, Llantwit Major, Bridgend, Pencoed, Llanharan, Pontyclun, Wildmill, Sarn, Tondu, Garth, Maesteg (Ewenny Road), Maesteg	49
52	Tuesday 27 June 2017	We Could Do with a TARDIS	30	Heath Low Level, Ty Glas, Birchgrove, Rhiwbina, Whitchurch, Coryton, Ninian Park, Waun-gron Park, Fairwater, Danescourt, Radyr, Taffs Well, Trefforest Estate, Trefforest, Pontypridd, Abercynon, Quakers Yard, Merthyr Vale, Troed-y-rhiw, Pentre-Bach, Merthyr Tydfil, Penrhiwceiber, Mountain Ash, Fernhill, Cwmbach, Aberdare, Treherbert, Ynyswen, Treorchy, Ton Pentre, Ystrad Rhondda, Llwynypia, Tonypandy, Dinas Rhondda, Porth, Trehafod, Cathays, Llandaf	38
53	Wednesday 28 June 2017	That's The Kind of Rain I Hate	31	Pyle, Port Talbot Parkway, Baglan, Briton Ferry, Neath, Skewen, Llansamlet, Gowerton, Llanelli, Pembrey & Burry Port, Kidwelly, Ferryside, Carmarthen, Whitland, Clunderwen, Clarbeston Road, Fishguard & Goodwick, Fishguard Harbour, Haverfordwest, Johnston, Milford Haven, Pembroke Dock, Pembroke, Lamphey, Manorbier, Penally, Tenby, Saundersfoot, Kilgetty, Narberth, Swansea	31
54	Thursday 29 June 2017	Heart of Wales Line	32	Bynea, Llangennech, Pontarddulais, Pantyffynnon, Ammanford, Llandybie, Ffairfach, Llandeilo, Llangadog, Llanwrda, Llandovery, Cynghordy, Sugar Loaf, Llanwrtyd, Llangammarch, Garth, Cilmeri, Builth Road, Llandrindod, Pen-y-Bont, Dolau, Llanbister Road, Llangynllo, Knucklas, Knighton, Bucknell, Hopton Heath, Broome, Craven Arms, Church Stretton	30
55	Friday 30 June 2017	Hello Wales, I Am in You	33	Welshpool, Newtown, Caersws, Machynlleth, Dovey Junction, Borth, Aberystwyth, Penhelig, Aberdovey, Tywyn, Tonfanau, Llwyngwril, Fairbourne, Morfa Mawddach, Barmouth, Llanaber, Talybont, Dyffryn Ardudwy, Llanbedr, Pensarn, Llandanwg, Harlech, Tygwyn, Talsarnau, Llandecwyn, Penrhyndeudraeth, Minffordd, Criccieth, Pwllheli, Abererch, Penychain, Porthmadog	32
56	Saturday 1 July 2017	You Want Me to Speak Welsh AND Walk Backwards?	34	Blaenau Ffestiniog, Roman Bridge, Dolwyddelan, Pont-y-Pant, Betws-y-Coed, Llanrwst, North Llanrwst, Dolgarrog, Tal-y-Cafn, Glan Conwy, Llandudno Junction, Deganwy, Llandudno, Conwy, Penmaenmawr, Llanfairfechan, Bangor, Llanfairpwll, Bodorgan, Tŷ Croes, Rhosneigr, Valley, Holyhead, Colwyn Bay, Abergele & Pensarn, Rhyl, Prestatyn, Flint, Shotton, Wrexham General, Chester	31
57	Sunday 2 July 2017	The Last Line in Wales	Extra	Gobowen, Chirk, Ruabon, Wrexham Central, Gwersyllt, Cefn-y-Bedd, Caergwrle, Hope, Penyffordd, Buckley, Hawarden, Hawarden Bridge, Neston, Heswall, Upton, Bidston, Birkenhead North, Birkenhead Park, Conway Park, Birkenhead Hamilton Square, Liverpool James Street, Moorfields, Liverpool Lime Street, Runcorn	24
58	Monday 3 July 2017	no video	n/a	No stations were visited on this date	0
59	Tuesday 4 July 2017	no video	n/a	Battersea Park, Wandsworth Common, Balham, Streatham Hill	4
60	Wednesday 5 July 2017	no video	n/a	No stations were visited on this date	0
61	Thursday 6 July 2017	no video	n/a	Sudbury & Harrow Road, Sudbury Hill Harrow, West Ruislip, Greenford, South Greenford, Castle Bar Park, Charing Cross, Strawberry Hill, Berrylands, Thames Ditton, Hampton Court	11
62	Friday 7 July 2017	no video	n/a	Bethnal Green, Cambridge Heath, London Fields, Hackney Downs, Clapton, St James Street, Walthamstow Central, Wood Street, Highams Park, Chingford, Rectory Road, Stoke Newington, Stamford Hill, Seven Sisters, Bruce Grove, White Hart Lane, Silver Street, Edmonton Green, Bush Hill Park, Enfield Town, Southbury, Turkey Street, Theobalds Grove, Moorgate, Old Street, Essex Road, Drayton Park, Finsbury Park, Harringay, Hornsey, Alexandra Palace, Bowes Park, Palmers Green, Winchmore Hill, Grange Park, Enfield Chase, Gordon Hill, Crews Hill, Cuffley, Bayford, Hertford North, Watton-at-Stone, New Southgate, Oakleigh Park, New Barnet, Hadley Wood, Potters Bar, Brookmans Park, Welham Green, Hatfield, Welwyn Garden City, Welwyn North, Knebworth, Stevenage	54
63	Saturday 8 July 2017	no video	n/a	No stations were visited on this date	0
64	Sunday 9 July 2017	no video	n/a	No stations were visited on this date	0
65	Monday 10 July 2017	no video	n/a	Box Hill & Westhumble, Dorking, Holmwood, Ockley, Warnham, Corby	6
66	Tuesday 11 July 2017	It's Called Manchester Air	35	Mouldsworth, Delamere, Cuddington, Hartford, Greenbank, Northwich, Lostock Gralam, Plumley, Knutsford, Mobberley, Ashley, Hale, Altrincham, Navigation Road, Mauldeth Road, Burnage, East Didsbury, Gatley, Heald Green, Handforth, Manchester Airport, Styal, Wilmslow, Alderley Edge, Chelford, Goostrey, Holmes Chapel, Sandbach, Winsford, Acton Bridge, Liverpool South Parkway	31
67	Wednesday 12 July 2017	A Lot of a Little of Liverpool	36	West Kirby, Hoylake, Manor Road, Meols, Moreton, Leasowe, Wallasey Village, Wallasey Grove Road, New Brighton, Liverpool Central, Birkenhead Central, Green Lane, Rock Ferry, Bebington, Port Sunlight, Spital, Bromborough Rake, Bromborough, Eastham Rake, Hooton, Capenhurst, Bache, Little Sutton, Overpool, Ellesmere Port, Stanlow & Thornton, Ince & Elton, Helsby, Frodsham, Runcorn East, Warrington Bank Quay, Warrington Central, Widnes, Hough Green, Cressington, Aigburth, St Michaels, Brunswick	38
68	Thursday 13 July 2017	We've Learnt Nothing	37	Edge Hill, Wavertree Technology Park, Broad Green, Roby, Huyton, Whiston, Rainhill, Lea Green, St Helens Junction, Earlestown, Newton-le-Willows, Patricroft, Eccles, Manchester Victoria, Salford Central, Salford Crescent, Swinton, Moorside, Walkden, Atherton, Hag Fold, Daisy Hill, Hindley, Wigan Wallgate, Wigan North Western, Bryn, Garswood, St Helens Central, Thatto Heath, Eccleston Park, Prescot, Mossley Hill, West Allerton, Hunts Cross, Halewood, Sankey for Penketh, Padgate, Birchwood, Glazebrook, Irlam, Flixton, Chassen Road, Urmston, Humphrey Park, Trafford Park, Deansgate	46
69	Friday 14 July 2017	It's Yorkshire, They Do It Properly	38	Reddish South, Denton, Guide Bridge, Stalybridge, Mossley, Greenfield, Marsden, Slaithwaite, Deighton, Mirfield, Ravensthorpe, Dewsbury, Batley, Morley, Cottingley, Leeds, Woodlesford, Castleford, Normanton, Wakefield Kirkgate, Streethouse, Featherstone, Pontefract Tanshelf, Darton, Barnsley, Wombwell, Elsecar, Chapeltown, Dodworth, Silkstone Common, Penistone, Denby Dale, Shepley, Stocksmoor, Brockholes, Honley, Berry Brow, Lockwood, Huddersfield	39
70	Saturday 15 July 2017	Have We Got A Time For Selfie?	39	Shipley, Bingley, Keighley, Skipton, Gargrave, Hellifield, Long Preston, Giggleswick, Clapham, Bentham, Wennington, Lancaster, Bare Lane, Morecambe, Heysham Port, Oxenholme Lake District, Kendal, Burneside, Staveley, Windermere, Carnforth	21
71	Sunday 16 July 2017	no video	n/a	Preston, Leyland, Euxton Balshaw Lane	3
72	Monday 17 July 2017	They Must Not Touch!	40	Sandhills, Bank Hall, Bootle Oriel Road, Bootle New Strand, Seaforth & Litherland, Waterloo, Blundellsands & Crosby, Hall Road, Hightown, Formby, Freshfield, Ainsdale, Hillside, Birkdale, Southport, Meols Cop, Bescar Lane, New Lane, Burscough Bridge, Hoscar, Parbold, Appley Bridge, Gathurst, Ince, Westhoughton, Bolton, Pemberton, Orrell, Upholland, Rainford, Kirkby, Fazakerley, Rice Lane, Kirkdale, Walton, Orrell Park, Aintree, Old Roan, Maghull, Town Green, Aughton Park, Ormskirk, Burscough Junction, Rufford, Croston, Salwick, Kirkham & Wesham, Moss Side, Lytham, Ansdell & Fairhaven, St Annes-on-the-Sea, Squires Gate, Blackpool Pleasure Beach, Blackpool South	54
73	Tuesday 18 July 2017	This Displeases Me	41	Blackpool North, Layton, Poulton-le-Fylde, Lostock Hall, Buckshaw Parkway, Chorley, Adlington, Blackrod, Horwich Parkway, Lostock, Hall i' th' Wood, Bromley Cross, Entwistle, Darwen, Blackburn, Ramsgreave & Wilpshire, Langho, Whalley, Clitheroe, Colne, Nelson, Brierfield, Burnley Central, Burnley Barracks, Rose Grove, Hapton, Huncoat, Accrington, Church & Oswaldtwistle, Rishton, Mill Hill, Cherry Tree, Pleasington, Bamber Bridge, Burnley Manchester Road	35
74	Wednesday 19 July 2017	This £10 Is Yours	42	Ardwick, Levenshulme, Heaton Chapel, Davenport, Woodsmoor, Hazel Grove, Middlewood, Disley, New Mills Newtown, Furness Vale, Chinley, Whaley Bridge, Chapel-en-le-Frith, Dove Holes, Buxton, New Mills Central, Strines, Marple, Rose Hill, Romiley, Bredbury, Brinnington, Reddish North, Ryder Brow, Belle Vue, Ashburys, Gorton, Fairfield, Woodley, Hyde Central, Hyde North, Flowery Field, Newton for Hyde, Godley, Hattersley, Broadbottom, Dinting, Glossop, Hadfield, Dore & Totley, Grindleford, Hathersage, Bamford, Hope, Edale	45
75	Thursday 20 July 2017	Mobile Ticketing	Bonus	Meadowhall, Rotherham Central, Swinton, Bolton-on-Dearne, Goldthorpe, Thurnscoe, Moorthorpe, Pontefract Baghill, Sherburn-in-Elmet, Church Fenton, Ulleskelf, York, Gilberdyke, Eastrington, Howden, Wressle, Selby, South Milford, Micklefield, East Garforth, Garforth, Cross Gates, Outwood, Wakefield Westgate, Sandal & Agbrigg, Fitzwilliam, South Elmsall, Adwick, Bentley, Conisbrough, Mexborough, Retford	32
76	Friday 21 July 2017	Extra	n/a	Emerson Park	1
77	Saturday 22 July 2017	no video	n/a	No stations were visited on this date	0
78	Sunday 23 July 2017	no video	n/a	No stations were visited on this date	0
79	Monday 24 July 2017	no video	n/a	Ashton-under-Lyne, Clifton, Kearsley, Farnworth, Moses Gate	5
80	Tuesday 25 July 2017	Would You Like A Quality Street?	43	Moston, Mills Hill, Castleton, Rochdale, Smithy Bridge, Littleborough, Walsden, Todmorden, Hebden Bridge, Mytholmroyd, Sowerby Bridge, Brighouse, Halifax, Low Moor, Bradford Interchange, New Pudsey, Bramley, Kirkstall Forge, Guiseley, Menston, Burley-in-Wharfedale, Ben Rhydding, Ilkley, Baildon, Frizinghall, Bradford Forster Square, Apperley Bridge, Saltaire, Crossflatts, Steeton & Silsden, Cononley, Burley Park, Headingley, Horsforth, Weeton, Pannal, Hornbeam Park, Harrogate, Starbeck	40
81	Wednesday 26 July 2017	Not Cool, Marshall	44	Knaresborough, Cattal, Hammerton, Poppleton, Malton, Seamer, Scarborough, Filey, Hunmanby, Bempton, Bridlington, Nafferton, Driffield, Hutton Cranswick, Arram, Beverley, Cottingham, Hull, Hessle, Ferriby, Brough, Broomfleet, Saltmarshe, Goole, Rawcliffe, Snaith, Hensall, Whitley Bridge, Knottingley, Pontefract Monkhill, Glasshoughton	31
82	Thursday 27 July 2017	My Feet Are Wet, But It's Still Beautiful	45	Settle, Horton-in-Ribblesdale, Ribblehead, Dent, Garsdale, Kirkby Stephen, Appleby, Penrith North Lakes, Langwathby, Lazonby & Kirkoswald, Armathwaite, Carlisle	12
83	Friday 28 July 2017	It's Just A Magnificent Thing	46	Silverdale, Arnside, Grange-over-Sands, Kents Bank, Cark and Cartmel, Ulverston, Dalton, Roose, Barrow-in-Furness, Askam, Kirkby-in-Furness, Foxfield, Green Road, Millom, Silecroft, Bootle, Ravenglass, Drigg, Seascale, Sellafield, Braystones, Nethertown, St Bees, Corkickle, Whitehaven, Parton, Harrington, Workington, Flimby, Maryport, Aspatria, Wigton, Dalston, Wetheral, Brampton, Haltwhistle, Bardon Mill Haydon Bridge, Hexham, Corbridge, Riding Mill, Stocksfield, Prudhoe, Wylam, Blaydon, MetroCentre, Newcastle	47
84	Saturday 29 July 2017	no video	n/a	No stations were visited on this date	0
85	Sunday 30 July 2017	no video	n/a	Chester-le-Street, Durham, Bishop Auckland, Shildon, Newton Aycliffe, Heighington, North Road, Dinsdale, Teesside Airport, Darlington	10
86	Monday 31 July 2017	no video	n/a	Allens West, Eaglescliffe, Thornaby, Middlesbrough	4
87	Tuesday 1 August 2017	Teach Me Some Northern Words	47	South Bank, British Steel Redcar, Redcar Central, Redcar East, Longbeck, Marske, Saltburn, Whitby, Ruswarp, Sleights, Egton, Grosmont, Glaisdale, Lealholm, Danby, Castleton Moor, Commondale, Kildale, Battersby, Great Ayton, Nunthorpe, Gypsy Lane, Marton, James Cook	24
88	Wednesday 2 August 2017	All The Pacers, All of Them	48	Thirsk, Northallerton, Yarm, Stockton, Billingham, Seaton Carew, Hartlepool, Seaham, Sunderland, Heworth, Dunston, Manors, Cramlington, Morpeth, Pegswood, Widdrington, Acklington, Chathill, Alnmouth	19
89	Thursday 3 August 2017	England: tick	49	Berwick-upon-Tweed, Dunbar, Drem, Longniddry, Prestonpans, Wallyford, Musselburgh, Edinburgh Waverley, North Berwick, Haymarket, South Gyle, Edinburgh Gateway, Dalmeny, North Queensferry, Inverkeithing, Brunstane, Newcraighall, Shawfair, Eskbank, Newtongrange, Gorebridge, Stow, Galashiels, Tweedbank	24
90	Friday 4 August 2017	To All Scottish Stations	50	Inverkeithing, Dalgety Bay, Aberdour, Burntisland, Kinghorn, Kirkcaldy, Markinch, Ladybank, Springfield, Cupar, Leuchars, Dundee, Invergowrie, Perth, Gleneagles, Dunblane, Bridge of Allan, Stirling, Alloa, Larbert, Camelon, Falkirk Grahamston, Falkirk High, Polmont, Linlithgow, Edinburgh Park, Haymarket, South Gyle, North Queensferry	29
91	Saturday 5 August 2017	no video	n/a	No stations were visited on this date	0
92	Sunday 6 August 2017	no video	n/a	No stations were visited on this date	0
93	Monday 7 August 2017	We're on the Wrong Side	51	Haymarket, Slateford, Kingsknowe, Wester Hailes, Curriehill, Kirknewton, Carstairs, Shieldmuir, Motherwell, Whifflet, Coatbridge Central, Whifflet, Kirkwood, Bargeddie, Baillieston, Mount Vernon, Carmyle, Rutherglen, Dalmarnock, Bridgeton, Argyle Street, Glasgow Central, Glasgow Queen Street, High Street, Bellgrove, Carntyne, Shettleston, Garrowhill, Easterhouse, Blairhill, Coatbridge Sunnyside, Coatdyke, Airdrie, Drumgelloch, Caldercruix, Blackridge, Armadale, Bathgate, Livingston North, Edinburgh Park, Edinburgh Waverley, Haymarket, Slateford, Kingsknowe, Wester Hailes, Curriehill, Kirknewton, Livingston South, West Calder, Kirknewton, Addiewell, Breich, Fauldhouse, Shotts, Hartwood, Cleland, Carfin, Holytown, Bellshill, Uddingston, Newton, Cambuslang, Glasgow Central	50
94	Tuesday 8 August 2017	It's Wemyss Bay Day	52	Glasgow Central, Cardonald, Hillington East, Hillington West, Paisley Gilmour Street, Paisley St James, Bishopton, Langbank, Woodhall, Port Glasgow, Bogston, Cartsdyke, Greenock Central, Greenock West, Fort Matilda, Gourock, Whinhill, Drumfrochar, Branchton, IBM, Inverkip, Wemyss Bay, Largs, Fairlie, West Kilbride, Ardrossan South Beach, Ardrossan Town, Ardrossan Harbour, Saltcoats, Stevenston, Kilwinning, Irvine, Barassie, Troon, Prestwick International Airport, Prestwick Town, Newton-on-Ayr, Dalry, Glengarnock, Lochwinnoch, Howwood, Milliken Park, Johnstone, Paisley Gilmour Street, Hillington West, Hillington East, Cardonald, Glasgow Central, Dumbreck, Mosspark, Crookston, Hawkhead, Paisley Canal	48
95	Wednesday 9 August 2017	You Can Tell It's Week Fourteen	53	Charing Cross, Partick, Hyndland, Jordanhill, Scotstounhill, Garscadden, Yoker, Clydebank, Dalmuir, Kilpatrick, Bowling, Dumbarton East, Dumbarton Central, Dalreoch, Cardross, Craigendoran, Helensburgh Central, Balloch, Alexandria, Renton, Singer, Drumry, Drumchapel, Milngavie, Hillfoot, Bearsden, Westerton, Anniesland, Kelvindale, Maryhill, Summerston, Gilshochill, Possilpark & Parkhouse, Ashfield, Springburn, Barnhill, Alexandra Parade, Duke Street, Bishopbriggs, Lenzie, Croy	41
96	Thursday 10 August 2017	no video	n/a	Anderston, Exhibition Centre, Pollokshields East, Queen's Park, Crosshill, Mount Florida, Maxwell Park, Pollokshields West, Crossmyloof, Shawlands, Pollokshaws West, Thornliebank, Patterton, Neilston, Whitecraigs, Williamwood, Clarkston, Busby, Thorntonhall, Hairmyres, East Kilbride, Giffnock, Muirend, Pollokshaws East, Langside, Cathcart, King's Park, Croftfoot, Burnside, Kirkhill, Newton, Blantyre, Hamilton West, Hamilton Central, Airbles, Shieldmuir, Chatelherault, Merryton, Larkhall, Lanark	40
97	Friday 11 August 2017	Elopements	54	Gretna Green, Annan, Lockerbie Dumfries, Sanquhar, Kirkconnel, New Cumnock, Auchinleck, Kilmarnock, Kilmaurs, Stewarton, Dunlop, Barrhead, Nitshill, Priesthill & Darnley, Kennishead, Ayr, Maybole, Girvan, Barrhill, Stranraer	21
98	Saturday 12 August 2017	no video	n/a	Stepps, Gartcosh, Caldercruix, Blackridge, Armadale, Greenfaulds, Cumbernauld, Falkirk Grahamston	8
99	Sunday 13 August 2017	no video	n/a	No stations were visited on this date	0
100	Monday 14 August 2017	no video	n/a	No stations were visited on this date	0
101	Tuesday 15 August 2017	The Ultimate Tick	55	Helensburgh Upper, Garelochhead, Arrochar & Tarbet, Ardlui, Crianlarich, Tyndrum Lower, Dalmally, Loch Awe, Falls of Cruachan, Taynuilt, Connel Ferry, Oban, Upper Tyndrum, Bridge of Orchy, Rannoch, Corrour	16
102	Wednesday 16 August 2017	For Crying Out Loud Scotland!	56	Tulloch, Roy Bridge, Spean Bridge, Fort William, Banavie, Corpach, Loch Eil Outward Bound, Locheilside, Glenfinnan, Lochailort, Beasdale, Arisaig, Morar, Mallaig, Kyle of Lochalsh, Duirinish, Plockton, Duncraig, Stromeferry, Attadale, Strathcarron, Achnashellach, Achnasheen, Achanalt, Lochluichart, Garve, Dingwall, Conon Bridge, Muir of Ord, Beauly, Inverness	31
103	Thursday 17 August 2017	I'm Not A Puffer Nutter	57	Nairn, Forres, Elgin, Keith, Huntly, Insch, Inverurie, Dyce, Aberdeen, Portlethen, Stonehaven, Laurencekirk, Montrose, Arbroath, Golf Street, Barry Links, Monifieth, Balmossie, Broughty Ferry, Invergowrie, Carnoustie	21
104	Friday 18 August 2017	I Can't Get My Spreadsheet Up	58	Dunkeld & Birnam, Pitlochry, Blair Atholl, Dalwhinnie, Newtonmore, Kingussie, Aviemore, Carrbridge	8
105	Saturday 19 August 2017	I'm Going To Start Writing Down Numbers	59	Alness, Invergordon, Fearn, Tain, Ardgay, Culrain, Invershin, Lairg, Rogart, Golspie, Dunrobin Castle, Brora, Helmsdale, Kildonan, Kinbrace, Forsinard, Altnabreac, Scotscalder, Thurso, Georgemas Junction, Wick	21

=== Ireland ===
All The Stations – Ireland, a project to visit all 198 stations on the island of Ireland, launched its Kickstarter on 6 January 2019 at 6pm; and raised the required £14,500 for this project to go ahead in just 54 minutes. The project got under way on 25 March 2019, starting at Rosslare Europort railway station, and was estimated to take approximately two weeks. The final station, Derry~Londonderry, was visited on 10 April 2019.

Day No.	Date	Episode		Railway station(s) visited	
Day No.	Date	Name	No.	List	No.
1	Friday 22 March 2019	It's Really Windy!	1	none (Note: Episode 1 concludes on the platform at Rosslare Europort, but no train is boarded.)	0
2	Saturday 23 March 2019	no video	n/a	No stations were visited on this date	0
3	Sunday 24 March 2019	no video	n/a	No stations were visited on this date	0
4	Monday 25 March 2019	Maybe Quaint Is Cute In Ireland?	2	Rosslare Europort, Rosslare Strand, Wexford, Enniscorthy, Gorey, Arklow, Rathdrum, Greystones, Bray Daly, Kilcoole, Wicklow	11
5	Tuesday 26 March 2019	That's Your Busy Face?	3	Shankill, Killiney, Dalkey, Glenageary, Sandycove and Glasthule, Dún Laoghaire, Salthill and Monkstown, Seapoint, Blackrock, Booterstown, Sydney Parade, Sandymount, Lansdowne Road, Grand Canal Dock, Dublin Pearse, Dublin Connolly, Clontarf Road, Killester, Harmonstown, Raheny, Kilbarrack, Howth Junction & Donaghmede, Bayside, Sutton, Howth	25
6	Wednesday 27 March 2019	The Blue Hue	4	Dublin Heuston, Portlaoise, Templemore, Thurles, Limerick Junction, Charleville, Mallow, Banteer, Millstreet, Rathmore, Killarney, Farranfore, Tralee	13
7	Thursday 28 March 2019	It's Nothing Like a Pacer!	5	Cork Kent, Little Island, Glounthaune, Fota, Carrigaloe, Rushbrooke, Cobh, Midleton, Carrigtwohill	9
8	Friday 29 March 2019	I Kissed A Stone And They Wiped It	6	Tipperary, Cahir, Clonmel, Carrick-on-Suir, Waterford	5
9	Saturday 30 March 2019	Abandoned Stations: Tick!	7	Bridgetown (abandoned)	0
10	Sunday 31 March 2019	It's Green and It's a Way	8	No stations were visited on this date	0
11	Monday 1 April 2019	MAXIMUM FUNCTION!	9	Thomastown, Kilkenny, Muine Bheag, Carlow, Athy, Kildare, Newbridge, Sallins and Naas, Hazelhatch and Celbridge, Adamstown, Clondalkin/Fonthill, Park West and Cherry Orchard	12
12	Tuesday 2 April 2019	There Are Two Ways To Get To Limerick	10	Drumcondra, Monasterevin, Portarlington, Ballybrophy, Roscrea, Cloughjordan, Nenagh, Birdhill, Castleconnell, Limerick Colbert	10
13	Wednesday 3 April 2019	Railway Girl	11	Sixmilebridge, Ennis, Gort, Ardrahan, Craughwell, Athenry, Oranmore, Galway Ceannt, Attymon, Woodlawn, Ballinasloe, Athlone	12
14	Thursday 4 April 2019	There's A Train Carriage In The Bar	12	Clara, Tullamore, Roscommon, Castlerea, Ballyhaunis, Claremorris, Manulla Junction, Castlebar, Westport, Foxford, Ballina	11
15	Friday 5 April 2019	Filming Me Filming You, It's The Best I Can Do	13	Sligo Mac Diarmada, Collooney, Ballymote, Boyle, Carrick-on-Shannon, Dromod, Longford, Edgeworthstown, Mullingar, Enfield, Kilcock, Maynooth, Leixlip Louisa Bridge, Leixlip Confey, M3 Parkway, Dunboyne, Hansfield, Clonsilla, Coolmine, Castleknock, Navan Road Parkway, Ashtown, Broombridge, Docklands	24
16	Saturday 6 April 2019	It's The LUAS Way To Go	14	No stations were visited on this date - All 67 Luas tram stops were visited	0
17	Sunday 7 April 2019	no video	n/a	No stations were visited on this date	0
18	Monday 8 April 2019	YouTube Hardly Ever Points Out When You're Wrong	15	Tara Street, Clongriffin, Portmarnock, Malahide, Donabate, Rush and Lusk, Skerries, Balbriggan, Gormanston, Laytown, Drogheda MacBride, Dundalk Clarke - cross from Ireland to Northern Ireland - Newry, Poyntzpass, Scarva, Portadown, Lurgan, Moira, Lisburn, Hilden, Lambeg, Derriaghy, Dunmurry, Finaghy, Balmoral, Adelaide, Great Victoria Street	27
19	Tuesday 9 April 2019	We Can't Shake Dave	16	City Hospital, Botanic, Belfast Lanyon Place, Titanic Quarter, Sydenham, Holywood, Marino, Cultra, Seahill, Helen's Bay, Carnalea, Bangor West, Bangor, Yorkgate, Whiteabbey, Jordanstown, Greenisland, Trooperslane, Clipperstown, Carrickfergus, Downshire, Whitehead, Ballycarry, Magheramorne, Glynn, Larne Town, Larne Harbour	27
20	Wednesday 10 April 2019	What The Actual Dickens!	17	Mossley West, Antrim, Ballymena, Cullybackey, Ballymoney, Coleraine, University, Dhu Varren, Portrush, Castlerock, Bellarena, Derry~Londonderry	12

=== Isle of Man ===
All The Stations – Isle of Man was a bonus project to visit all the stations on the Isle of Man. The project was funded from the funds raised as part of All The Stations – Ireland. The project took three days, between 12 July 2019 and 14 July 2019, and covered the Isle of Man Railway on the first day, the Manx Electric Railway and Snaefell Mountain Railway on the second day, and then the Great Laxey Mine Railway and Groudle Glen Railway on the third day. They were unable to ride the Douglas Bay Horse Tramway due to resurfacing works on the seafront promenade.

The precise number of stations visited as part of 'All The Stations – Isle of Man' is uncertain due to the large number of unmarked halts on the Manx Electric Railway; it is probably between 87 and 90.

Day No.	Date	Episode		Railway station(s) visited	
Day No.	Date	Name	No.	List	No.
1	Friday 12 July 2019	To The Isle of Man!	1	Douglas, Port Soderick, Santon, Ballasalla, Ronaldsway Halt, Castletown, Ballabeg, Colby, The Level, Port St Mary, Port Erin	11
2	Saturday 13 July 2019	The Manx Electric Railway	2	Derby Castle, Groudle Glen, Baldrine, Ballabeg, South Cape, Laxey, Bungalow, Snaefell Summit, Minorca, Dhoon Glen Halt, Dhoon, Glen Mona, Ballaglass Glen Halt, Cornaa, Ballajora Halt, Lewaigue, Ramsey and numerous minor halts	71 or 72 (Note: As the Manx Electric Railway has many unmarked and ill-defined minor halts, the number of stations is unclear. Marshall suggests 69 or 70 (in addition to 2 stations on the Snaefell Mountain Railway).)
3	Sunday 14 July 2019	Groudle Glen / Laxey Mine Railways	3	Valley Gardens, Mines Yard, Lhen Coan, Lime Kiln Halt, Sea Lion Rocks	5
