= Greenock Central railway station =

Railway station in Greenock, Inverclyde, Scotland

Greenock Central Scottish Gaelic: Grianaig Mheadhain
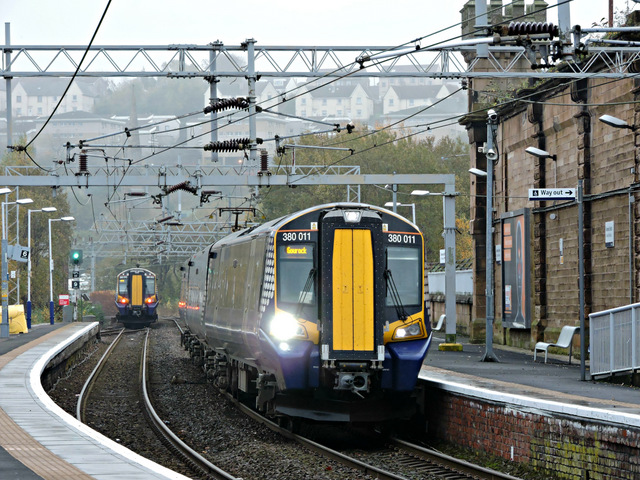

General information
- Location: Greenock, Inverclyde; Scotland
- Coordinates: 55.9450°N 4.7515°W
- Grid reference: NS282758
- Manager: ScotRail
- Platforms: 2

Other information
- Station code: GKC

Key dates
- 31 March 1841: Opened

Passengers
- 2021/22: ▲0.151 million
- Interchange: ▲523
- 2022/23: ▲0.205 million
- Interchange: ▼237
- 2023/24: ▲0.260 million
- Interchange: ▼68
- 2024/25: ▼0.245 million
- Interchange: ▲675
- 2025/26: ▲0.262 million
- Interchange: ▲716
Location
Notes
- Passenger statistics from the Office of Rail and Road

Greenock Central station is one of eight railway stations serving the town of Greenock in western Scotland, and is the nearest to the town centre. This station, which is staffed, is on the Inverclyde Line, 37 km (23 mi) west of Glasgow Central towards Gourock. It has three platforms, two of which are in use, with one disused bay platform. This disused platform is still connected to the main line.

It was originally the terminus before the railway was extended to Gourock and at that time was known as Greenock Cathcart station, as the access road to the station leads off the town's Cathcart Street.

== History ==
The station was opened by the Glasgow, Paisley and Greenock Railway on 31 March 1841 as the terminus of its line from Bridge Street railway station, which had a shared section between Glasgow, and Paisley Gilmour Street being run by the Glasgow and Paisley Joint Railway. Greenock was already a major seaport and a branch near the station provided a goods service, but it was the passenger service which proved a major success.

The new station provided a connection to Clyde steamers, which took around two hours to get from Glasgow down the River Clyde as far as Greenock, and now for the first time a railway took about an hour to get to the coast. Black's Guide published by A & C Black in 1854 advised: "By taking the railway train from Glasgow to Greenock (running hourly to suit the steamers), the tourist does not need to leave until generally an hour after the steamer's departure from Glasgow". The terminus entrance from Cathcart Street was around 300 yards (280 m) from Custom House Quay, Greenock, where steamers took wealthy commuters in summer to their villas around the shores of the Firth of Clyde as well as huge numbers of holidaymakers visiting resorts down the firth at "trades holidays", particularly the annual Glasgow Fair.

When the railway merged with the Caledonian Railway on 9 July 1847, Greenock Cathcart was the main access to the coast. However, in 1869 their dominance of this traffic ended when the Glasgow and South Western Railway opened its station on the waterfront at Princes Pier, Greenock. Greenock's growth had led to increasing overcrowding of tenement houses, and passengers were glad to avoid the walk through these streets. Attempts by the Caledonian to extend their railway to Gourock had met with difficulties in getting through a built up area, but now, spurred by competition, they gained Parliamentary approval for in 1884 for The Caledonian Railway (No. 2) Bill. The route took the railway in a tunnel from the station under the town's Well Park (which provides a level area atop a high rocky crag), then in further cuttings and tunnels westwards through the hillside, including the 1.2-mile (1.9 km) long tunnel under Newton Street, until clear of the expensive properties on the coast. After three years in construction the Gourock Extension Railway opened on 1 June 1889.

In the 1923 grouping, the line became part of the LMS, then after coming under British Railways. The line was electrified in 1967.

== The station buildings ==
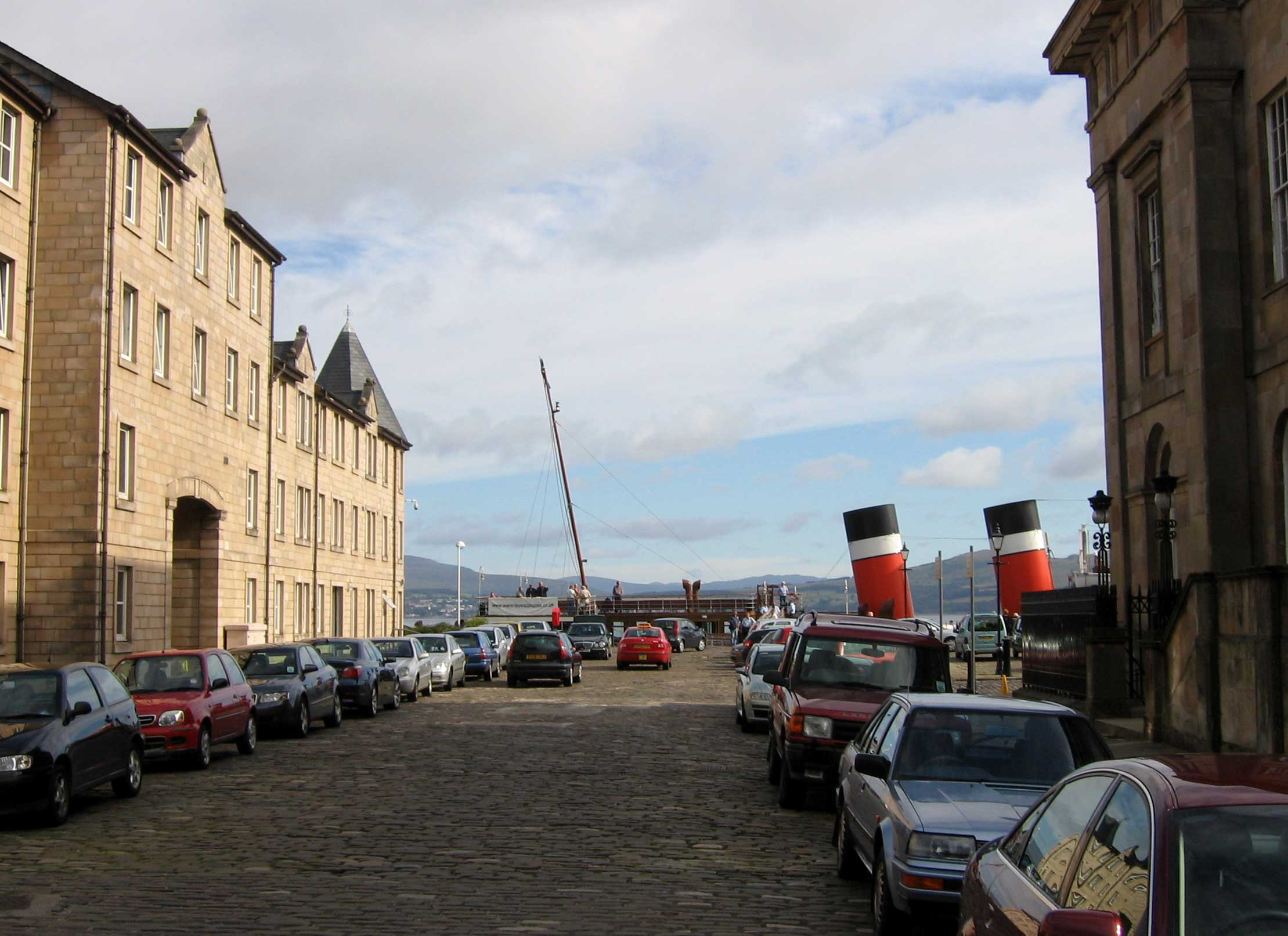
The Clyde steamer Waverley at Custom House Quay

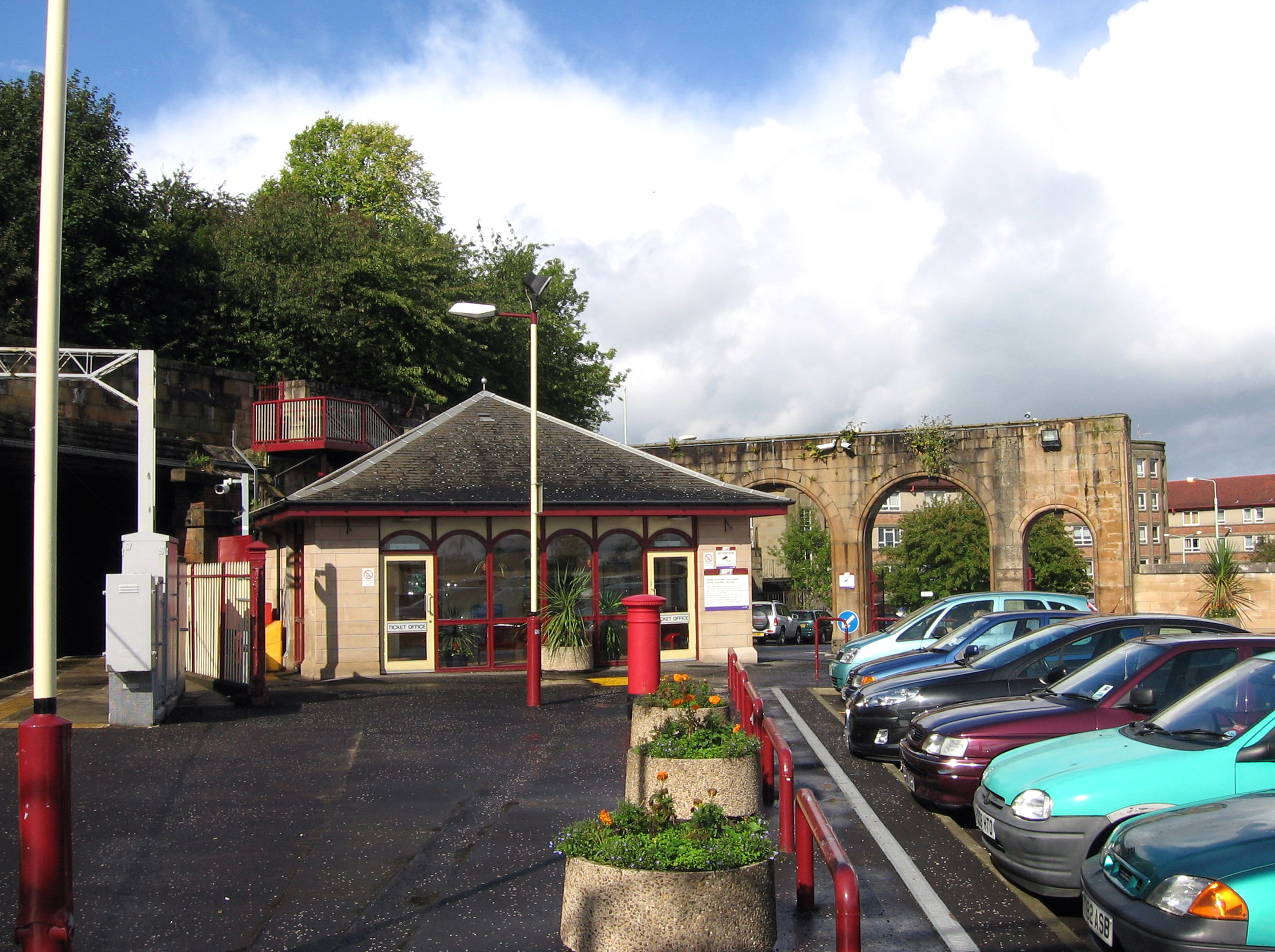
To the left of the new booking office the tunnel west goes under Terrace Road, which is reached by a steel staircase. Station Avenue goes through the stone archway down to Cathcart Street.

The tracks from Glasgow enter at the east end of the wide concourse which is flanked to the north and south by high stone walls, each capped at the east end by a castellated turret. A glazed roof between these walls sheltered the concourse until recently, but it has been removed and small shelters introduced. The northernmost line stops as a bay platform and is not in use, and platform 1 serving eastbound trains opens directly to the top of Station Avenue which slopes down to Cathcart Street through stone archways marking the station entrance. The two tracks in use continue westwards through a tunnel which is capped by the parapet wall to Terrace Road, which leaves Cathcart Street further to the west and rises steeply towards the station before turning south over the tunnel entrance and continuing to rise to the level of the Well Park. Doorways in the parapet wall lead to staircases down to each platform, and to a steel ramp down to Platform 2 serving westbound trains. Originally, there was only one doorway, which led to a sloping passageway which in turn connected with the (now removed) station's internal steel lattice footbridge.

Originally, before electrification, this bridge had both stairs and a ramp for porters' trolleys on the up (westbound) platform, and from the landing above the eastbound platform there was the passageway to the door onto Terrace Road, a staircase down to the platform, and an archway through to an external, stone-flagged ramp down to another archway back into the building and platform area. Thus luggage (which in the 19th century would have consisted of large steamer trunks, and been hauled by a porter on a large four wheeled trolley) could be moved from one platform to the other as required.

At electrification in 1967, the steel lattice footbridge span above the tracks was raised several feet, and steps inserted at each end, to provide extra clearance for the 25 kV overhead wires, at the same time the up platform ramp to the bridge was removed as the steps in the span meant that trolleys could no longer use the bridge, however the luggage habits of passengers had changed significantly so this was not seen as a problem, the idea of wheelchair/disabled accessibility being still several decades in the future at the time.

The internal footbridge was entirely removed in the late 1990s, and an all-new stairway leading to a new doorway onto Terrace Road was built to replace it, leaving the current situation where passengers needing to cross from one platform to the other must do so via Terrace Road.

The original booking office was demolished around the early 1990s, being replaced for a time by a portable building and now that the glazed roof has been removed a small booking office with a hipped roof has been added, with the north side of the concourse being made into a car park.

== Services ==
The typical off-peak service in trains per hour is:

- 2 tph to Glasgow Central via Paisley Gilmour Street
- 2 tph to Gourock

Additional trains call at the station during peak hours.

Preceding station	National Rail	Following station
Greenock West	ScotRail; Inverclyde Line	Cartsdyke or Port Glasgow
	Historical railways	
Greenock West	Caledonian Railway; Glasgow, Paisley and Greenock Railway	Cartsdyke
