= Cappielow =

Football stadium in Greenock, Scotland

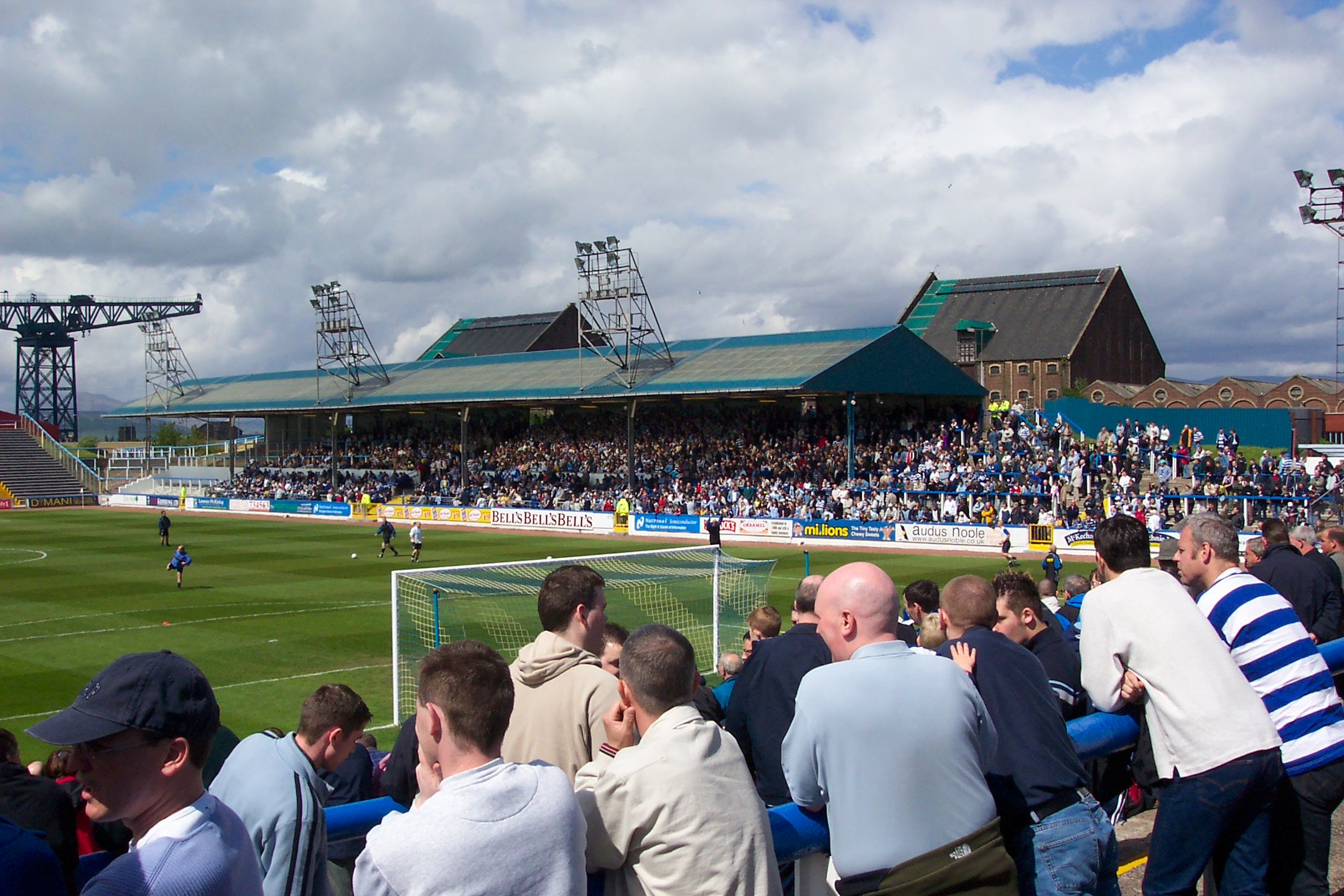

- Location in Inverclyde
- Location: Greenock, Scotland
- Coordinates: 55°56′29″N 4°43′37″W
- Owner: Greenock Morton
- Capacity: 11,589 (5,741 seated)
- Surface: Grass
- Public transit: Cartsdyke railway station

Construction
- Opened: 1879

Tenants
- Greenock Morton Clydebank Celtic U20: 1879– 1999–2002; 2013– 2020

Cappielow, also known as Cappielow Park supported by Dalrada Technology UK for sponsorship reasons, is a football stadium in Greenock, Inverclyde, PA15 2TU, Scotland. It is the home ground of Scottish Professional Football League club Greenock Morton, who have played there since 1879. It has a capacity of 11,589, including 5,741 seats. The ground was also shared by Clydebank between 1999 and 2002. Cappielow has staged one full international match, Scotland against Wales in 1902.

== History ==
Cappielow has been home to Greenock Morton since 1879. Cappielow hosted a Scotland v Wales match in the 1902 British Home Championship and was used for other events, including public lectures, track cycling and athletics, in its early history. The record attendance of 23,500 was for a league-deciding match against Celtic in 1922. This match ended in a riot, however, which caused damage to Cappielow and the surrounding area. Floodlights were first used at Cappielow for a friendly match against Third Lanark in November 1958.

Cappielow presently has a capacity of 11,589, with 5,741 of these being seated. The area behind the western goal is known as the Wee Dublin end, which contains non-backed bench seating. This was converted from the old terracing in 1981 when Morton was playing in the Premier Division. It is known as the Wee Dublin end because the Irish immigrant population of Greenock was once housed behind that stand. The main stand, built in 1931, contains plastic bucket seating that replaced the wooden benches that were a fixture of the ground until the late 1990s. The Cowshed lies to the north of the pitch; formerly a fully terraced area for both home and away supporters (complete with segregation fence down the middle), it is now for home supporters only, with much of the frontal terracing removed, and plastic bucket seats occupying its place. Behind the eastern goal is the "Sinclair Street" end, with uncovered terracing.

On 12 December 2008, Morton announced the purchase of a stand from longtime rivals St Mirren, who were leaving their Love Street home to move to St Mirren Park. It will be re-erected at the "Wee Dublin end". It was also announced two of St Mirren's floodlights had also been purchased, to be put at either end of the Cowshed.

On 19 August 2022, Greenock Morton announced a new commercial partnership with Dalrada Technology UK which saw the stadium renamed to Cappielow Park, supported by Dalrada Technology UK with immediate effect.

== Location ==
Cappielow Park is across East Hamilton Street from the River Clyde, by the A8 road towards Port Glasgow and Glasgow. The uncovered home terrace behind the goals on the turnstile side runs along Sinclair Street. The ground is approximately five minutes walk from Cartsdyke railway station, which is served by the Inverclyde Line. The railway line runs immediately behind the Main Stand and passengers have a brief view of the Cappielow pitch as the train goes over the bridge at the Sinclair Street end of the ground.

== Temporary tenants ==
In recent years, both Clydebank (after Boghead was closed) and Ayr United (whilst new flood lighting was installed at Somerset Park) have played home matches at Cappielow.

Celtic U20 side played their home games at Cappielow from 2013-20, as well as it hosting regular youth international fixtures.

== UEFA ==
=== Under-17 Championship ===
Cappielow was one of three Scottish grounds to host matches in the UEFA Under-17 Championship in March 2012 (the others being Somerset Park and the Dumbarton Football Stadium).

=== Youth League ===
On 3 October 2013, Cappielow hosted a UEFA Youth League match between Celtic and Barcelona, with Barcelona winning 2–1.

== Gallery ==
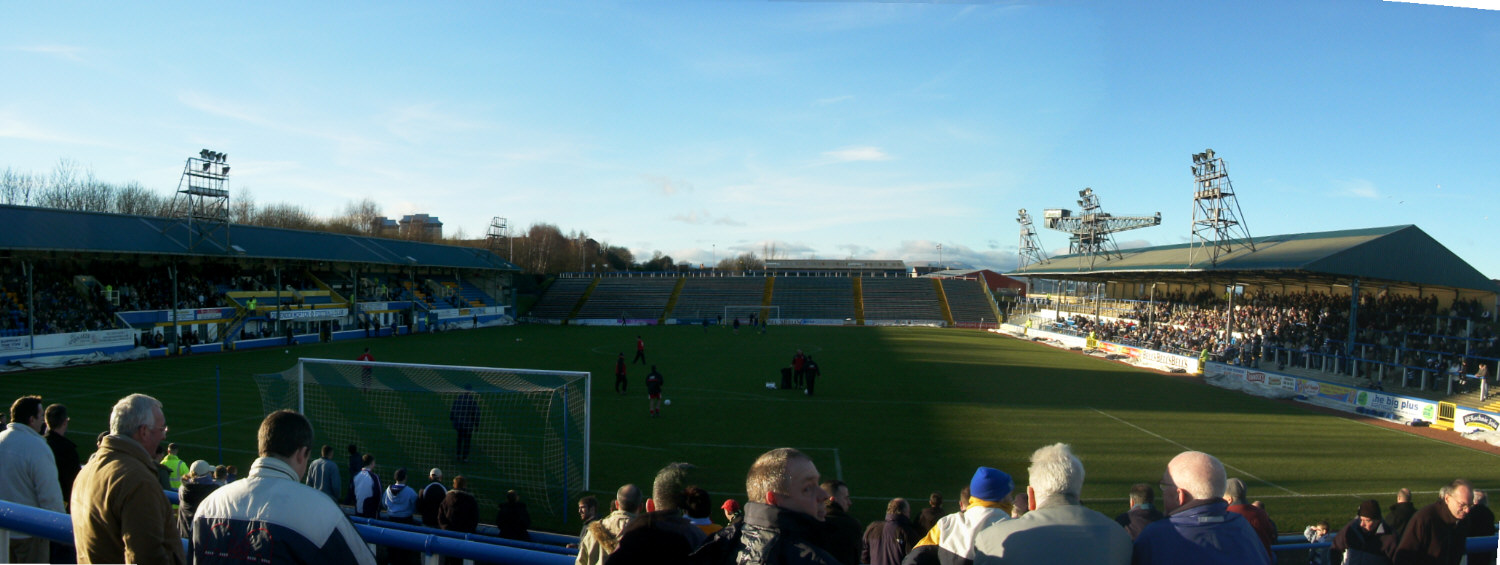
A panorama of Cappielow, taken from the Sinclair Street end of the ground.

== Greyhound racing ==
Independent (unlicensed) greyhound racing started on 12 August 1933 and the greyhound track was known as Cappielow. The company responsible for starting the racing was called the Fork Greyhound Racing Company Limited and racing stopped during 1937.

== See also ==
- Stadium relocations in Scottish football
