= Woodhall, Port Glasgow =

Housing scheme in Inverclyde, Scotland

Coordinates: 55°55′48″N 4°39′3″W

Woodhall is a housing scheme in the lower east end of Port Glasgow, Inverclyde in Scotland. It stands on land once occupied by Woodhall mansion and estate. The mansion stood where St Martin's church now stands on Mansion Avenue. Woodhall is on a north facing slope, overlooking the River Clyde and is bounded on the north by the River Clyde, on the south by Parkhill Avenue, on the west by Port Glasgow cemetery and on the east by what is now the Castlebank housing estate which is on the site of the former Broadfield Hospital.

== History ==
Built in the 1930s as the town expanded eastwards, Woodhall was a thriving community centred on Woodhall Square and the adjoining Woodhall Terrace at the foot of the hill. Mansion Avenue and Heggies Avenue climb up the steep hill to opposite ends of Parkhill Avenue, whilst Brightside, Pleasantside and Sunnyside Avenues (plus a branch of Mansion Avenue) follow the contours of the hill and are therefore reasonably flat.

Woodhall Terrace consisted of fine red sandstone tenements along the south side of the A8 Glasgow Road. Woodhall Square was a major bus terminus, with a service every ten minutes to Gourock at peak times and hourly "through" services to Glasgow and Largs. Dino's Italian Cafe and shop stood in the square and was popular with day-trippers heading for the bus to Gourock or those going by foot to picnic at nearby Parklea on the banks of the Clyde.

There was a busy Co-op grocery shop on Brightside Avenue at the junction with Mansion Avenue, one of several local Co-op shops in Port Glasgow. Further up the hill, Parkhill Square was also a bus terminus until the late 1960s at which time the buses started to run on up the hill to Oronsay Avenue in Park Farm and Bardrainney.

== Industry ==
There was no industry in the area until a small industrial estate named Kelburn Business Park opened in the 1980s, alongside the realigned A8 dual carriageway. Two of the three units are occupied by Vango and White House Products Ltd, the third unit was vacated by Chinese company Amphenol in 2001.

The adjacent Woodhall Park, which was home to Port Glasgow F.C., better known as The Port Juniors, was cleared and zoned for industrial use by Inverclyde Council in 2000 - the land remained derelict for twelve years until the business park was extended in 2013/14.

== 2009 ==
All but one of the tenements on Woodhall Terrace were demolished in 2002, along with many of the houses on "the avenues" and all of the houses on and to the east of Parkhill Square, leaving the area with a forlorn, ghost-town look today. Dino has long gone, but the building survives and is occupied by a Post Office and licensed grocer. The Co-op building on Brightside has become Riverview Resource Centre. St Martin's Church and hall are still there, behind a stockade-like fence. Further along Mansion Avenue is Tree Tops Nursery, standing alone on a street where the houses have all been demolished.

== The future ==
Plans by River Clyde Homes to build new houses on Parkhill Avenue were reported by local newspaper The Greenock Telegraph on 29 January 2009.

== Public transport ==
The area is served by Woodhall railway station on the Inverclyde Line which has regular services to and from Glasgow Central and Gourock, and also Wemyss Bay during early mornings and evenings only. Local buses run from Greenock town centre to Oronsay Avenue via Heggies Avenue every twenty minutes at peak times.

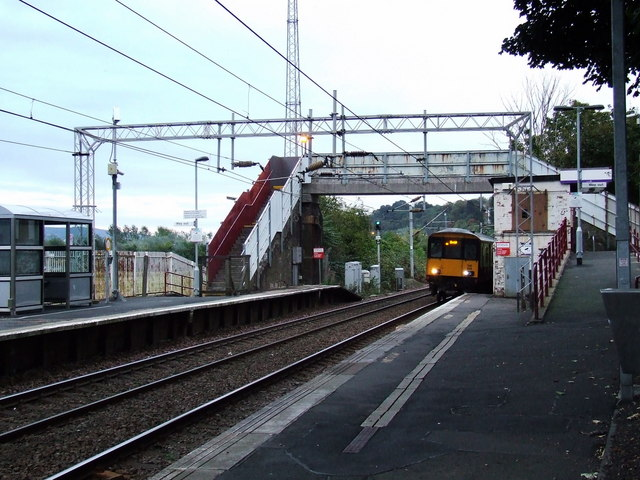
Class 318 at Woodhall railway station in 2007

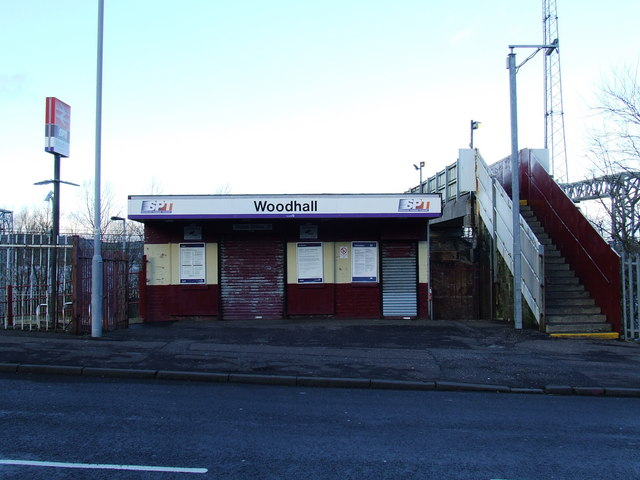
Woodhall railway station in 2007
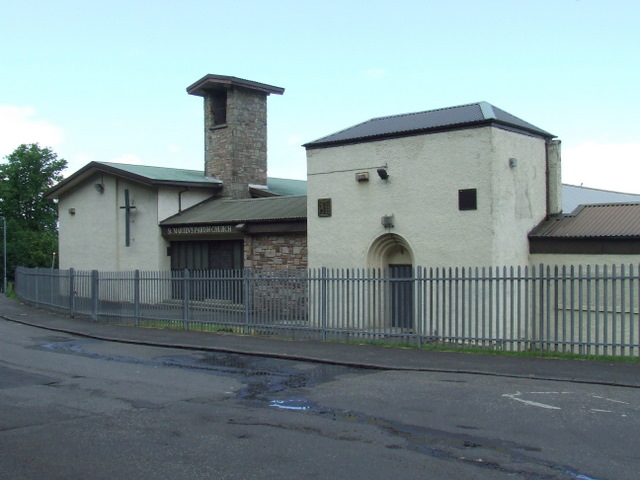
St Martin's Parish Church

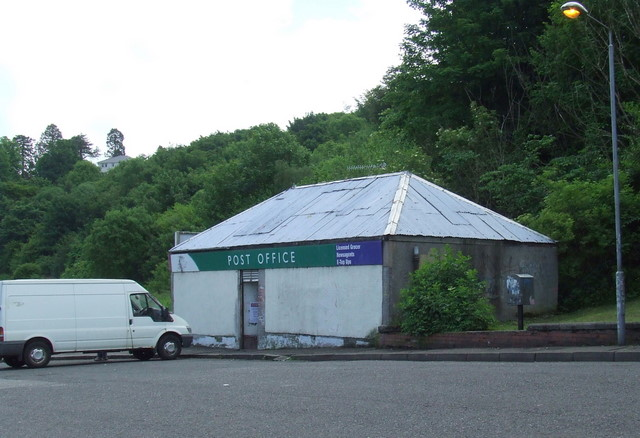
Former Dino's Cafe

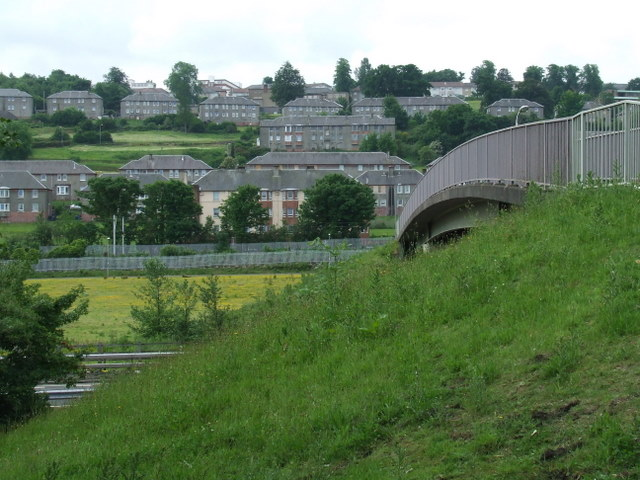
Woodhall from Kelburn Park

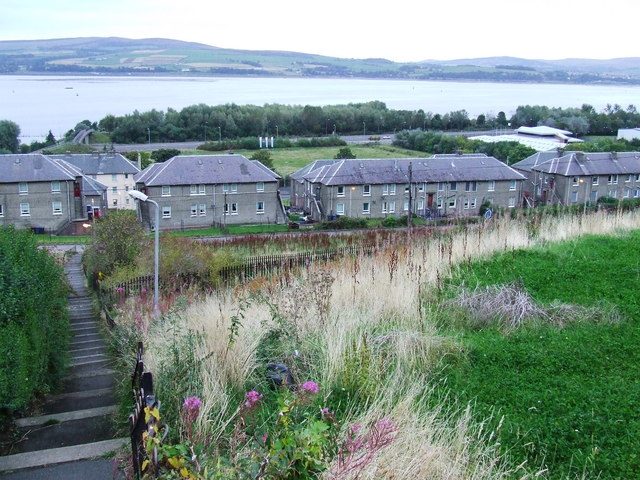
Pleasantside from Sunnyside

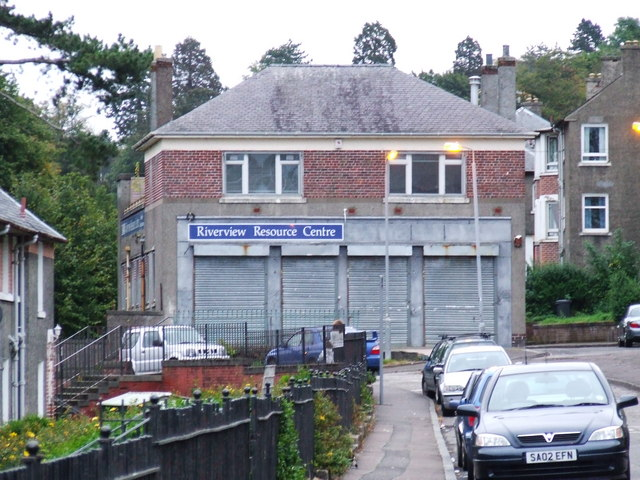
Former Brightside Co-op

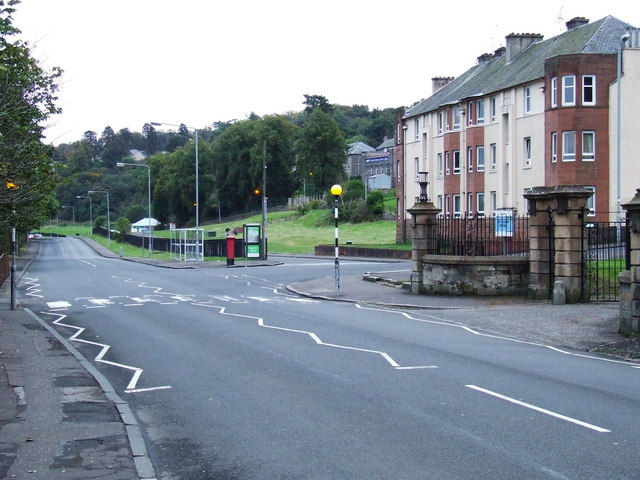
The last remaining tenement on Woodhall Terrace

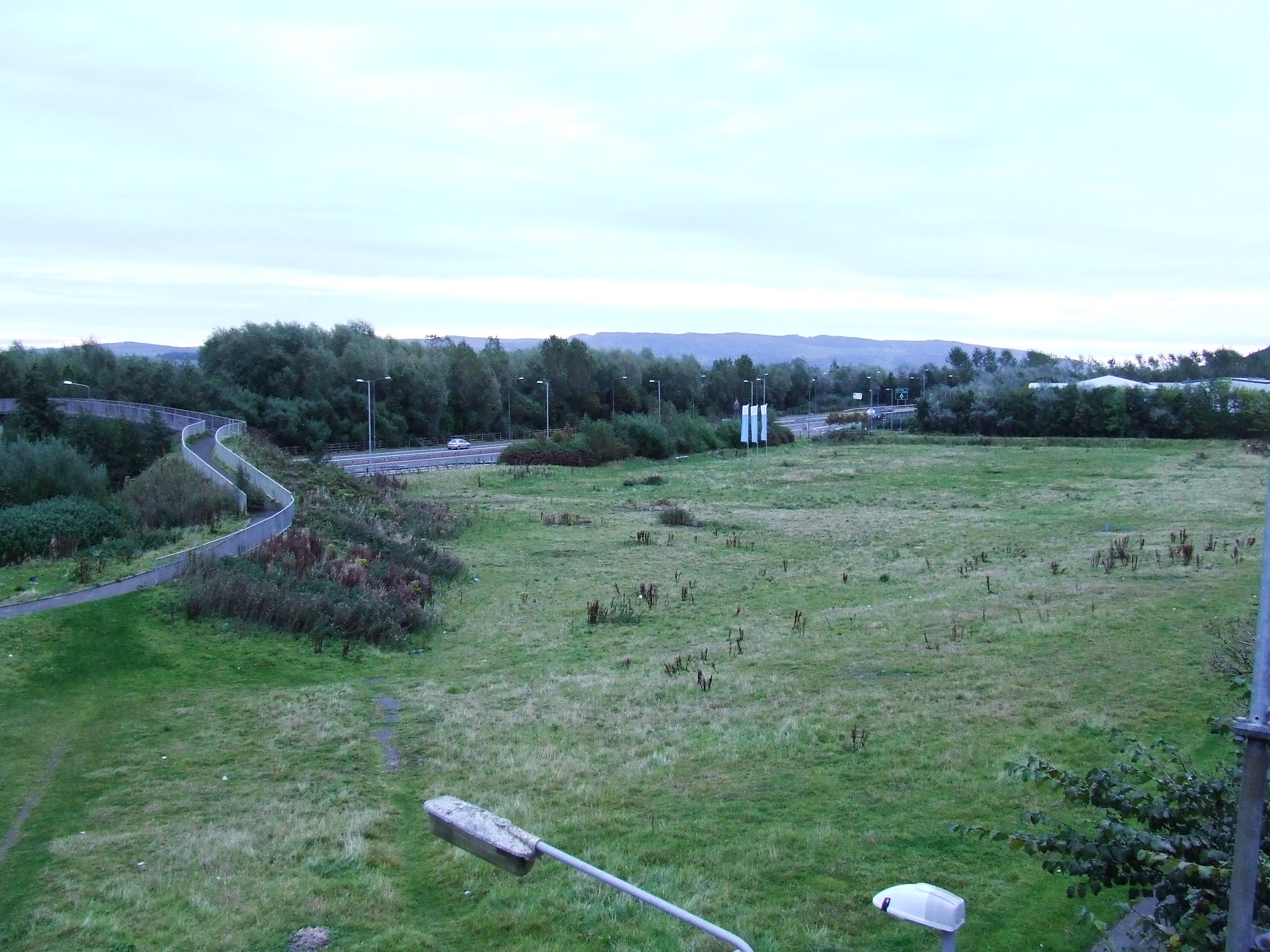
Former home of Port Glasgow Juniors FC

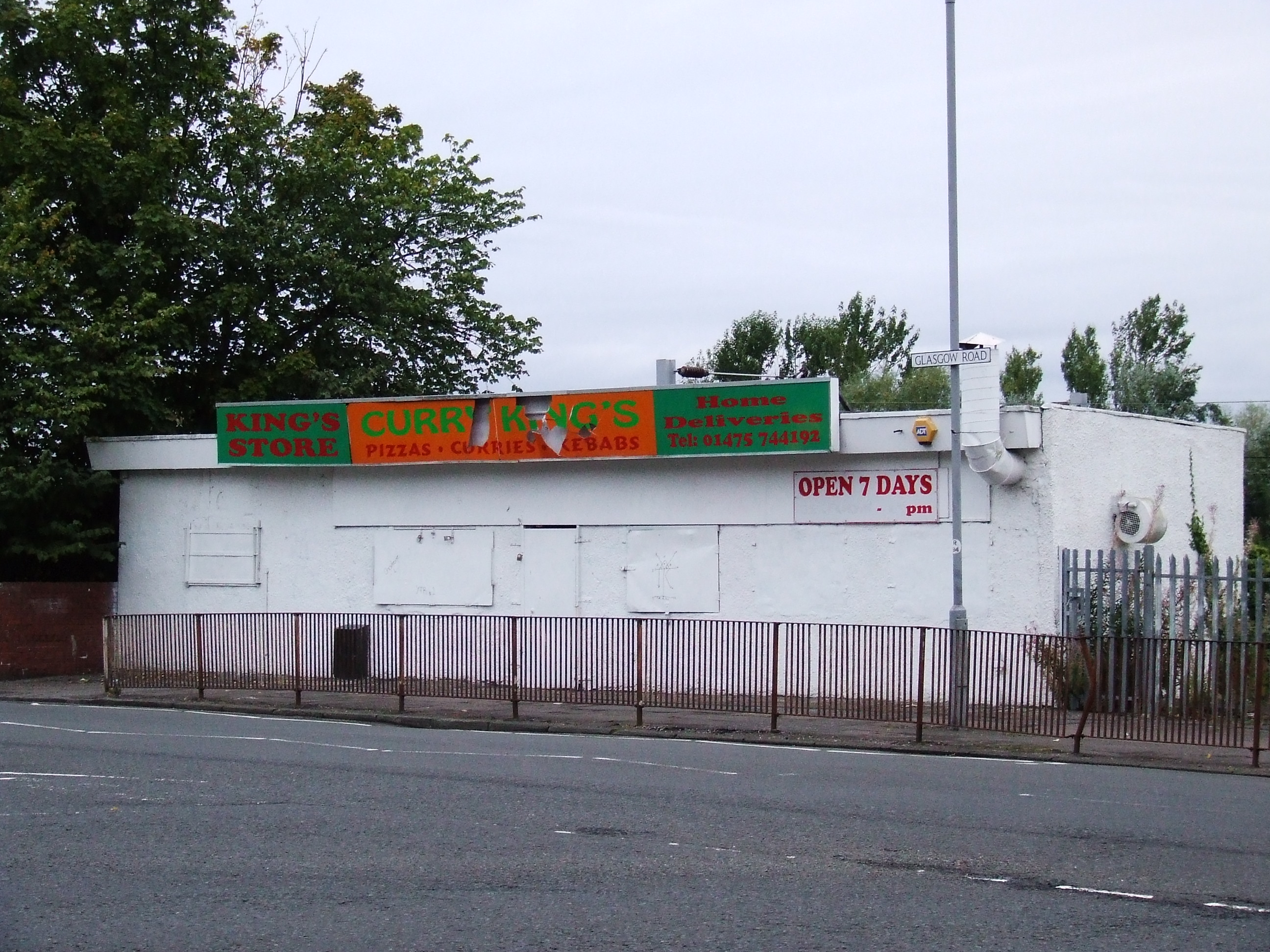
Former cafe, newsagents and chippy near Woodhall railway station
