= Cartsdyke railway station =

Railway station in Inverclyde, Scotland

Cartsdyke
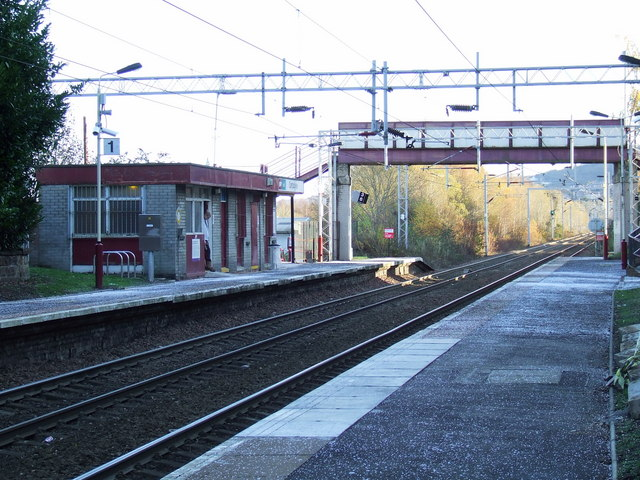
- Cartsdyke station

General information
- Location: Cartsdyke, Inverclyde; Scotland
- Coordinates: 55.9422°N 4.7324°W
- Grid reference: NS294754
- Manager: ScotRail
- Platforms: 2

Other information
- Station code: CDY

Passengers
- 2021/22: ▲60,528
- 2022/23: ▲75,522
- 2023/24: ▲95,612
- 2024/25: ▲99,116
- 2025/26: ▲0.102 million
Location
Notes
- Passenger statistics from the Office of Rail and Road

Cartsdyke railway station serves part of the town of Greenock, Scotland. The station is on the Inverclyde Line, 22 miles (35 km) west of Glasgow Central.

The station is situated between Bawhirley Road and McDougall Street and it serves passengers going to and from Gourock and Glasgow.

It is the nearest station to Cappielow, home of Greenock Morton F.C. Aside from the daily commuter traffic, some Saturday afternoons consequently are the busiest period of time for this station, which is only staffed for a few hours each day.

== Services ==
The typical off-peak service in trains per hour is:

- 2 tph to Glasgow Central via Paisley Gilmour Street
- 2 tph to Gourock

Additional trains call at the station during peak hours.

Preceding station	National Rail	Following station
Greenock Central	ScotRail; Inverclyde Line	Bogston
	Historical railways	
Greenock Central	Caledonian Railway; Glasgow, Paisley and Greenock Railway	Bogston
