= Langbank railway station =

Railway station in Renfrewshire, Scotland

Langbank Scottish Gaelic: A' Bhruach Fhada
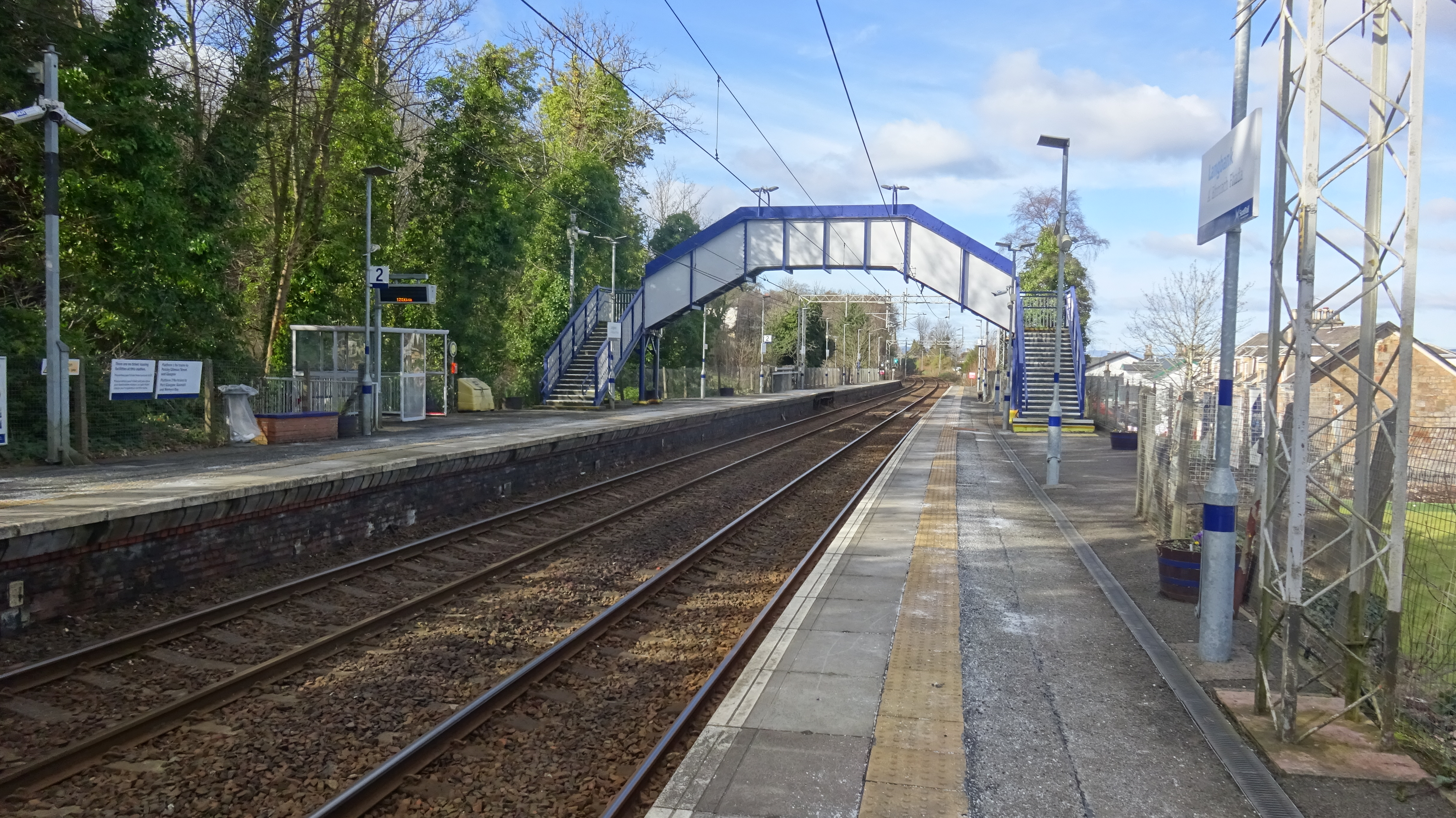
- General view of Langbank station looking west from Platform 1

General information
- Location: Langbank, Renfrewshire; Scotland
- Coordinates: 55.9247°N 4.5864°W
- Grid reference: NS385731
- Manager: ScotRail
- Platforms: 2

Other information
- Station code: LGB

Key dates
- 29 March 1841: Opened as Lang Bank
- 1 May 1853: Renamed Langbank

Passengers
- 2021/22: ▲45,940
- 2022/23: ▲59,348
- 2023/24: ▲66,754
- 2024/25: ▼62,206
- 2025/26: ▼61,670
Location
Notes
- Passenger statistics from the Office of Rail and Road

Langbank railway station serves the village of Langbank in Renfrewshire, Scotland. The station is on the Inverclyde Line, 16 miles (26 km) west of Glasgow Central.

== Services ==
As of March 2025, the typical off-peak daytime service in trains per hour (tph) is:

- 2 tph to Glasgow Central
- 2 tph to Wemyss Bay

Additional trains to Gourock call at the station during peak hours. During the evenings, all trains run to Gourock, with trains to Wemyss bay passing through without stopping.

On Sundays, there is an hourly service between Glasgow Central and Gourock.

Preceding station	National Rail	Following station
Woodhall	ScotRail; Inverclyde Line	Bishopton
	Historical railways	
Port Glasgow	Caledonian Railway; Glasgow, Paisley and Greenock Railway	Bishopton
