= Woodhall railway station =

Railway station in Inverclyde, Scotland

Woodhall Scottish Gaelic: Taigh na Coille
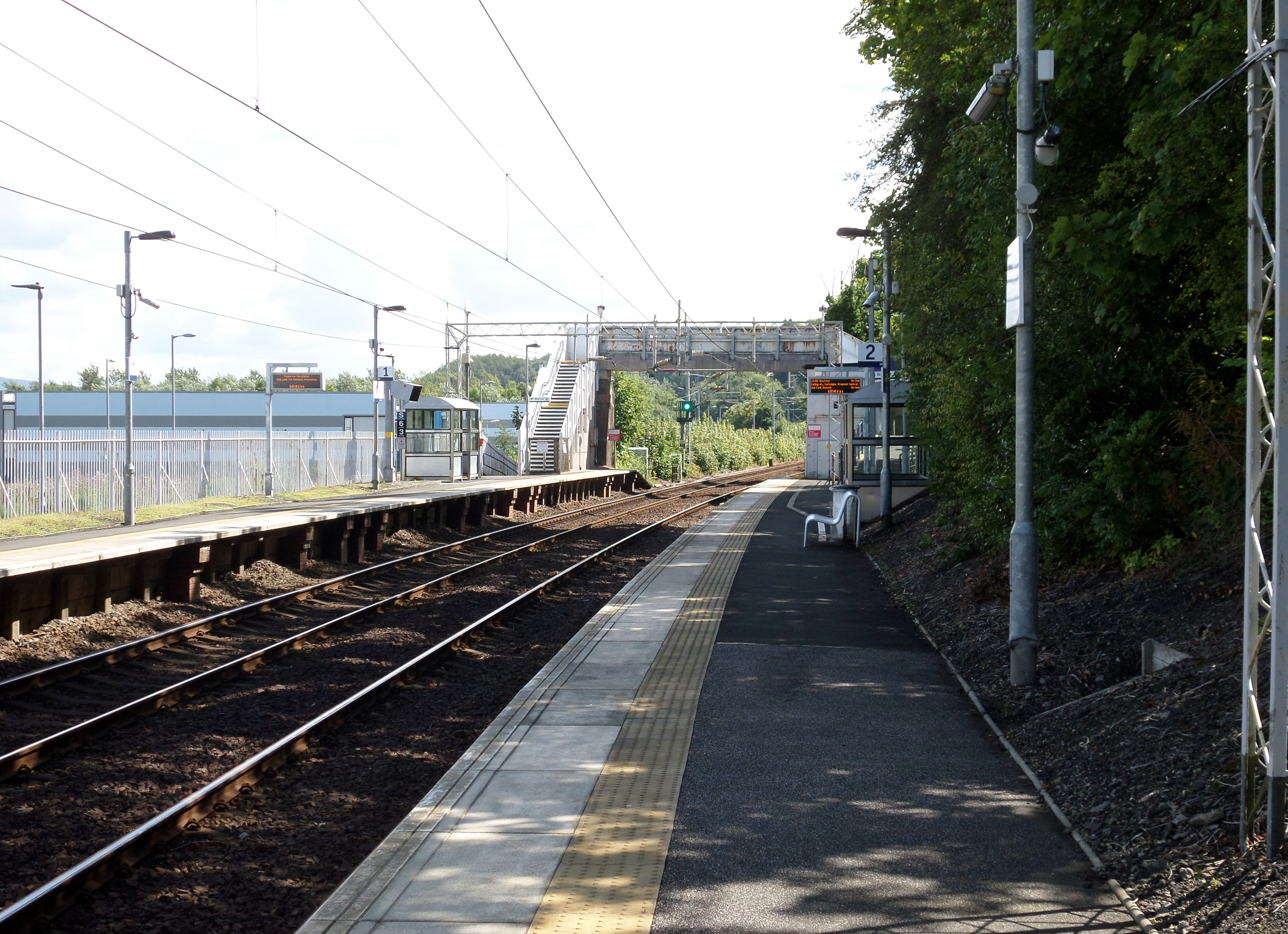
- Woodhall station, looking east towards Glasgow Central. The footbridge can be seen in the background.

General information
- Location: Woodhall, Inverclyde; Scotland
- Coordinates: 55.9315°N 4.6567°W
- Grid reference: NS341741
- Manager: ScotRail
- Platforms: 2

Other information
- Station code: WDL

Key dates
- 1 October 1945: Opened

Passengers
- 2021/22: ▲27,926
- 2022/23: ▲37,114
- 2023/24: ▲47,208
- 2024/25: ▲48,326
- 2025/26: ▼43,796
Location
Notes
- Passenger statistics from the Office of Rail and Road

Woodhall railway station serves the eastern part of the town of Port Glasgow in Inverclyde, Scotland. The station is sited in the Woodhall area and is 19 miles (31 km) west of Glasgow Central on the Inverclyde Line.

Woodhall station is staffed only on Monday to Saturday in the daytime.

== Services ==
As of March 2025, the typical off-peak daytime service in trains per hour (tph) is:

- 2 tph to Glasgow Central
- 2 tph to Wemyss Bay

Additional trains to Gourock call at the station during peak hours. During the evenings, all trains run to Gourock, with trains to Wemyss bay passing through without stopping.

On Sundays, there is an hourly service between Glasgow Central and Gourock.

| Preceding station | National Rail | Following station |
|---|---|---|
| Port Glasgow | ScotRail; Inverclyde Line | Langbank |

== Gallery ==
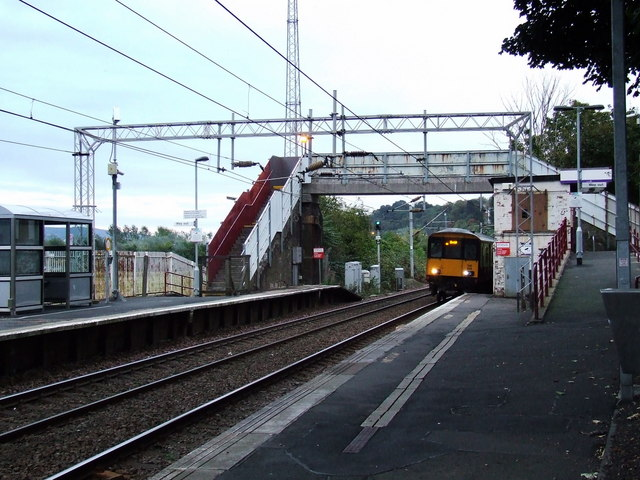
Gourock bound train enters from the east. The ticket office, to the right of the train, is now used at peak times only.

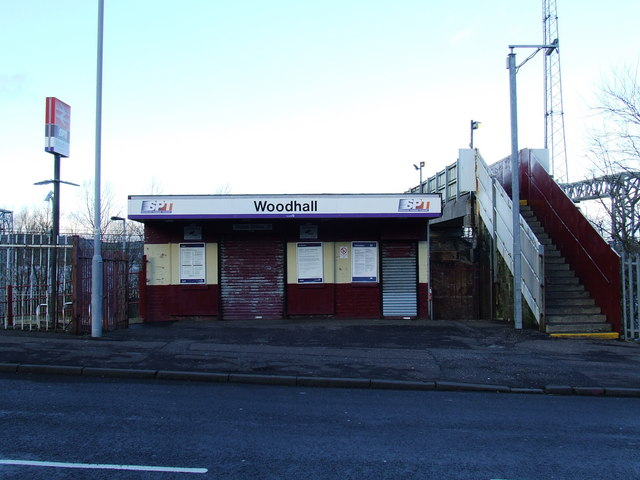
Woodhall station, as seen from Glasgow Road in the east end of Port Glasgow (2007)

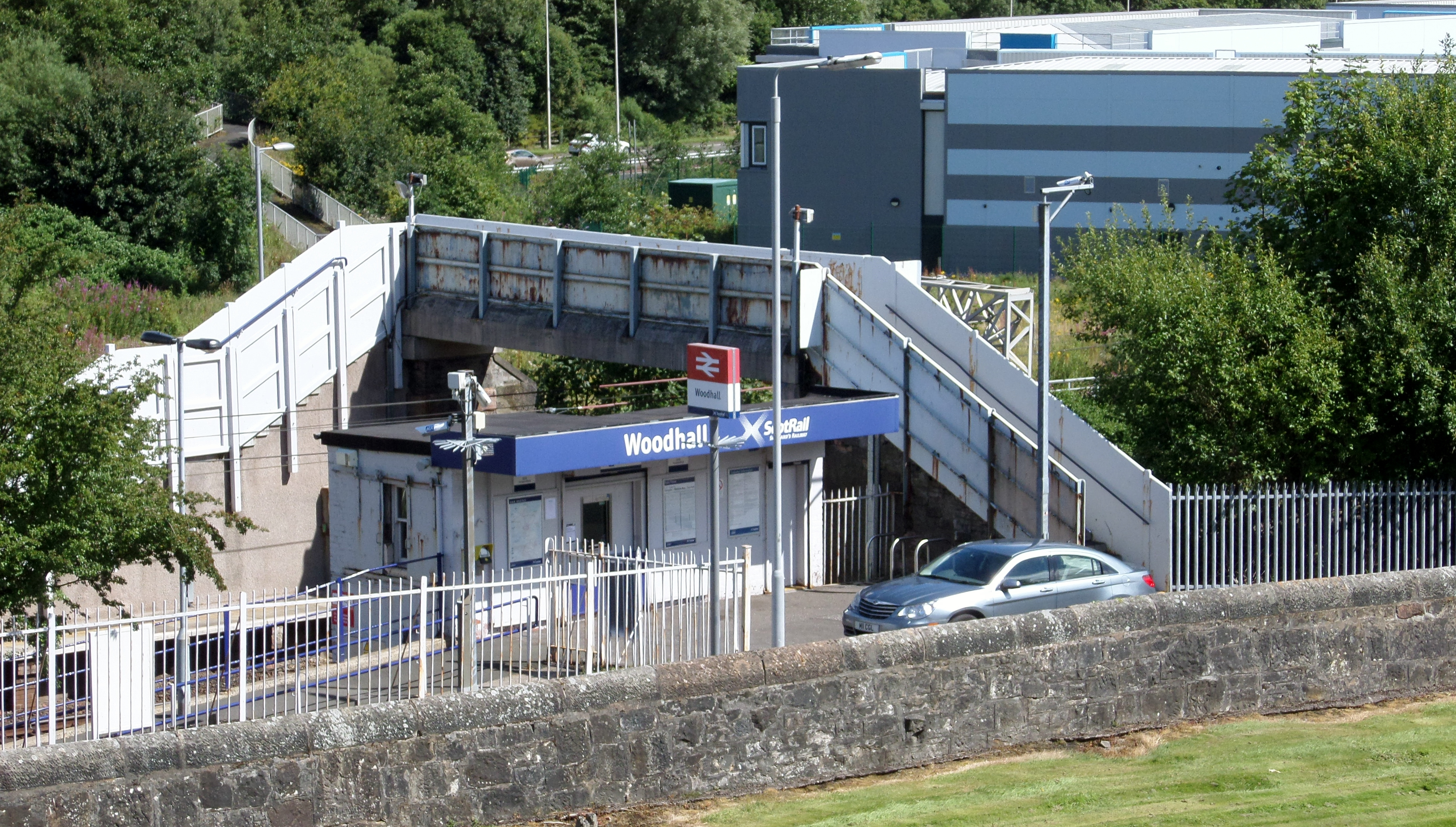
The ticket office in 2017
