= Bogston railway station =

Railway station in Inverclyde, Scotland

Bogston
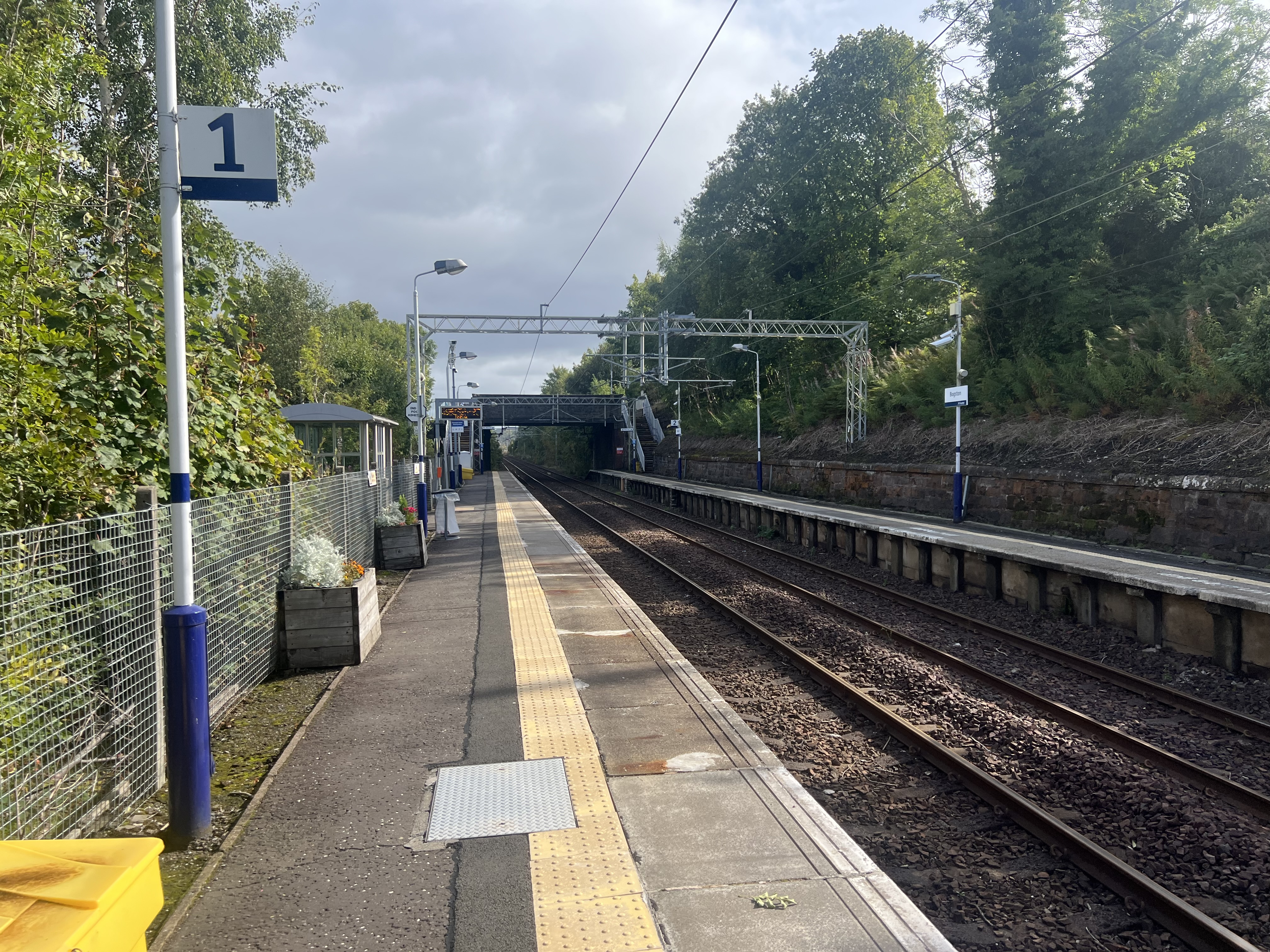
- In the east end of Greenock, on the Glasgow-Gourock line. The Glasgow-Wemyss Bay line runs atop the embankment on the right.

General information
- Location: Bogston, Inverclyde; Scotland
- Coordinates: 55.9372°N 4.7124°W
- Grid reference: NS306748
- Manager: ScotRail
- Platforms: 2

Other information
- Station code: BGS

Passengers
- 2021/22: ▲16,298
- 2022/23: ▲19,470
- 2023/24: ▲23,616
- 2024/25: ▲27,266
- 2025/26: ▲28,362
Location
Notes
- Passenger statistics from the Office of Rail and Road

Bogston railway station is on the Inverclyde Line, at Bogston in the East end of Greenock in Inverclyde council area, Scotland. The station is 21 3/4 miles (35 km) west of Glasgow Central.

In past years the station had a goods yard serving the adjacent ship yards and nearby was the Ladyburn locomotive shed (shedplate 66D). The immediately adjacent line from Port Glasgow to Wemyss Bay passes Bogston using a railway line positioned at a higher level. However this route has never served Bogston.

== Service ==
The typical off-peak service in trains per hour is:

- 2 tph to Glasgow Central via Paisley Gilmour Street
- 2 tph to Gourock

Additional trains call at the station during peak hours.

Preceding station	National Rail	Following station
Cartsdyke	ScotRail; Inverclyde Line	Port Glasgow
	Historical railways	
Cartsdyke	Caledonian Railway; Glasgow, Paisley and Greenock Railway	Port Glasgow
