= Bogston =

Coordinates: 55.93873°N 4.70571°W

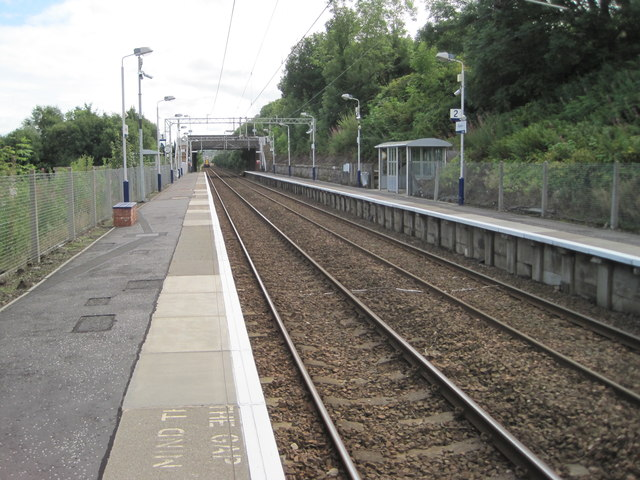

Bogston (Scots: Bogstoun, Scottish Gaelic: Baile na Fèithe) is an area of the towns of Port Glasgow and Greenock in the council area of Inverclyde, Scotland. It is 35 km (21¾ miles) west of Glasgow.

The area is served by Bogston railway station.
