= Port Glasgow railway station =

Railway station in Inverclyde, Scotland

Port Glasgow Scottish Gaelic: Port Ghlaschu
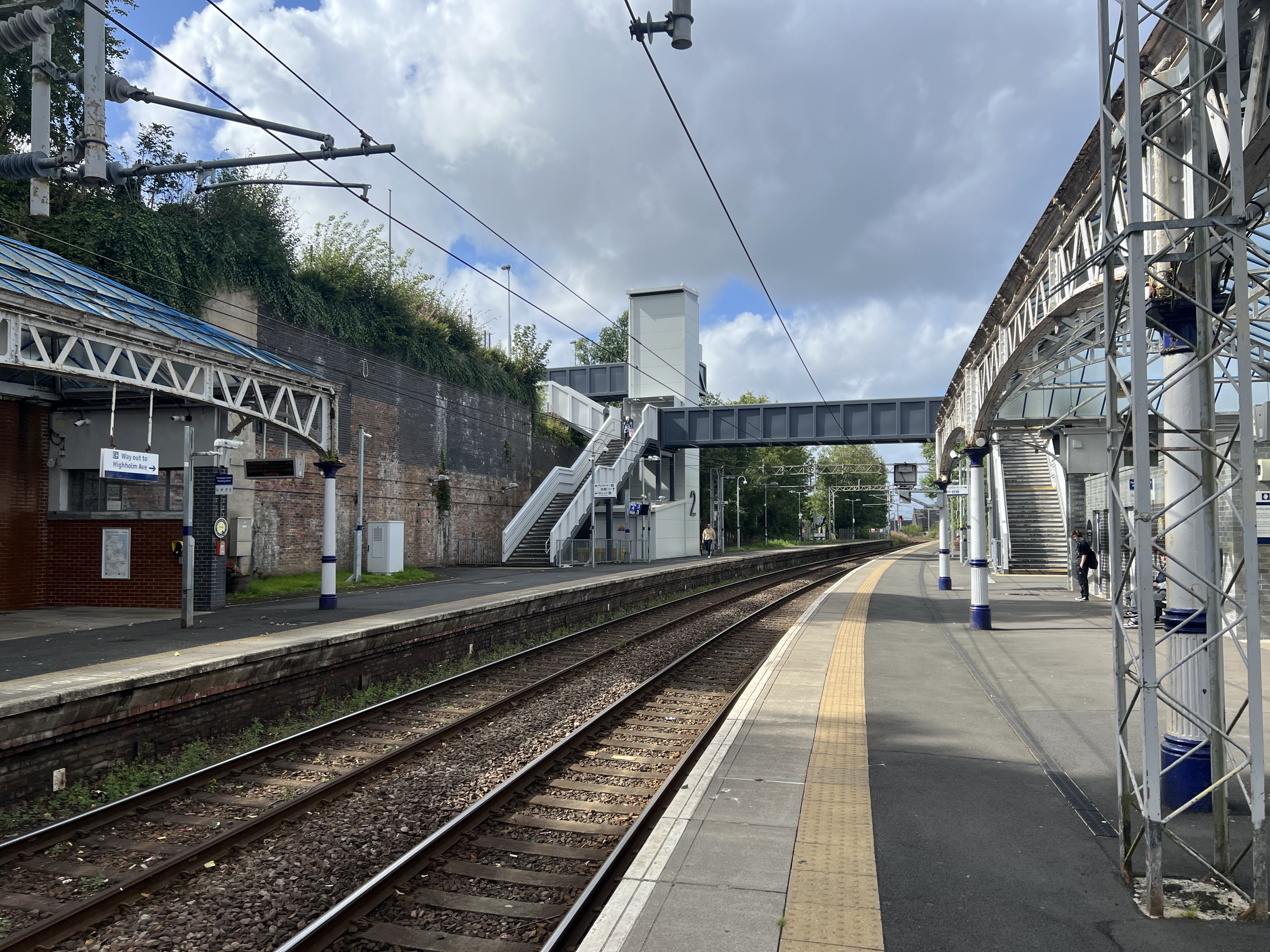

General information
- Location: Port Glasgow, Inverclyde; Scotland
- Coordinates: 55.9335°N 4.6902°W
- Grid reference: NS320744
- Manager: ScotRail
- Platforms: 2

Other information
- Station code: PTG

Key dates
- 31 March 1841: Opened

Passengers
- 2021/22: ▲0.259 million
- Interchange: ▲2,259
- 2022/23: ▲0.324 million
- Interchange: ▲2,534
- 2023/24: ▲0.378 million
- Interchange: ▲5,326
- 2024/25: ▲0.391 million
- Interchange: ▲9,767
- 2025/26: ▲0.403 million
- Interchange: ▼9,654
Location
Notes
- Passenger statistics from the Office of Rail and Road

Port Glasgow railway station is on the Inverclyde Line, serving the town of Port Glasgow, Scotland. It is located in the town centre with the main entrance at the junction of Princes Street and John Wood Street.

It opened on 31 March 1841, being one of the intermediate stations on the Glasgow, Paisley and Greenock Railway which opened on that date. It later became a junction in 1865, when the branch to Wemyss Bay was opened. The main line was then extended to Gourock in 1889 by the Caledonian Railway.

The two lines diverge to the west of the station, with the Wemyss Bay branch now mostly single track all the way to the terminus; the Gourock line is double throughout. Both lines were electrified in 1967 by British Rail using the 25 kV AC system, with the branch partially singled as part of the modernisation work. A (now disused) connection to the former Glasgow and South Western Railway station at Greenock diverged from the branch line a short distance west of the junction. The old station was used for a period (circa 1971–84) as a container terminal but was officially closed in September 1991.

There was a bay platform at the west end of the station for services to Wemyss Bay. The platform was located on the south side of the line and is now infilled – prior to electrification, it was used for carriages which were added to (and on return detached from) Wemyss Bay trains.

== Services ==
Port Glasgow is one of only two stations on the Inverclyde line at which all passenger services stop, the other being Bishopton. Typically during the day, services originating from Gourock provide fast services to Glasgow, calling at Bishopton, Paisley Gilmour Street and Glasgow Central, whereas services originating from Wemyss Bay call at all stations en route to Glasgow Central. During the evening however, this pattern is typically reversed, with Wemyss Bay trains running fast and calling only at the aforementioned stations, with services from Gourock providing the stopping services.

As of November 2024, the typical off-peak service in trains per hour (tph) is:

- 4 tph to Glasgow Central (2 stopping, 2 fast)
- 2 tph to Gourock
- 2 tph to Wemyss Bay

Additional trains call at the station during peak hours.

During the evenings and on Sundays, the service between Glasgow Central and Wemyss Bay is reduced to hourly.

Preceding station	National Rail	Following station
Bogston	ScotRail; Inverclyde Line (to Gourock)	Woodhall or Bishopton
Whinhill	ScotRail; Inverclyde Line (to Wemyss Bay)	Woodhall or Bishopton
	Historical railways	
Bogston; Line and station open	Caledonian Railway; Glasgow, Paisley and Greenock Railway	Langbank; Line and station open
Upper Greenock; Line open; station closed	Caledonian Railway; Greenock and Wemyss Bay Railway	connection to Glasgow, Paisley and Greenock Railway

== Gallery ==
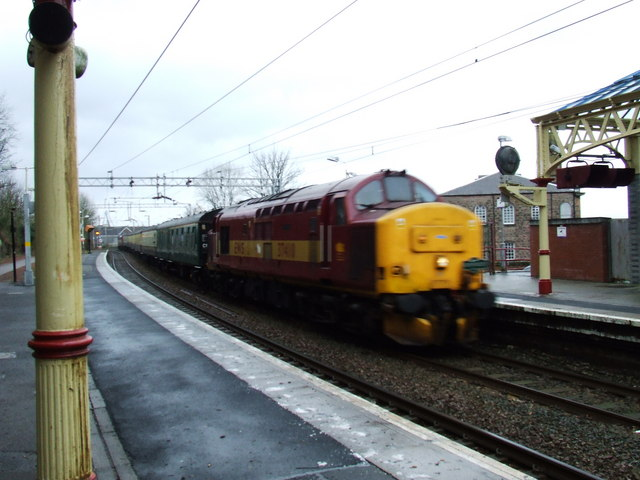
A ten-coach enthusiasts' special passing through Port Glasgow station. The rear loco carried a plate bearing "Pathfinder Tours". Such trains are not a common sight on this line. St Andrews church can be seen in the background.

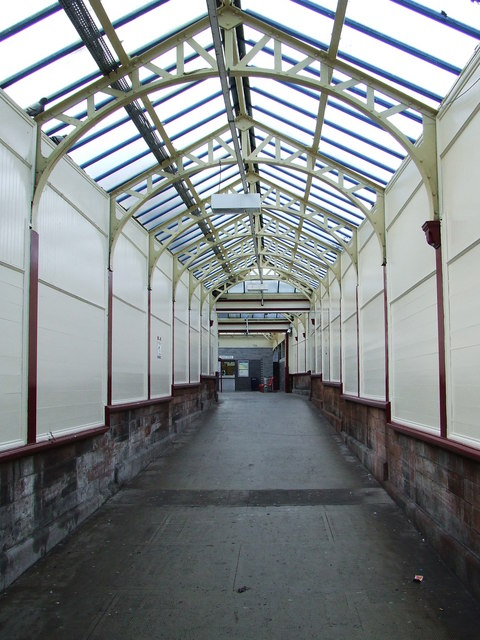
Covered walkway leading from the main station entrance on Princes Street to the concourse and ticket office

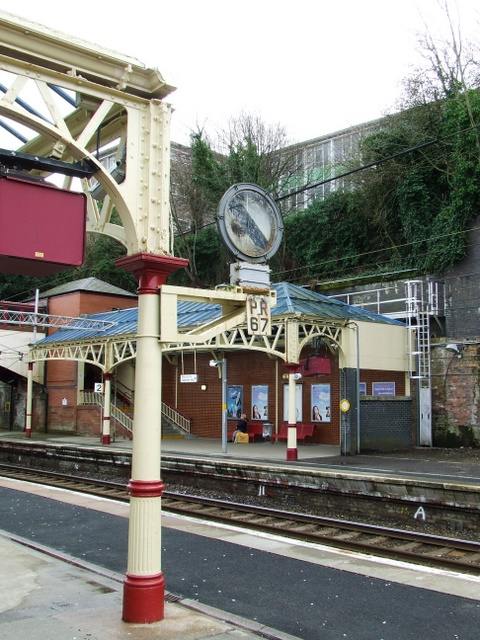
A banner repeater signal on the Glasgow-bound platform

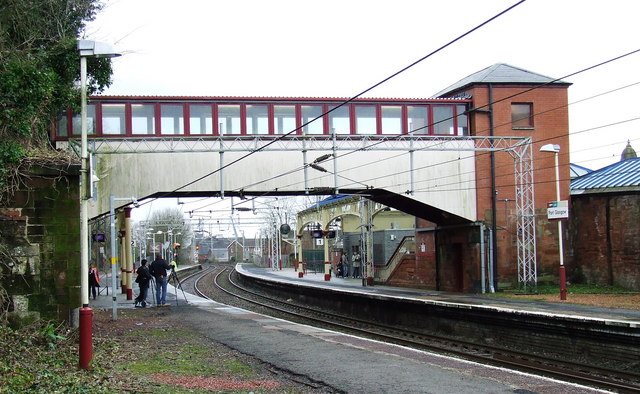
Trainspotters turn out to see a special train at Port Glasgow

== Sources ==
- Butt, R. V. J. (October 1995). The Directory of Railway Stations: details every public and private passenger station, halt, platform and stopping place, past and present (1st ed.). Sparkford: Patrick Stephens Ltd. ISBN 978-1-85260-508-7. OCLC 60251199. OL 11956311M.
- Jowett, Alan (March 1989). Jowett's Railway Atlas of Great Britain and Ireland: From Pre-Grouping to the Present Day (1st ed.). Sparkford: Patrick Stephens Ltd. ISBN 978-1-85260-086-0. OCLC 22311137.
