= Inverclyde Line =

Railway line in Scotland

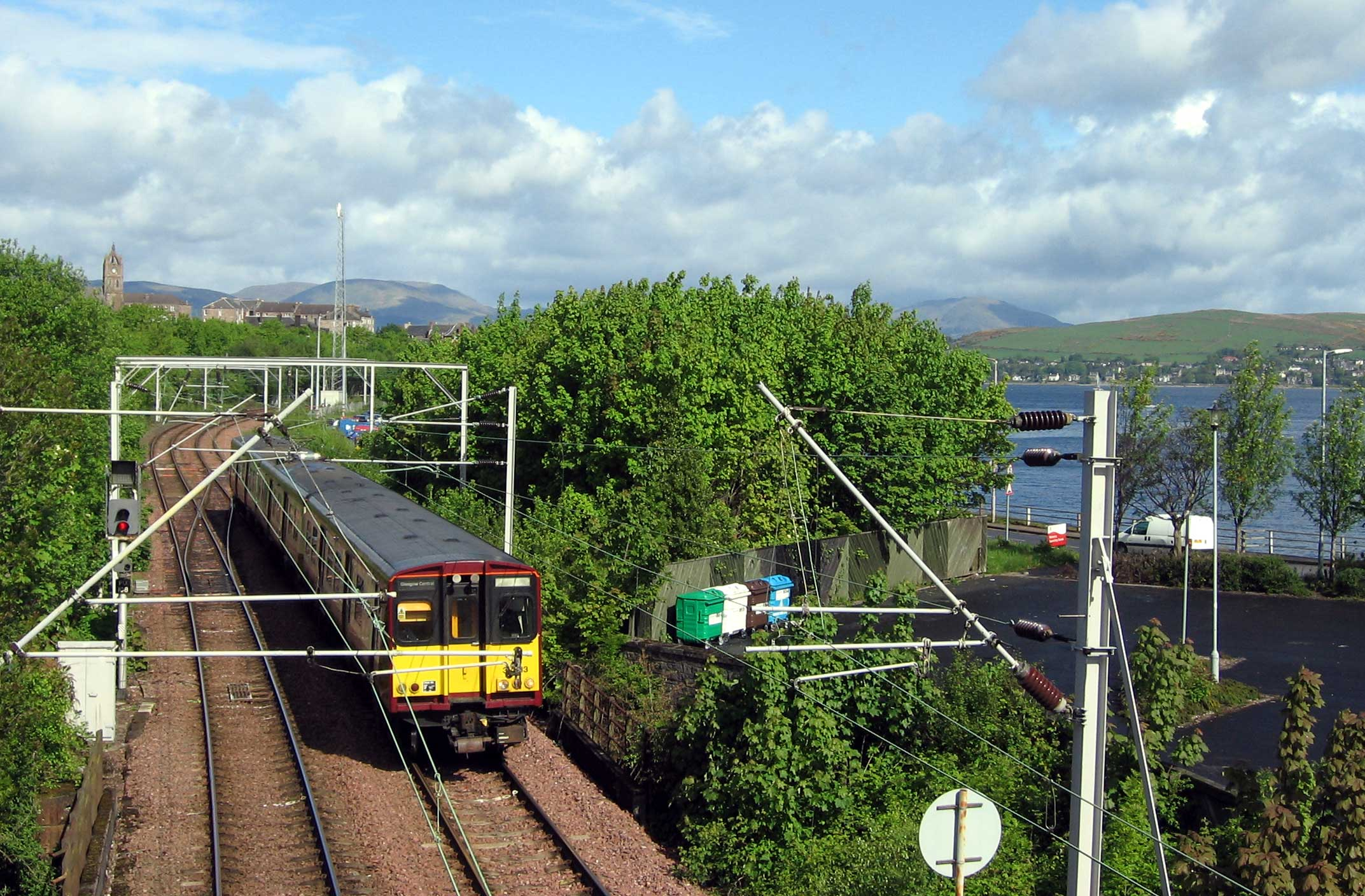
- A Class 314 train leaves Gourock pierhead to run along the south bank of the Firth of Clyde towards Glasgow

Overview
- Owner: Network Rail
- Locale: Inverclyde; Scotland
- Stations: 22

Service
- System: National Rail
- Operator(s): ScotRail
- Rolling stock: Class 380; Class 318; Class 320; Class 385

Technical
- Track gauge: 4 ft 8 1/2 in (1,435 mm)
- Electrification: 25 kV 50 Hz AC
Route map
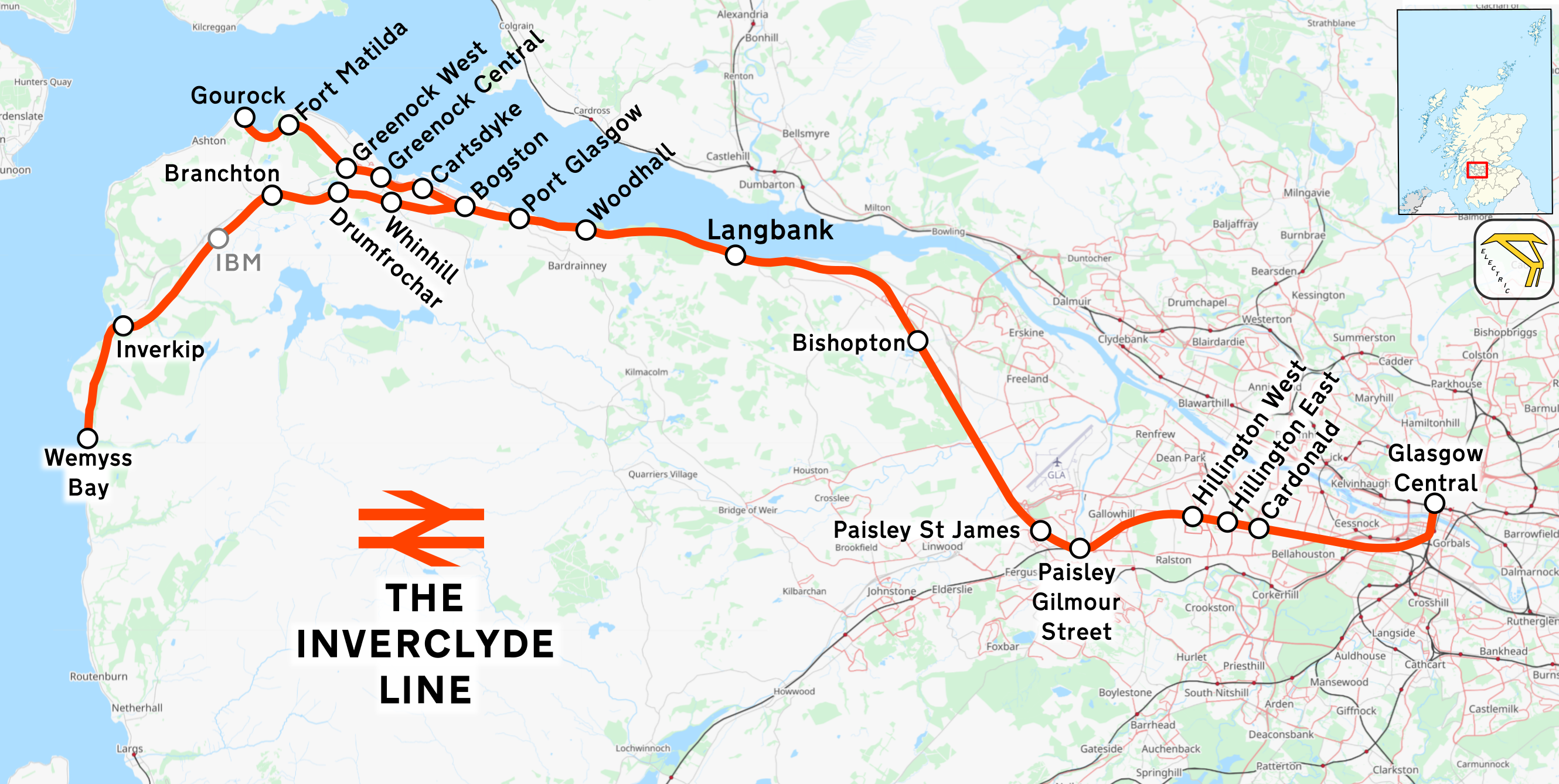
(Click to expand)

The Inverclyde Line is a railway line running from Glasgow Central station through Paisley (Gilmour Street) and a series of stations to the south of the River Clyde and the Firth of Clyde, terminating at Gourock and Wemyss Bay, where it connects to Caledonian MacBrayne ferry services. The line has been in operation since the 1840s between Glasgow and Greenock and was the first passenger service to follow the River Clyde to the coast. The line was electrified in 1967.

== History ==
The line was opened by the Glasgow, Paisley and Greenock Railway on 31 March 1841, and initially ran from Bridge Street railway station in Glasgow to a terminus at Cathcart Street, Greenock (later renamed Greenock Central railway station), with the section between Glasgow, and Paisley Gilmour Street being run by the Glasgow and Paisley Joint Railway. For the first time a railway took passengers right down the River Clyde, taking about one hour whereas Clyde steamers took around twice as long. The terminus was a short walk from Custom House Quay, Greenock, and the railway was very popular with passengers who boarded steamers there to visit holiday resorts down the Firth of Clyde or to commute in summer to their villas around the shores of the firth.

On 9 July 1847 the railway merged with the Caledonian Railway and became their main outlet to the coast. The Greenock and Wemyss Bay Railway opened its branch line on 13 May 1865 with its trains being operated by the Caledonian Railway, but its steamer operations were slow to live up to their promise and when in 1869 the Glasgow and South Western Railway opened its station at Princes Pier, Greenock, the Cathcart Street station was effectively bypassed and the Caley lost trade. They had been trying for some time to organise an extension to Gourock, and having gained Parliamentary approval in 1884 they spent three years in construction which involved extensive tunnelling, and opened Gourock railway station on 1 June 1889. In August 1893 the Greenock and Wemyss Bay Railway amalgamated with the Caledonian Railway.

In the 1923 grouping, the line became part of the London, Midland and Scottish Railway (LMS). The line was electrified in 1967, seven years after the North Clyde Line. The electric Class 311 trains were specially built for the line in 1967, although Class 303 trains were also used.

== Current operation ==
As of 2025, the line is mainly operated by Class 318s, Class 320s, Class 380s and Class 385s, The Inverclyde line uses the same Glasgow and Paisley Joint Railway tracks as the Ayrshire Coast Line until Paisley Gilmour Street; although the two lines occupy different sets of platforms at Paisley Gilmour Street. From Paisley, the line heads to Port Glasgow station, after which it branches. The main route heads through Greenock to Gourock, where it connects with ferry services to Dunoon and Kilcreggan. The branch heads through the southern suburbs of Greenock to Wemyss Bay, where it connects with ferry services to Rothesay on the island of Bute (From 1 October 2015, for a period of 24 weeks, the ferry to Rothesay left from Gourock. This was due to essential improvement work being carried out at Wemyss Bay linkspan)

As of June 2024, for most of the day four trains an hour operate each way on the Glasgow to Port Glasgow stretch, two of which run to Gourock and the other two running to Wemyss Bay. The Gourock trains are express services stopping only at Paisley Gilmour Street and Bishopton between Glasgow and Port Glasgow, while the Wemyss Bay trains stop at all stations. This changes after 7 pm and on Sunday: the Wemyss Bay line is reduced to one train an hour, which runs express between Glasgow and Port Glasgow, and the Gourock trains stop all stations.

== Proposed link to Glasgow Airport ==
The Glasgow Airport Rail Link to Glasgow Airport would have branched off from the Inverclyde Line near Paisley St. James station. In December 2006, the Scottish Executive gave the final go-ahead for the new link to be constructed; however, the project was subsequently cancelled in September 2009.
