= Wellington Academy =

Defunct secondary school in Scotland

Coordinates: 55°56′38″N 4°45′46″W

Information
- Established: August 1990
- Closed: June 2007
- Head teacher: Mr Billy Paul
- Enrollment: c.450 (2007)

Wellington Academy was a secondary school at Dempster Street in Greenock, Scotland serving the Eastern and Central areas of the town. In 2007 it merged with Greenock High School to form Inverclyde Academy.

The 'Welly' was opened in August 1990, as a merger between Grovepark and Cowdeknowes High Schools. The school closed at the end of the 2007 summer term, with a roll of only around 450 pupils.

The last head boy and head girl were Jonathan Glass and Mhairi Lyle.

The last head teacher was Mr Billy Paul.

The site the school once stood on has now been cleared, although the fencing and walls surrounding the school (from the days when the Mount School stood on the site) are retained. The site is proposed to be used for the location of the new Greenock Health Centre building.

== Feeder primary schools in 2007 ==
- Overton Primary - serving the Overton, Pennyfern and "the estates" areas of Greenock.
- Highlander's Academy Primary - serving the Town centre and the Bow Farm areas of Greenock.

== Schools formerly associated with Wellington ==
- Hillend Primary School (1990 until 1992)
- Oakfield Primary ( from 1993 until 2004) - serving the Weir Street, Maukinhill and Gibshill areas of Greenock.
- King's Glen Primary (until 2004) - serving the Leven Road, Clynder Road and Strone areas of Greenock.
- King's Oak Primary (2004–2005) - amalgamated Oakfield and King's Glen primaries, areas as above. Was associated with Port Glasgow High School/Greenock Academy until 2007, then Inverclyde Academy from 2007.

== Closure ==
In June 2007, Wellington amalgamated with Greenock High School. Both schools merged into a new school built on the site of the Ravenscraig Football Pitches - close to the Greenock High site in the Spango Valley area of Greenock.

The new high school now has a catchment area serving the majority of the district.

== Facilities ==
Wellington also had a Pre-School located in its campus as well as facilities for the disabled. It had a fitness suite as well as sports facilities. It also had a reputation for Learning Support and catering for additional needs and there were teacher training classrooms and Sport Scotland facilities located on site.

The school played host to a community wing on the first floor which was also a common room for sixth year pupils - a facility which was well used by pupils and also various youth clubs who use it.
