= Inverclyde Royal Hospital =

- NHS Greater Glasgow and Clyde
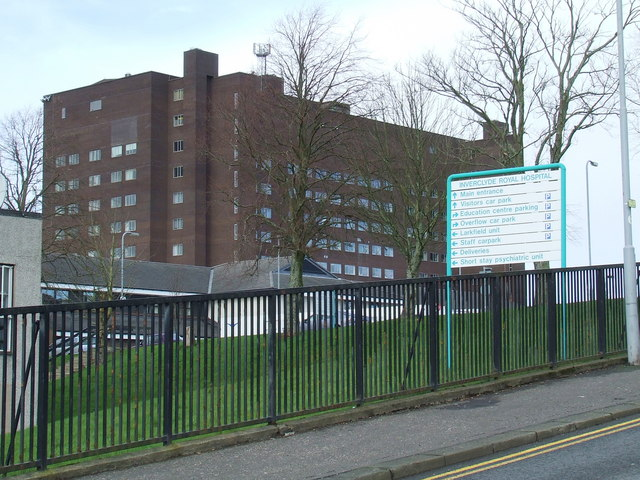
- Inverclyde Royal Hospital

- Shown in Inverclyde

Geography
- Location: Greenock, Inverclyde, Scotland, United Kingdom
- Coordinates: 55.944132°N 4.8099571°W

Organisation
- Care system: NHS Scotland
- Type: General
- Affiliated university: University of Glasgow; University of the West of Scotland

Services
- Emergency department: Yes
- Beds: 360

Links
- Website: Inverclyde Royal Hospital

Inverclyde Royal Hospital is a district general hospital in Greenock which serves a population area of 125,000 consisting of Inverclyde (including Greenock), Largs, Isle of Bute and Cowal Peninsula. Inverclyde Royal Hospital is one of three main hospitals in the South Clyde area, alongside Vale of Leven Hospital in Alexandria and Royal Alexandra Hospital in Paisley and is managed by NHS Greater Glasgow and Clyde.

== History ==
The hospital was commissioned to replace the Greenock Royal Infirmary, the Eye Infirmary, Gateside Hospital, Duncan Macpherson Hospital and Broadstone Jubilee Hospital. Construction work started at the end of August 1970 and the hospital was completed in 1979.

In 2004, Inverclyde Royal Hospital faced proposals for a major downsizing with the loss of the accident and emergency department and the acute surgical ward in an effort to save costs. Many people criticised the plans complaining that the Inverclyde Royal Hospital was being seen as nothing more than a large health centre. In February 2007, after undertaking a review, NHS Greater Glasgow and Clyde proposed retaining the accident and emergency department and core inpatient services, including the trauma and emergency medical departments at Inverclyde Royal Hospital and submitted this proposal to the Scottish Government for approval. The then Scottish Health Minister, Andy Kerr, approved the proposal which was supported by people in the local area. However, as outlined in the document entitled "A Safe and Sustainable Future for Hospital Services in Inverclyde and Renfrewshire", certain services including dermatology, the ENT (Ear, Nose and Throat) Unit, urology and vascular surgery were relocated to the Southern General Hospital in summer 2007.

== Hospital Radio ==
Inverclyde Hospital Radio Voluntary Service has been catering for both the patients and staff of Inverclyde Royal Hospital since the early 1990s, when Paisley Hospital Broadcasting Services ceased to exist. They are acknowledged as both a Scottish registered charity and by OSCR (Office of the Scottish Charity Regulator). The hospital radio broadcasts as much as 44 hours of live programming, a sustaining service where necessary and also commentary for the local senior team, Greenock Morton, who are also a major sponsor.

== Teaching ==
The hospital serves as a teaching hospital for medical students from the University of Glasgow.
