= Inverclyde Academy =

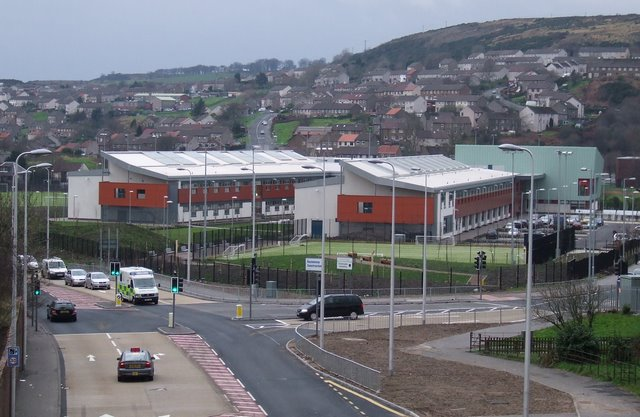
- School badge Inverclyde Academy (2008)

Location
- Cumberland Road; Greenock, Inverclyde, PA16 0FB; Scotland; 55°56′23″N 04°48′38″W

Information
- Type: 11–18 state comprehensive, non–selective secondary school
- Motto: Work Hard. Aim High. Achieve Your Potential.
- Established: 2007
- Local authority: Inverclyde Council
- Head Teacher: Denise Crawford
- Staff: 70
- Gender: Mixed
- Age: 11 to 18
- Enrolment: 780
- Houses: Arran, Cumbrae, Eriskay
- Colour: Inverclyde Tartan
- Website: School blog

Inverclyde Academy (Scottish Gaelic: Acadamaidh Inbhir Chluaidh) is a secondary school in Greenock, Scotland that provides education to the majority of the Inverclyde area. The catchment area for the Academy stretches from the Inverclyde border at Wemyss Bay to Greenock's East End and Strone Farm areas.

The school was created by the amalgamation of Greenock High School and Wellington Academy and cost £29 million to open.

== History ==
The school was built on the site of three red blaes (gravel) football pitches. Nicol Stephen, Deputy First Minister of Scotland, cut the first sod at the site on 26 February 2007.

Initially, following the merger, the school was split between the old sites of Greenock High School, two minutes from the current site, and Wellington Academy, on the other side of the town. In September 2007 the students went on strike in protest about the teaching time lost commuting between the two sites. As a result, Inverclyde Council decided that, from January 2008, all pupils would be housed in the Greenock High School campus on Inverkip Road until the new building could be occupied.

The new building was opened on 19 December 2008 by Princess Anne.

== Feeder primary schools ==
- Aileymill Primary School (Greenock)
- Inverkip Primary School (Inverkip)
- Kings Oak Primary (Greenock)
- Lady Alice Primary School (Greenock)
- Wemyss Bay Primary School (Wemyss Bay)
- Whinhill Primary School (Greenock)

== Inspection Reports ==
- HMIE inspection, Greenock High
- HMIE inspection, Wellington Academy
