= M. R. D. Meek =

Scottish author

Margaret Reid Duncan Meek (née Gilloran; March 19, 1918 – November 27, 2009) was a Scottish author of mysteries. Some of her novels were written under the pseudonym Alison Cairns.

== Biography ==
=== Early life and education ===
Margaret Reid Duncan Gilloran was born March 19, 1918, in Greenock, Renfrewshire, Scotland. She attended Skerry's College from 1937 to 1938; College of Law, Lancaster Gate from 1962 to 1967; and London University, receiving an LL.B. (with honors) in 1968.

=== Career ===
She worked as a shorthand typist and as a clerical assistant before she became a solicitor. Meek's career as an attorney began following the death of her first husband. She began her writing career following her retirement from the law in 1978.

She was perhaps best known for her 15-book Lennox Kemp series. The first, With Flowers That Fell, was published in 1982. The final book, Kemp's Last Case, was published in 2005.

=== Personal life ===
Meek was a Presbyterian and was politically liberal. She was the chair of a local branch of a cancer research group and she volunteered with Meals on Wheels.

Her first marriage was to Donald Gregory, a doctor, on July 11, 1942. They had two children: Christopher and Cressida. Donald Gregory died in 1959. She then married Colin Alfred Meek, a government scientist, on April 21, 1978. Colin Meek died in 1993.

M. R. D. Meek died on November 27, 2009.

== Selected works ==
=== Lennox Kemp series; under the name M. R. D. Meek ===
1. With Flowers That Fell, R. Hale (London, England), 1982.
2. The Sitting Ducks, Collins (London, England), 1983.
3. Hang the Consequences, Collins (London, England), 1984, Scribner (New York, NY), 1985.
4. The Split Second, Collins (London, England), 1985, Scribner (New York, NY), 1987.
5. In Remembrance of Rose, Collins (London, England), 1986, Scribner (New York, NY), 1988.
6. A Worm of Doubt, Collins (London, England), 1987, Scribner (New York, NY), 1988.
7. A Mouthful of Sand, Collins (London, England), 1988, Scribner (New York, NY), 1989.
8. The Loose Connection, Scribner (New York, NY), 1989.
9. This Blessed Plot, Scribner (New York, NY), 1990.
10. Touch and Go, Scribner (New York, NY), 1992.
11. Postscript to Murder, Collins (London, England), 1996.
12. A House to Die For, Severn House (Sutton, Surrey, England), 2000.
13. If You Go Down to the Woods, Severn House (Sutton, Surrey, England), 2001.
14. The Vanishing Point, Severn House (Sutton, Surrey, England), 2003.
15. Kemp's Last Case, Severn House (Sutton, Surrey, England), 2005.

=== Under the pseudonym Alison Cairns ===
- Strained Relations. St. Martin's, 1983.
- New Year Resolution. St. Martins, 1985.
