= Charles McQueen =

New Zealand engineer and gold-dredger (1836–1906)

- Born: 17 April 1836; Greenock, Renfrewshire, Scotland
- Died: 30 May 1906 (aged 70); Creswick, Victoria, Australia

Charles McQueen (17 April 1836 – 30 May 1906) was a New Zealand engineer and gold-dredger. He was born in Greenock, Renfrewshire, Scotland on 17 April 1836.
