= Greenock Royal Infirmary =

- NHS Greater Glasgow and Clyde
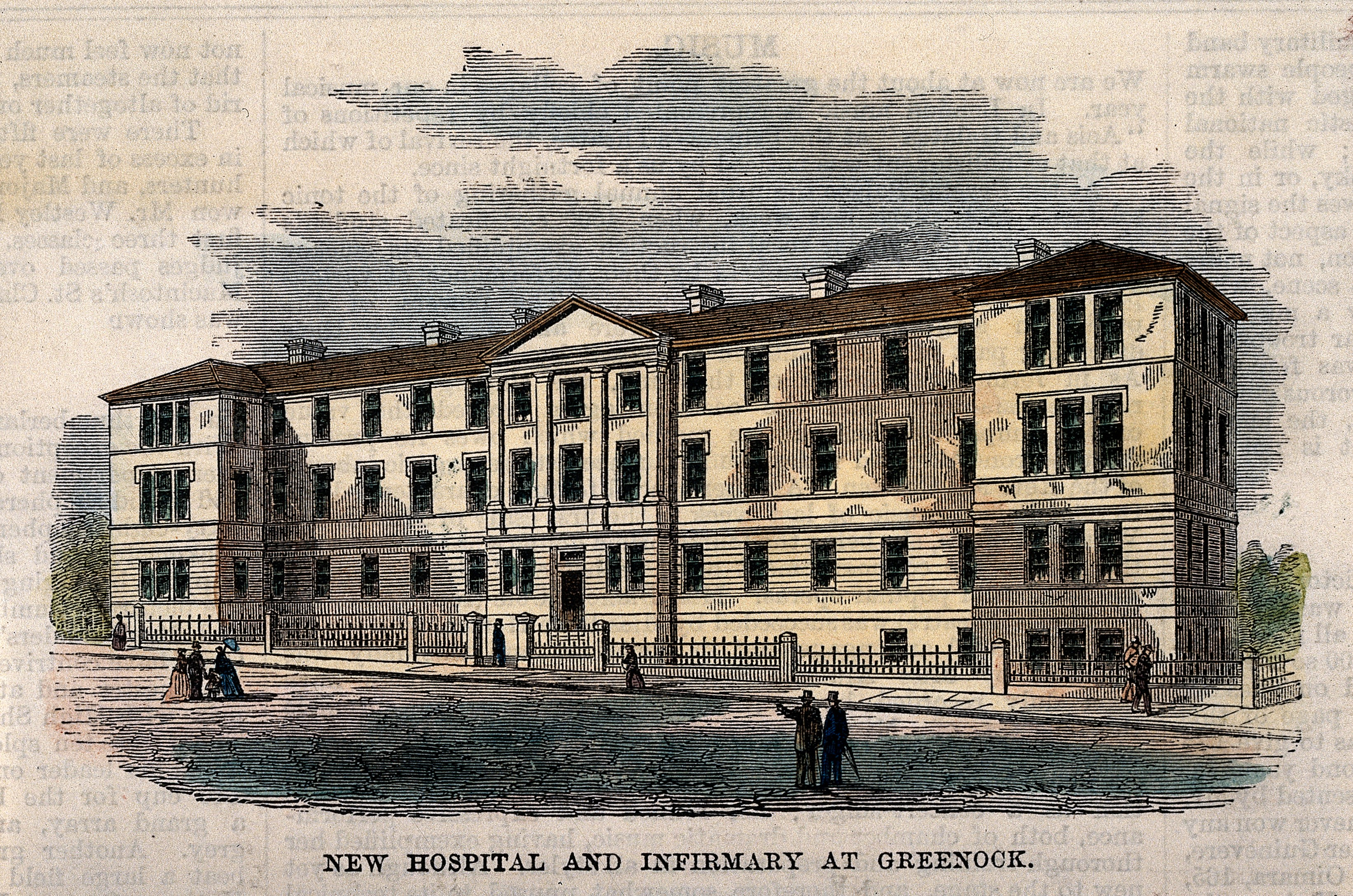
- Hospital and Infirmary at 2 Duncan Street, 1869

- Shown in Inverclyde

Geography
- Location: Inverkip Street, Greenock, Scotland
- Coordinates: 55.9473°N 4.7649°W

Organisation
- Care system: NHS Scotland
- Type: General

Services
- Emergency department: No

History
- Founded: 1879
- Closed: 2014

Links
- Lists: Hospitals in Scotland

Greenock Royal Infirmary was a health facility in Greenock, Scotland. Its original Hospital or Infirmary of 1809 stood in Inverkip Street, it was subsequently extended round into East Shaw Street, then in 1869 a new building on the adjacent site at 2 Duncan Street formed the main address of the Hospital and Infirmary. It was renamed the Greenock Royal Infirmary in 1922.

== History ==
The facility had its origins in a dispensary for the sick poor which was established in 1801 in the town centre near the harbour, initially in Manse Lane, then nearby in Cathcart Street. This provided medicines, and a surgeon made daily visits to the poor when they were sick at home. In 1806 a contagious fever spread from the crew of a Russian prize ship in the harbour, causing many deaths, and one of the surgeons proposed a new hospital or fever-house, "where the poor would be removed from their own uncomfortable dwellings, not only for their own sakes, but for the purpose of checking infection."

In 1807, funds were raised to build a Hospital or Infirmary, and a site obtained on the south edge of the town, up on the east side of Inverkip Street between the Anti-Burgher Secession Church of 1803 (called the Canister Kirk for its shape) and the 1789 cemetery. The building on Inverkip Street was designed by the local harbour engineer, John Aird, the foundation stone was laid in 1808, and the first patient was admitted in June 1809. The building was erected at an expense of £1815, on a site of land given by Sir John Shaw Stewart.

The infirmary was extended with wings added in 1830 after another fever epidemic, and an 1847 extension incorporating the site and parts of the Canister Kirk continued the hospital round into East Shaw Street. A new Hospital and Infirmary building designed by Salmon and Son was added on the adjacent site at 2 Duncan Street in 1869. It was renamed the Greenock Royal Infirmary in 1922 and joined the National Health Service in 1948.

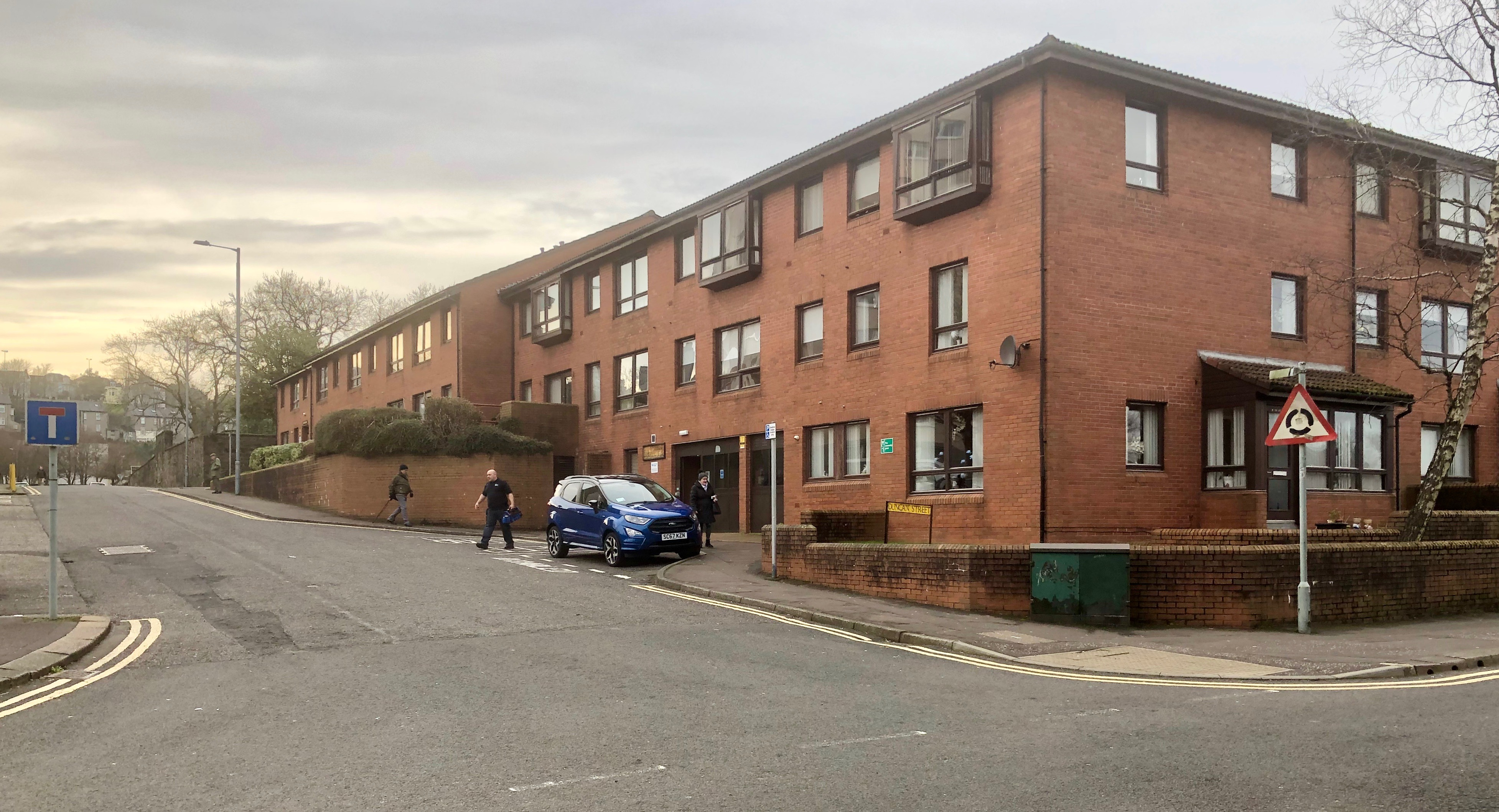
John Galt House sheltered housing at 2 Duncan Street, Greenock, seen from East Shaw Street

After services transferred to the Inverclyde Royal Hospital, the Greenock Royal Infirmary closed in 1979 and was subsequently demolished. The site was then used for a Sheltered housing complex providing 34 flats (for seniors) with associated facilities, built in 1988, which is named John Galt House in commemoration of the novelist and entrepreneur John Galt who was buried in the adjacent Inverkip Street Cemetery in 1839.

== Notable nursing staff ==
The first nurses that trained on the Nightingale system started working in Greenock Royal Infirmary in 1868. This included Miss Beatty who was appointed as Lady Superintendent of Nursing.

The Edinburgh Nurses Training Society sent female nurses of ‘high moral character’ to be probationary nurses and receive a one year training at Greenock Royal Infirmary. In 1870, Miss Beatty left and was replaced by Miss Johnstone who had worked at Glasgow Royal Infirmary. By 1871 there were 21 nurses. Several nurses at this time were ill with fever and smallpox, of which two died.

Miss Johnstone died in 1884 after 15 years’ service and was replaced by Miss Fletcher as Lady Superintendent. Miss Tod took over from Miss Fletcher in 1887 and worked as the matron for 27 years, retiring in 1914. Miss AM Filley took over this role and also worked as the Matron for 27 years. Miss G Manners was Matron from 1942-1947, leaving to take on the role of Matron at Glasgow Royal Infirmary. She was succeeded by Miss MB Crichton who retired after 17 years service in 1963.

With the introduction of the State Registration of Nurses in 1920 the infirmary’s training school adopted the three year training programme. In 1964 a two year course for State Enrolled Nurses was established.

Miss E Beaton received the RRC for her work in the Third Scottish General Hospital in 1916.
