= Greenock =

Town in Inverclyde, Scotland

Coordinates: 55.950°N 4.765°W

Greenock: Scottish Gaelic: Grianaig; Scots: Greenock
- Town and administrative centre
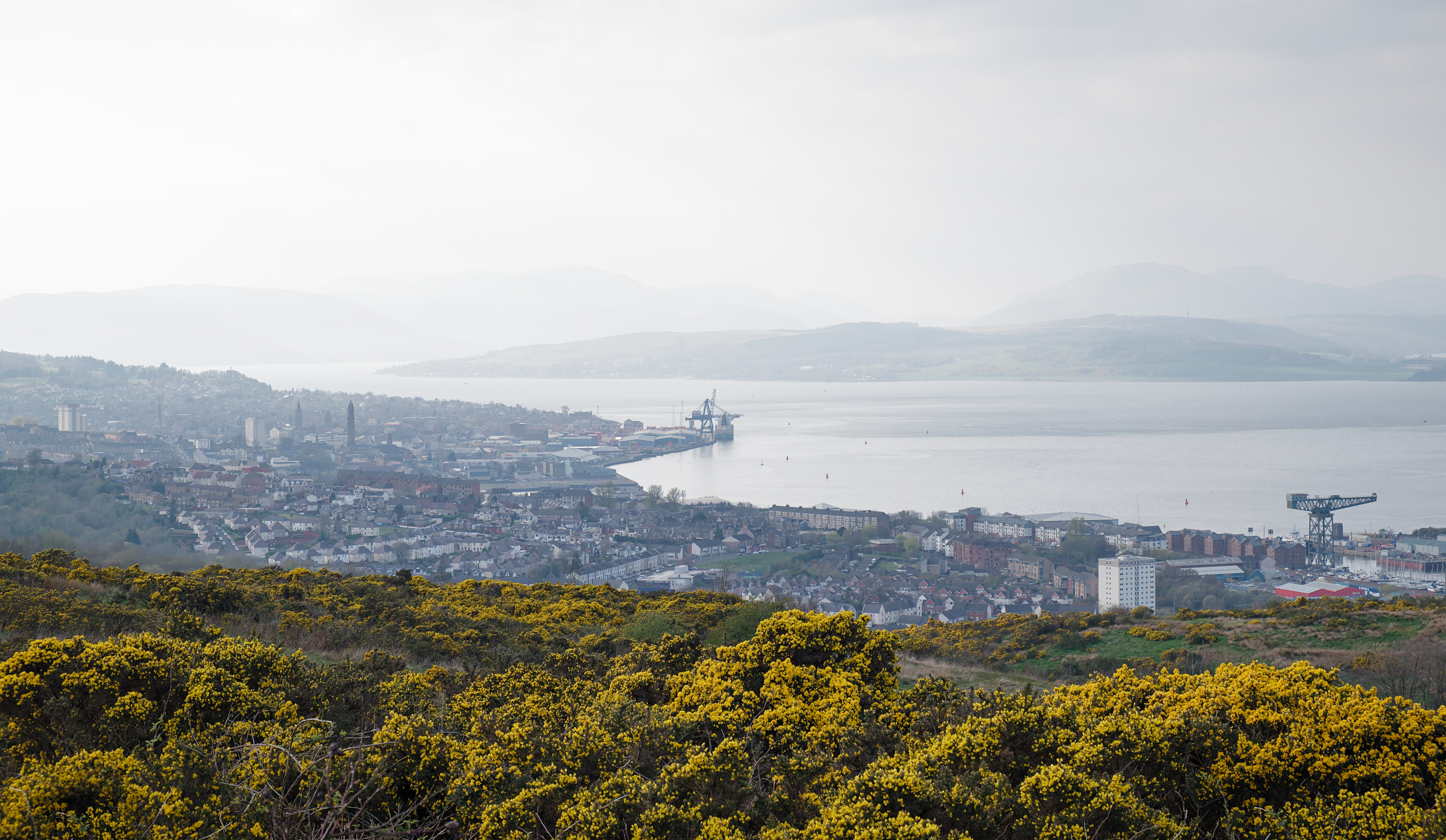
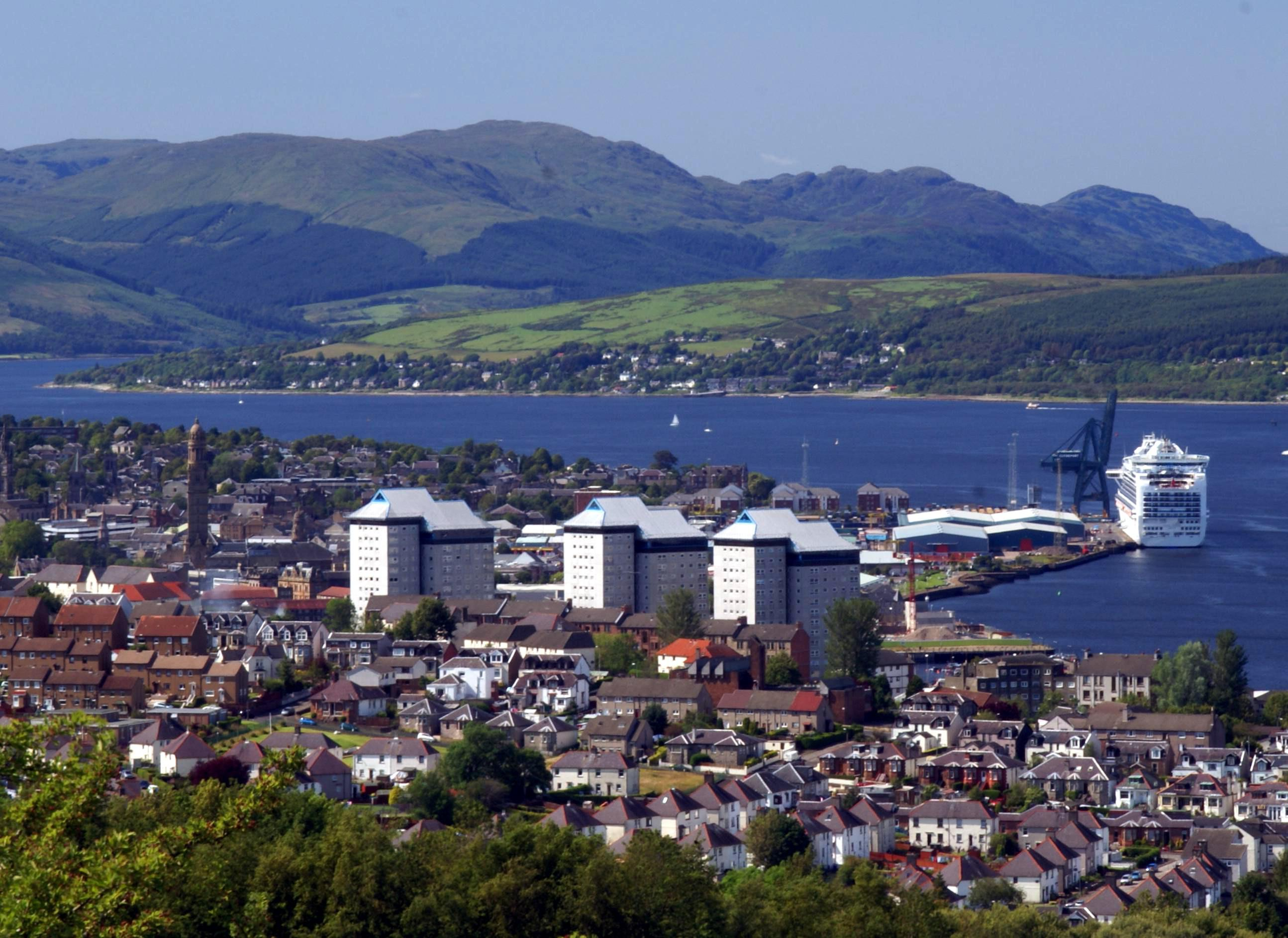
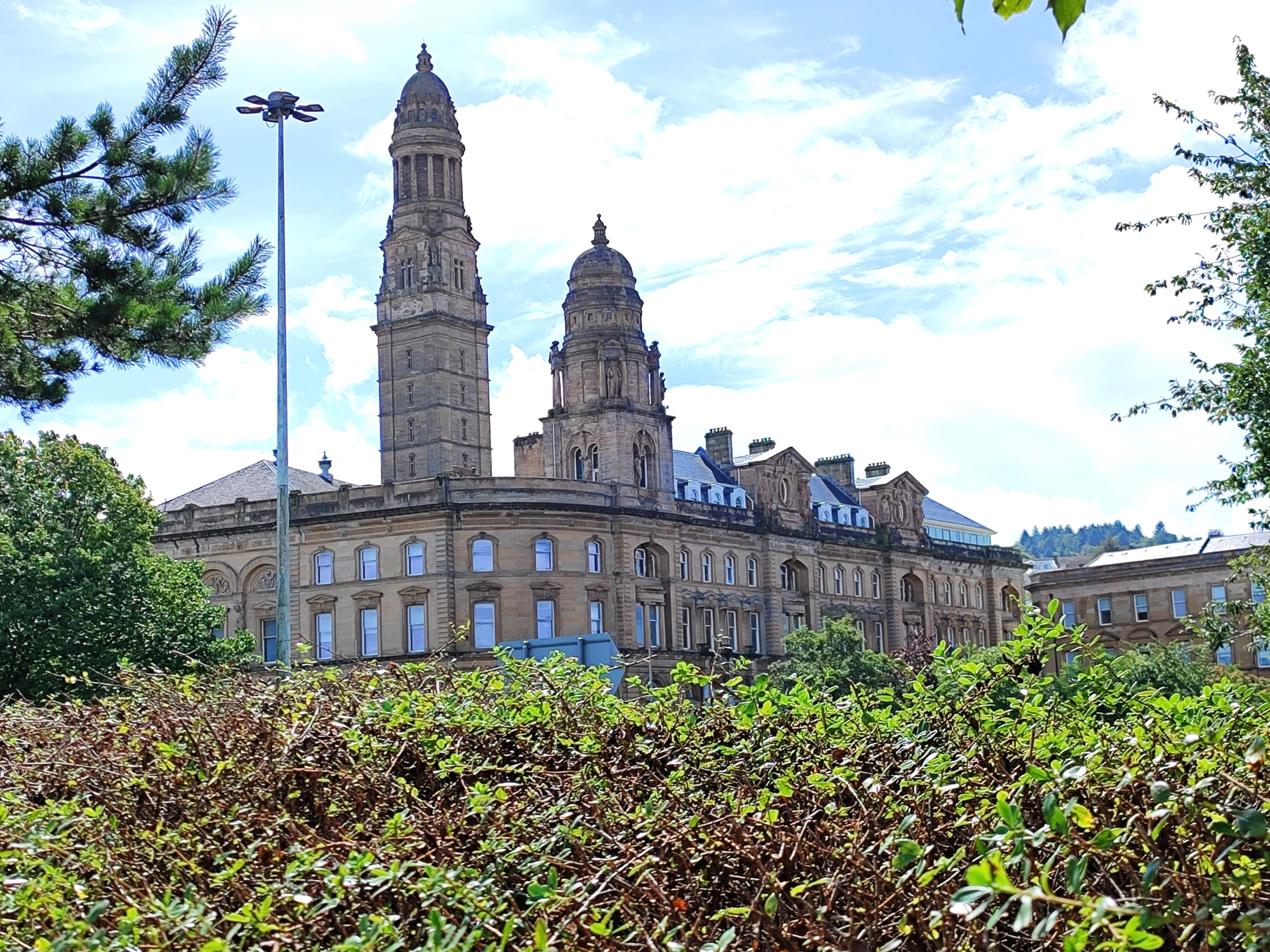
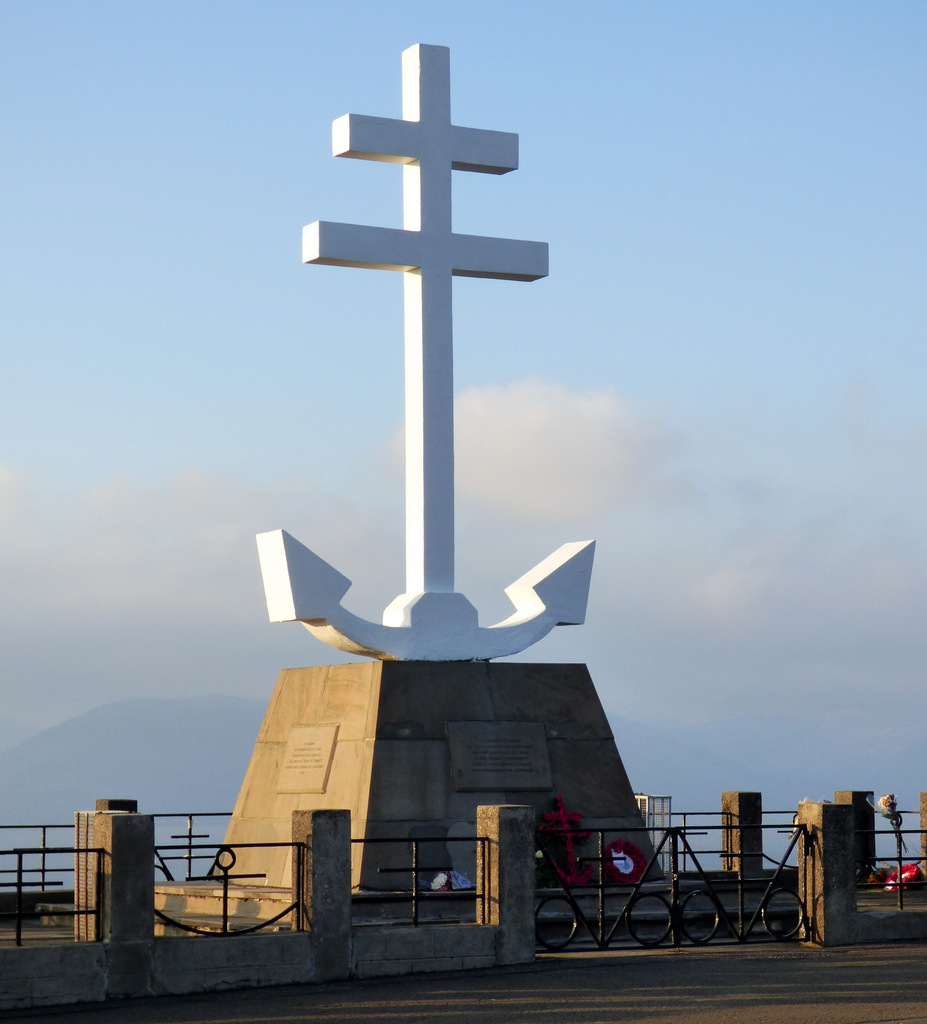
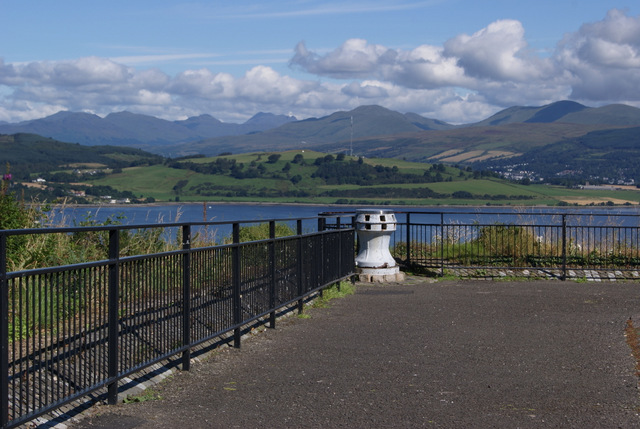
- From top; left–right: View of Greenock from Auchmountain Road; view over Greenock and Cruise Terminal (right); Greenock Municipal Buildings; the Free France monument atop Lyle Hill; view from Lyle Hill

- Location within Inverclyde
- Area: 12.7 km^{2} (4.9 sq mi)
- Population: 42,870 (2022)
  - Density: 3,376/km^{2} (8,740/sq mi)
- Demonym: Greenockian
- OS grid reference: NS275764
  - London: 360 mi (580 km)
- Council area: Inverclyde
- Lieutenancy area: Renfrewshire
- Country: Scotland
- Sovereign state: United Kingdom
- Post town: GREENOCK
- Postcode district: PA15, PA16
- Dialling code: 01475
- Police: Scotland
- Fire: Scottish
- Ambulance: Scottish
- UK Parliament: Inverclyde and Renfrewshire West
- Scottish Parliament: Inverclyde

Greenock (/ˈɡriːnək/; Scots: Greenock; Scottish Gaelic: Grianaig, pronounced [ˈkɾʲiənɛkʲ]) is a town in Inverclyde, Scotland, located in the west central Lowlands of Scotland. The town is the administrative centre of Inverclyde Council. It is a former burgh within the historic county of Renfrewshire, and forms part of a contiguous urban area with Gourock to the west and Port Glasgow to the east.

The 2022 census showed that Greenock had a population of 42,870, a decrease from the 44,248 recorded in 2011. It lies on the south bank of the Clyde at the "Tail of the Bank" where the River Clyde deepens into the Firth of Clyde.

== History ==
=== Name ===
Place-name scholar William J. Watson wrote that "Greenock is well known in Gaelic as Grianáig, dative of grianág, 'a sunny knoll'". The Scottish Gaelic place-name Grianaig is relatively common, with another Greenock near Callander in Menteith (formerly in Perthshire) and yet another at Muirkirk in Kyle, now in East Ayrshire. R. M. Smith in (1921) described the alternative derivation from Common Brittonic *Graenag, 'gravelly or sandy place', as more appropriate, accurately describing the original foreshore. Johnston (1934) notes that "some Gaels call the seaport Ghónait, and that a possible derivation may be greannach, meaning 'rough, gravelly'.

The name of the town has had various spellings over time. It was printed in early Acts of Parliament as Grinok, Greenhok, Grinock, Greenhoke, Greinnock, and later as Greinok. Old Presbyterial records used Grenok, a common spelling until it was changed to Greenock around 1700. Grenock was also used in the 19th century, e.g. in Lloyd's List publications.

The spelling Greenoak was found in two factory accounts dating back to 1717, and a legend developed of a green oak tree at the edge of the Clyde at William Street being used by fishermen to tie up their boats. No reliable source has been found referencing green oaks, however, and so this has been generally dismissed as imaginative Anglophone folk etymology. Nonetheless the image has frequently been used as an emblem or logo, carved on public buildings, used on banners and badges, and was once emblazoned on the local Co-operative Society emblem. It reappeared in 1992 as the new shopping centre's name, the Oak Mall, which uses a green tree as its logo. The name is also recalled in a local song ("The Green Oak Tree"). Significantly, no green oak appears on the former burgh coat of arms, which features the three chalices of the Shaw Stewarts, a sailing ship in full sail, and two herring above the motto "God Speed Greenock".

=== Early history ===
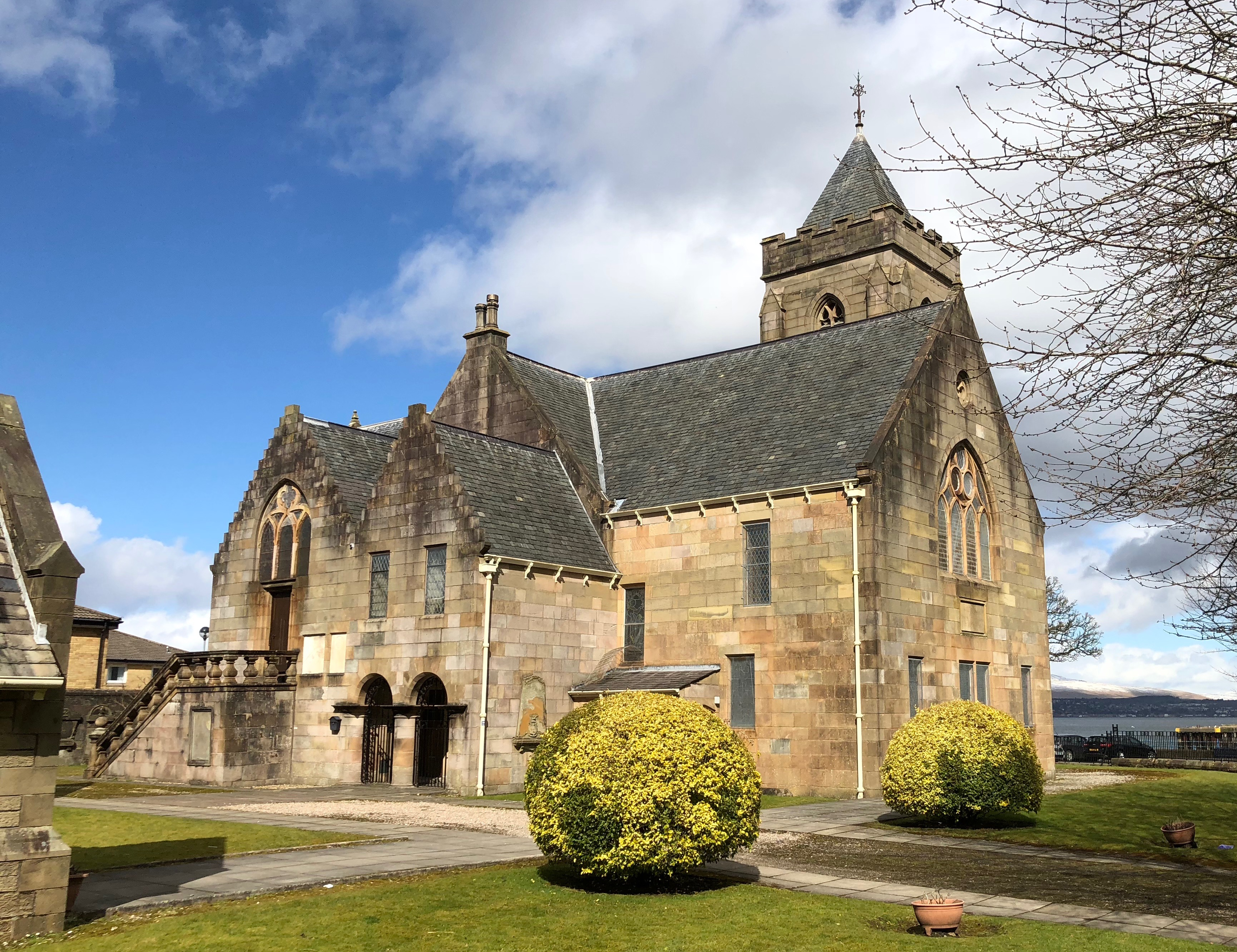
The Old West Kirk of 1591, much altered over the years, was moved in 1928 to a new location, again close to the Firth of Clyde.

Hugh de Grenock was created a Scottish Baron in 1296, in the aftermath of the English invasion of Scotland. The feudal barony of Greenock was held by the Galbraith family, and Easter Greenock Castle became their family seat. Around 1400 Malcolm Galbraith died with no sons, and his estate was divided between his two daughters to become two baronies: the eldest inherited Easter Greenock and married a Crawfurd, while Wester Greenock went to the younger daughter who married Schaw of Sauchie. Around 1540 the adjoining barony of Finnart was passed to the Schaw family, extending their holdings westward to the boundary of Gourock, and in 1542 Sir John Schaw founded Wester Greenock castle.

The Scottish Reformation of 1560 closed the chapels in the parish, and as the parish church was some 6 miles (10 kilometres) distant at Inverkip over a difficult route which was impassable in winter, in 1589 John Schaw obtained a charter from King James VI to build a kirk for the "poor people upon his lands who were all fishers and of a reasonable number". Later known as the Old Kirk or the Old West Kirk, it was constructed on the west bank of the West Burn estuary and is reputed to have been the first Protestant church built in Scotland after the Reformation.

The Schaw, later Shaw and Shaw Stewart, family retained a leading role in Greenock over the following centuries. In 1670, Sir John Shaw obtained a charter from King Charles II, combining the lands of Finnart and the barony of Wester Greenock, to create the barony of Greenock.

=== Fishing villages, harbours and shipbuilding ===
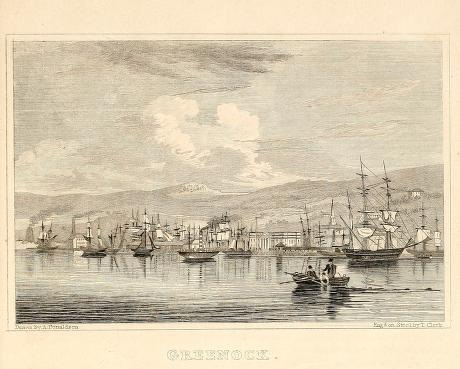
Waterfront, roads outside the harbour, c. 1838

The coast of Greenock formed a broad bay with three smaller indentations: the Bay of Quick was known as a safe anchorage as far back as 1164. To its east, a sandy bay ran eastwards from the Old Kirk and the West Burn as far as Wester Greenock castle. The fishing village of Greenock developed along this bay, and around 1635 Sir John Schaw had a jetty built into the bay which became known as Sir John's Bay. In that year he obtained a charter raising Greenock to a Burgh of Barony with rights to a weekly market. Further east, Saint Laurence Bay curved round past the Crawfurd Barony of Easter Greenock to Garvel (or Gravel) Point. When a pier (or dyke) was built making the bay an important harbour, the fishing village of Cartsdyke gained the alternative name of Craufurdsdyke. In 1642 it was made into the Burgh of Barony of Crawfurdsdyke, and part of the ill-fated Darien Scheme set out from this pier in 1697. Its town was named Cartsburn.

The fishing trade grew prosperous, with barrels of salted herring exported widely, and shipping trade developed. As seagoing ships could not go further up the River Clyde, the Glasgow merchants including the Tobacco Lords wanted harbour access but were in disputes with Greenock over harbour dues and warehouses. They tried to buy the Garvel estate for a harbour when Easter Greenock lands were put up for sale to meet debts, but were outbid by Sir John Schaw who then got a Crown Charter of 1670 uniting Easter and Wester Greenock into the Burgh Barony of Greenock. A separate Barony of Cartsburn was created, the first baron being Thomas Craufurd. In 1668 the City of Glasgow got the lease of 13 acres (5 hectares) of land upriver close to Newark Castle, and construction promptly started on Newport Glasgow harbour which by 1710 had the principal Clyde custom house.

In 1696 and 1700 Schaw and residents of the town made unsuccessful bids to the Scottish Parliament for grants for a Greenock harbour, then when the Act of Union 1707 opened up involvement in colonial trade, they raised their own funds. The work was completed in 1710, with quays extended out into Sir John's Bay to enclose the harbour. In 1711 the shipbuilding industry was founded when Scotts leased ground between the harbour and the West Burn to build fishing boats. Greenock rapidly became a major port and shipbuilding centre, and though tobacco imported from the colonies was taken to Glasgow by pack horse, the more bulky imports of sugar were processed locally. From 1774 the dredging of the River Clyde increasingly allowed ships to take merchandise directly to Glasgow, but merchants continued to use Greenock harbour.

The American Revolutionary War temporarily interrupted trade, and the gun battery of Fort Beauclerc near the West Burn was extended to guard against the threat of privateers, but the emphasis shifted to wider markets including imports of rum and sugar from the Caribbean, wines from Spain, and fish from North America. A whaling business operated for about 40 years. Greenock "was mainly a trading port for goods such as sugar and cotton, but also dispatched ships to West Africa to take people to be enslaved" in Britain's American colonies. In 1868, in what became a cause celebre, seven young Greenock males stowed away on a cargo ship bound for Quebec. Treated with what was, even for the times, exceptional brutality, they were forcibly disembarked in Newfoundland; by the time they were returned to Scotland, three of them had died. The captain and mate of the cargo ship were tried in a blaze of publicity at the High Court of Justiciary in Edinburgh and served short prison terms.

=== Custom House and steamboats ===
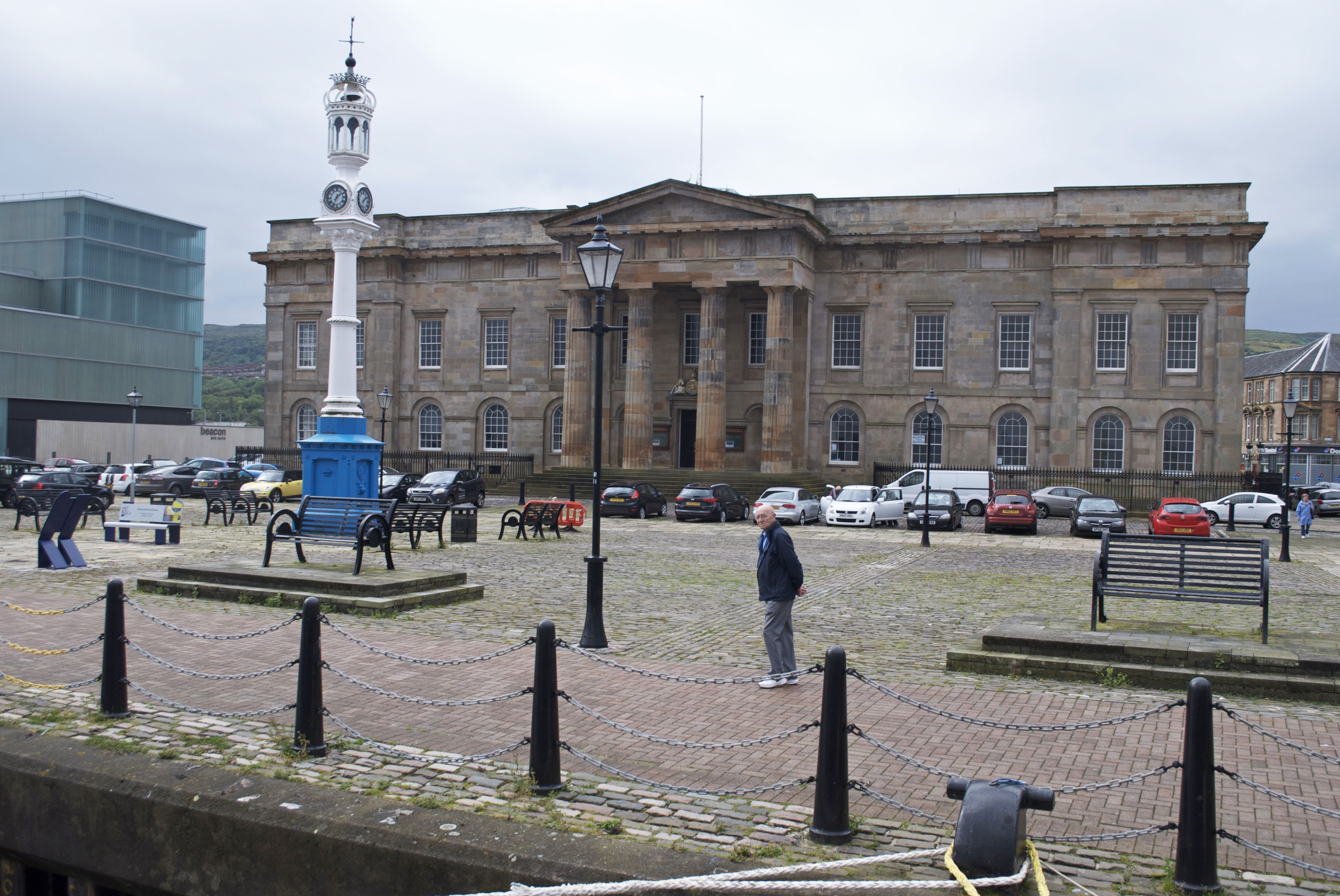
The Custom House, viewed from Custom House Quay.

In 1714 Greenock became a custom house port as a branch of Port Glasgow, and for a period this operated from rooms leased in Greenock. Receipts rose rapidly with the expansion of colonial trade, and in 1778 the custom house moved to newly-built premises at the West Quay of the harbour.

By 1791 a new pier was constructed at the East Quay. In 1812 Europe's first steamboat service was introduced by PS Comet with frequent sailings between Glasgow, Greenock and Helensburgh, and as trade built up the pier became known as Steamboat Quay.

The custom house needed larger premises and in May 1817 the foundation stone was laid at Steamboat Quay for a Custom House building designed by William Burn, which was completed in 1818. Its gracious neoclassical architecture features a Grecian Doric portico looking out over the quay, which would eventually be renamed Custom House Quay. In 1828 the Custom House was praised as "a grand National Structure" in "the highest style of elegance". By then there were scheduled steamboat sailings to Belfast, Derry, Liverpool, Inverness, Campbeltown, the Hebrides and "all the principal places in the Highlands".

The Custom House underwent extensive refurbishment which was completed in 1989 and, until closure of the building in 2010, housed a customs and excise museum which was open to the public. In June 2008 HM Revenue and Customs (HMRC) announced that the building would close in 2011 as part of a rationalisation project with any jobs being transferred to offices in Glasgow, and despite a campaign to oppose these plans, the building closed in August 2010.

Riverside Inverclyde arranged further refurbishment works, and in 2013 announced that space had already been let to companies including PG Paper Company Ltd and Toshiba which had planning permission to form meeting rooms and an executive office in the building. Greenock Telegraph estimated that £4.1 million has been spent over five-year period for the renovation works.

=== Industry and railways ===
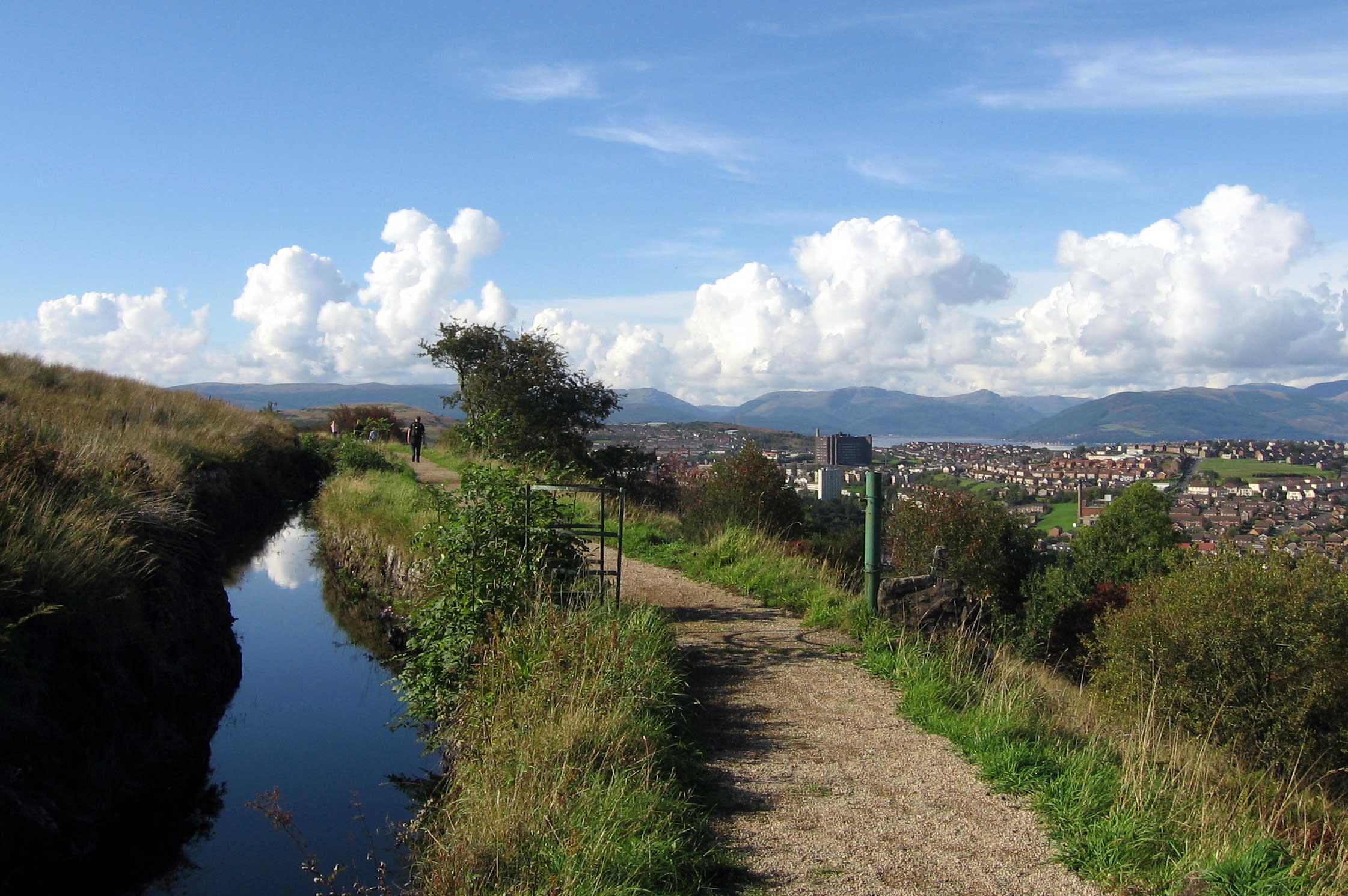
The Cut – aqueduct

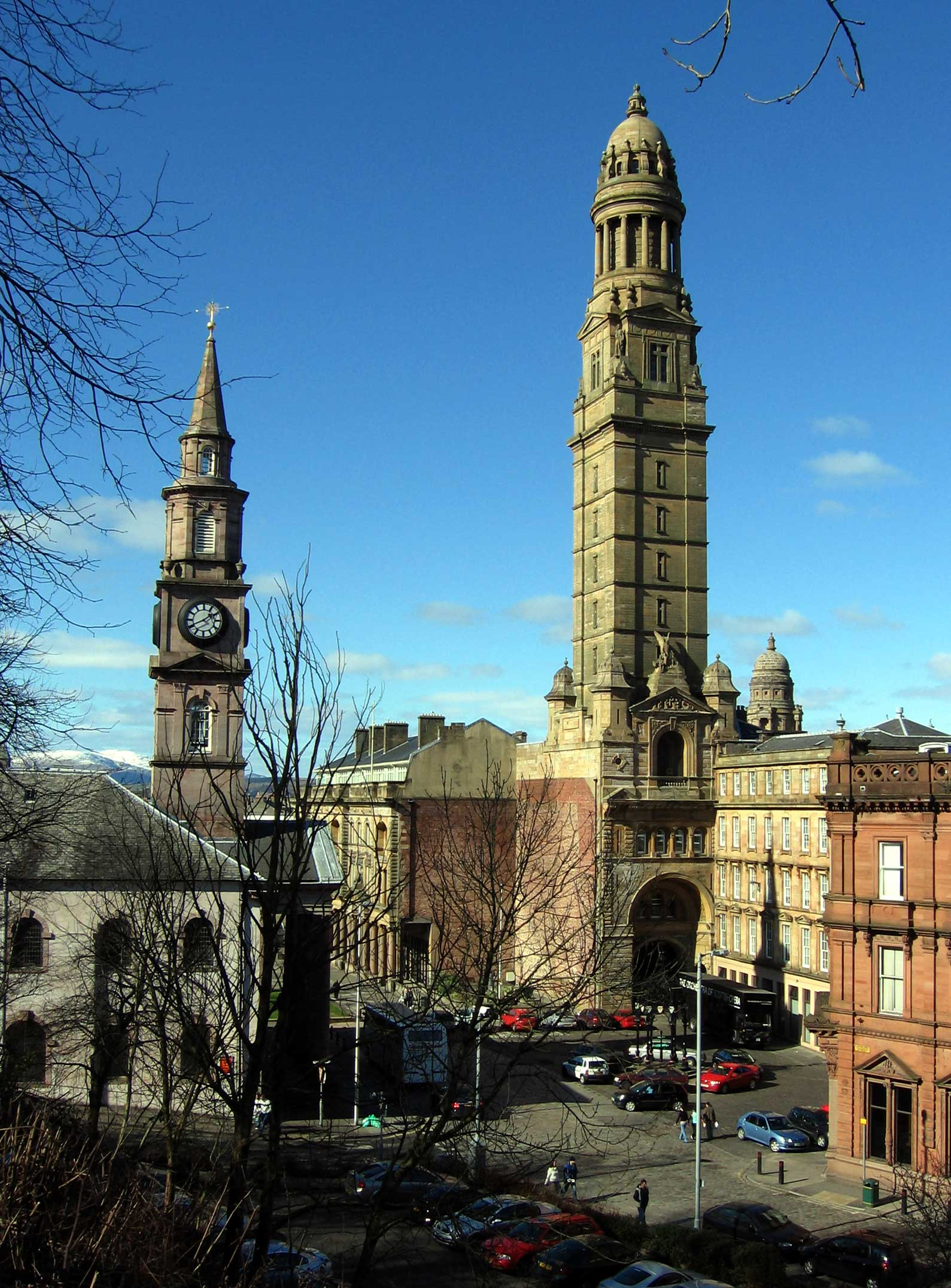
View from above Cathcart Street over Cathcart Square to Greenock Municipal Buildings, with the Victoria Tower to the right of "Cowan's Corner", and the Mid Kirk spire of 1781 to the left.

Greenock became a centre of industry, with water power being used to process imported goods. In 1827 Loch Thom was constructed as a reservoir with The Cut aqueduct, bringing water to two lines of falls for water mills to power a paper mill, cotton and woollen mills, sugar refineries and shipbuilding

Greenock Central railway station at Cathcart Street opened in 1841, for the first time providing a fast route from Glasgow to the coast linking up with Clyde steamer services. The provision of this new line meant there was no need to take the steamer all the way down river from Glasgow. In 1869 the Caledonian Railway was bypassed by the rival Greenock and Ayrshire Railway which opened a station on the waterfront at its Albert Harbour station (later renamed Princes Pier), served by a tunnel under Greenock's west end. To regain custom, the Caledonian Railway extended (what is now known as the Inverclyde Line) the Glasgow, Paisley and Greenock Railway west to Gourock; this line was built to run inland through deep cuttings and tunnels, with a tunnel under the whole length of Newton Street crossing under the other railway tunnel to emerge near Fort Matilda railway station. Spoil from the cuttings and tunnels was used to build an embankment out from the shore to a long timber wharf at Gourock railway station, providing space for railway sidings. The railway bought Wester Greenock castle and its extension, the Mansion House, and demolished them before constructing the tunnel immediately west of Greenock Central station, running under the castle grounds which now form Well Park.

Greenock's increasing importance and wealth was manifested in the construction of the Greenock Municipal Buildings, whose Victoria Tower, completed in 1886, stands 245 feet (75 metres) tall. The War of 1812 reawakened fears of American raids against Britain's ports. Earlier gun batteries had been dismantled and in 1813 ground was granted for a battery at Whitefarland Point. Fort Matilda was completed in 1818 and was sporadically modified over the century. The land to the west of this was common ground for inhabitants of the town, but in 1907 the Admiralty compulsorily purchased part of this land for a torpedo factory. The remaining space was handed over to Greenock Corporation in 1914 as a public park.

The Clyde Torpedo Factory opened in 1910, with 700 workers transferred from the Royal Arsenal, Woolwich. The site was tasked with designing and testing of torpedoes, the testing taking place in Loch Long. During the Second World War the site switched entirely to manufacturing torpedoes. The original gun battery site was occupied by the Navy Buildings, the main offices, just to the east of the torpedo factory buildings. Following WW2, in 1947, the site became fully committed to R&D as the Torpedo Experimental Establishment (TEE). TEE was closed in 1959, when all torpedo research, development and design were concentrated at the newly formed Admiralty Underwater Weapons Establishment (AUWE), Portland.

A church which became known as the Old West Kirk had been established in Greenock in 1591 under the patronage of John Schaw, the first built in Scotland since the Reformation. It was extended over the years, at an early stage the Schaw aisle provided pews for the Laird of the Barony, built as a gallery to the east of the nave of the church. Opposite it, above the front entrance, is the Crawfurdsburn or Choir Gallery. At the south end of the nave, the Sailor's Loft gallery was built in 1698 and features a 19th-century model frigate, which replaced earlier models. At the north end, the Farmer's Gallery is above the main seating area. A tower was added in the mid 19th century.

In 1926, to make way for expansion of the Harland & Wolff shipyard (the present-day location of Container Way), the Old West Kirk was relocated to a new site on the Esplanade where it still stands. The shipbuilders provided the Pirrie Hall to the south of the site: this was opened in February 1925, just after the old church closed for work to commence, and was used during the works to accommodate services, enabling the congregation to see progress on the rebuilt kirk. It then came into use as the church hall.

The church is notable for stained glass by artists such as Dante Gabriel Rossetti and Sir Edward Burne-Jones. The Church has a website.

=== Second World War ===
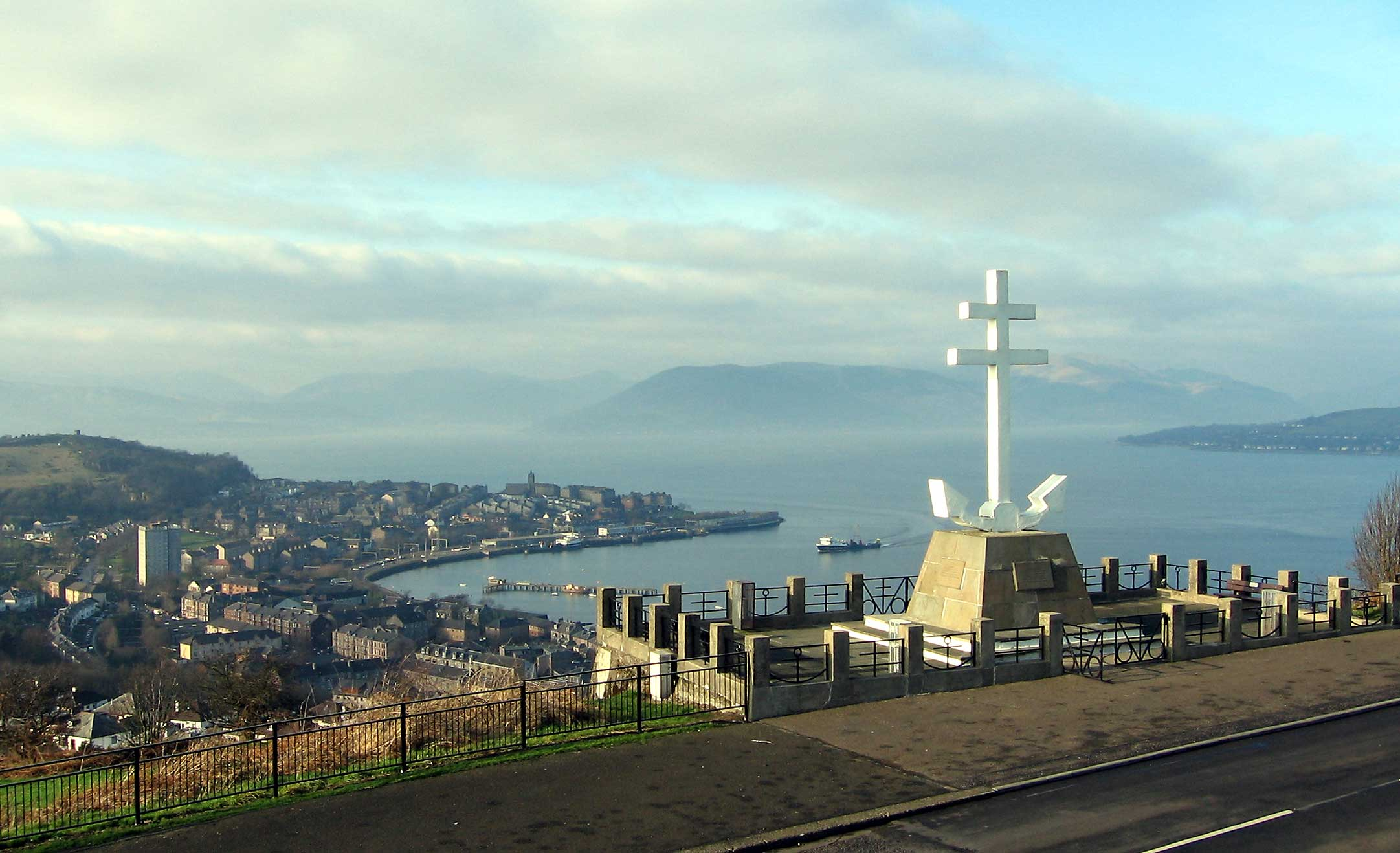
Free French Memorial on Lyle Hill overlooking Gourock

Greenock suffered badly during the Second World War and its anchorage at the Tail of the Bank became the base for the Home Fleet as well as the main assembly point for Atlantic convoys. On 30 April 1940 the French Vauquelin class destroyer Maillé Brézé blew up off Greenock with heavy loss of life following an accident involving two of her own torpedoes. Although this disaster occurred before the Free French Naval Forces were established, many people tend to regard the Cross of Lorraine on Lyle Hill as a memorial to the loss of the Maillé Brézé as well as to the later losses of the Free French Naval Forces which sailed from the town. On the nights of 6 May and 7 May 1941 around 300 Luftwaffe aircraft attacked the town in the Greenock Blitz.

On 10 October 1940, RAF Greenock was created as a maintenance base for RAF flying boats. The base was hit on 7 May 1941 during the Greenock Blitz.

A large building housing a drapery business constructed on Cowan's property at the corner of the Municipal Buildings was badly damaged and was demolished, leaving the blank brick corner area still known as "Cowan's Corner". This was later landscaped and used as a garden. The neighbouring Municipal Buildings was also severely damaged during the bombings, which soon led to the loss of a Southern Tower, and two pediments situated on top of the South Façade of the buildings.

=== Post–war years ===
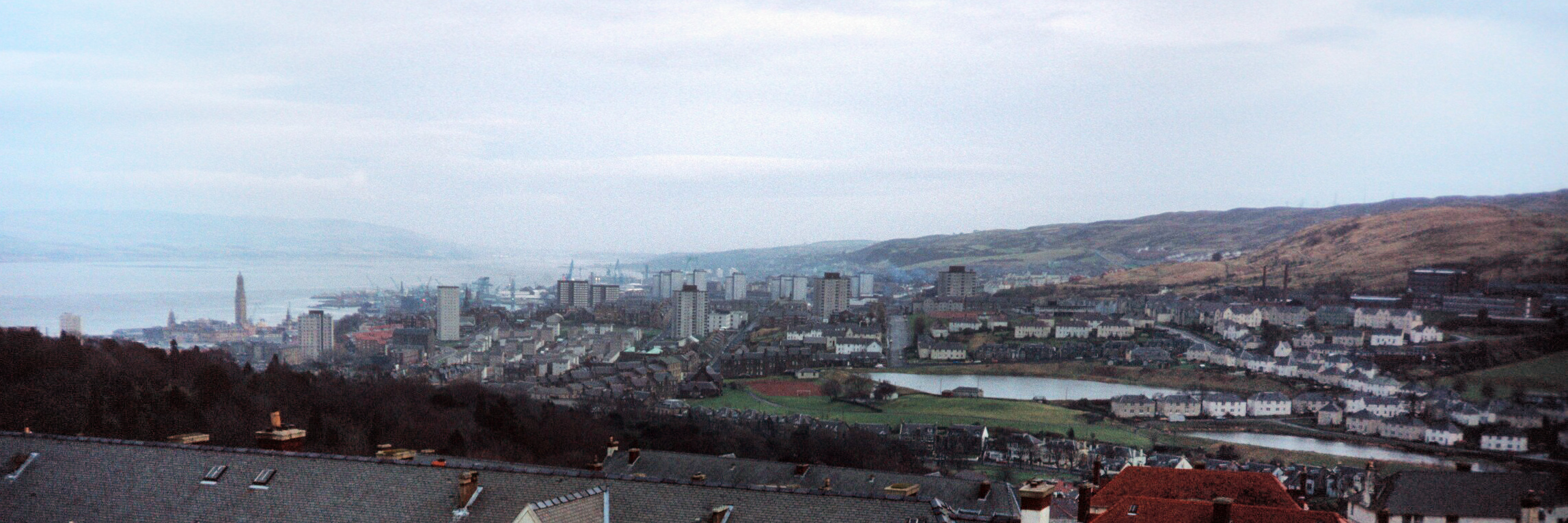
Panoramic view of Greenock in 1983 with numerous tower blocks visible

Greenock thrived in the post-war years but as the heavy industries declined in the 1970s and 1980s unemployment became a major problem, and it has only been in the last ten years with reinvestment and the redevelopment of large sections of the town that the local economy has started to revive. Tourism has appeared as an unexpected bonus with the development of the Clydeport container port as Ocean Terminal, a passenger terminal for cruise ships touring the Atlantic. Students who do not travel further afield for study often attend the Greenock campus of West College Scotland (formerly known as James Watt College of Further and Higher Education).

Greenock reached its population peak in 1921 (81,123) and was once the sixth largest town in Scotland.

== Governance ==
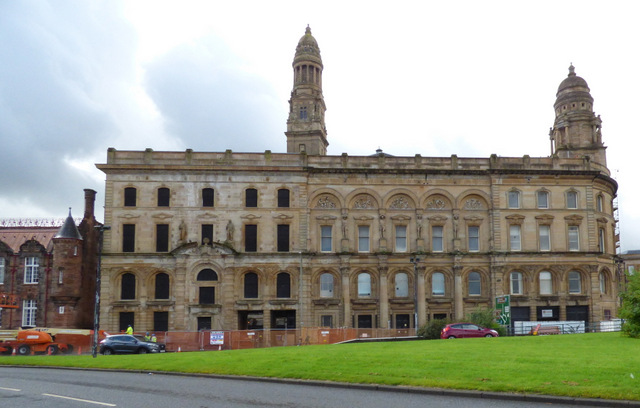
Greenock Municipal Buildings

Until 1974, Greenock was a parliamentary burgh in its own right. It was merged with Port Glasgow to form Greenock and Port Glasgow constituency. In 1997, it became Greenock and Inverclyde. After the redistribution of Scottish seats, it was merged into an enlarged Inverclyde constituency – the first time in political history that Greenock has not been named in a parliamentary seat. Greenock and Inverclyde remains a Scottish Parliament constituency.

Greenock is the administrative centre of Inverclyde Council, the local authority responsible for the wider Inverclyde area in which Greenock is located. The council is based in the Greenock Municipal Buildings.

== Climate ==
Greenock

Climate chart (precipitation, max. and min. temperature)
J	F	M	A	M	J	J	A	S	O	N	D
75 6 1	55 7 1	54 8 2	38 11 3	34 15 6	35 17 9	39 19 11	52 18 11	45 16 8	81 12 6	68 9 3	69 7 2
- █ Average max. and min. temperatures in °C
- █ Precipitation totals in mm
- Source: Precipitation
Imperial conversion
J	F	M	A	M	J	J	A	S	O	N	D
2.9 43 34	2.1 45 34	2.1 46 36	1.5 52 37	1.4 59 43	1.4 63 48	1.5 66 52	2.1 64 52	1.8 61 46	3.2 54 43	2.7 48 37	2.7 45 36
- █ Average max. and min. temperatures in °F
- █ Precipitation totals in inches

Greenock's climate is temperate maritime having mainly cool summers and mild winters. The coastal location means that the heat capacity of seawater helps keep winter temperatures higher than locations just a few miles inland.

Although there has been recent debate the moderating influence of the North Atlantic Drift, a warm oceanic current that is the eastern extension of the Gulf Stream, means that Greenock's average temperature is approximately one degree Celsius greater than eastern Scottish coastal towns on the same latitude (55.94 degrees north); whilst in winter, Greenock is considerably warmer than continental locations at the same latitude, such as Moscow.

Anecdotally Greenock has a reputation for receiving higher than average rainfall (the song The Green Oak Tree comments on this). Whilst the rainfall is indeed higher than the average recorded at Scottish weather stations, the greatest rainfall in Scotland occurs on the west (ocean) facing mountain slopes of Lochaber, near Fort William in the Highlands.

Greenock's latitude means long hours of daylight in midsummer with the opposite true in midwinter. On the summer solstice, usually observed on the 21 June, the sun rises at 04:31 and sets at 22:07. On the winter solstice, usually 21 December, the sun rises at 08:46 and sets at 15:44.

== Education ==
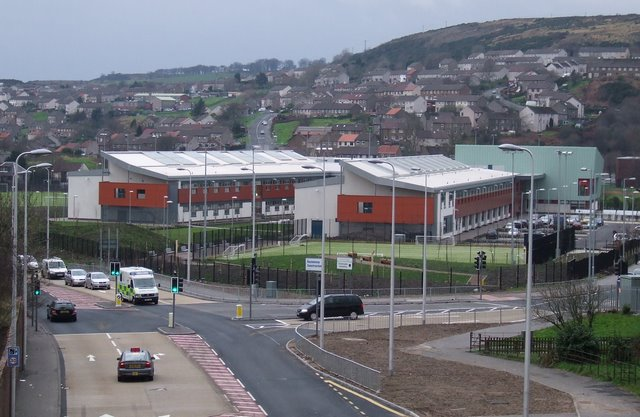
Inverclyde Academy (2012)

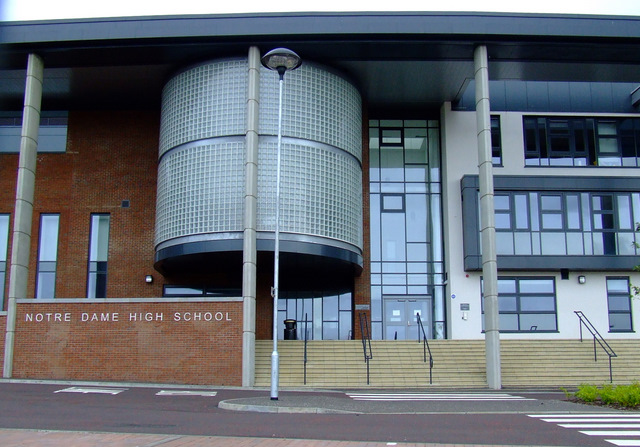
Notre Dame High School (2011)

The Highlanders academy was built in 1837, partly by subscription, and partly by grant from government, on a site given by the late Sir Michael Shaw Stewart.

Greenock has the following primary schools as of 2023:

- Ardgowan Primary School, on Newton Street
- Lady Alice Primary School, on Gateside Avenue
- St Josephs R C Primary School, on Wren Road
- St Mary's Catholic Primary School, on Patrick Street
- St Patricks Primary School, on Cornhaddock Street
- Whinhill Primary School, on Peat Road
- Aileymill Primary School, on Norfolk Road
- St Andrew's Primary School, on Chester Road
- All Saints Primary School, on Blairmore Road
- King's Oak Primary School, on East Crawford Street

Greenock has the following high schools as of 2023:

- Notre Dame High School, on Dunlop Street
- Inverclyde Academy, on Cumberland Road
- Clydeview Academy, on Burnside Road

Greenock has another educational establishment:

- Lomond View Academy

Greenock used to have a private school, the Cedars School of Excellence. However, it closed down in September 2024 after 25 years of running, due to rising costs.

== Health ==
The Greenock Infirmary, later the Royal Infirmary, was established in 1809, when a building was erected at an expense of £1815, on a site of land given by Sir John Shaw Stewart. Today, the town is served by the Inverclyde Royal Hospital which is located in Greenock serving the population of Inverclyde, Largs, the Isle of Bute and the Cowal Peninsula. The hospital was commissioned to replace the Greenock Royal Infirmary, the Eye Infirmary, Gateside Hospital, Duncan Macpherson Hospital and Broadstone Jubilee Hospital. Construction work started at the end of August 1970 and the hospital was completed in 1979.

In 2004 Inverclyde Royal Hospital faced proposals for a major downsizing with the loss of the accident and emergency department and the acute surgical ward in an effort to save costs. Many people criticised the plans complaining that the Inverclyde Royal Hospital was being seen as nothing more than a large health centre. In February 2007, after undertaking a review, NHS Greater Glasgow and Clyde proposed retaining the accident and emergency department and core inpatient services, including the trauma and emergency medical departments at Inverclyde Royal Hospital and submitted this proposal to the Scottish Government for approval.

Langhill Clinic situated behind Inverclyde Royal Hospital is now the main psychiatric hospital with an IPCU unit and Day hospital alongside the main psychiatric ward.

== Economy ==
=== Economic history ===
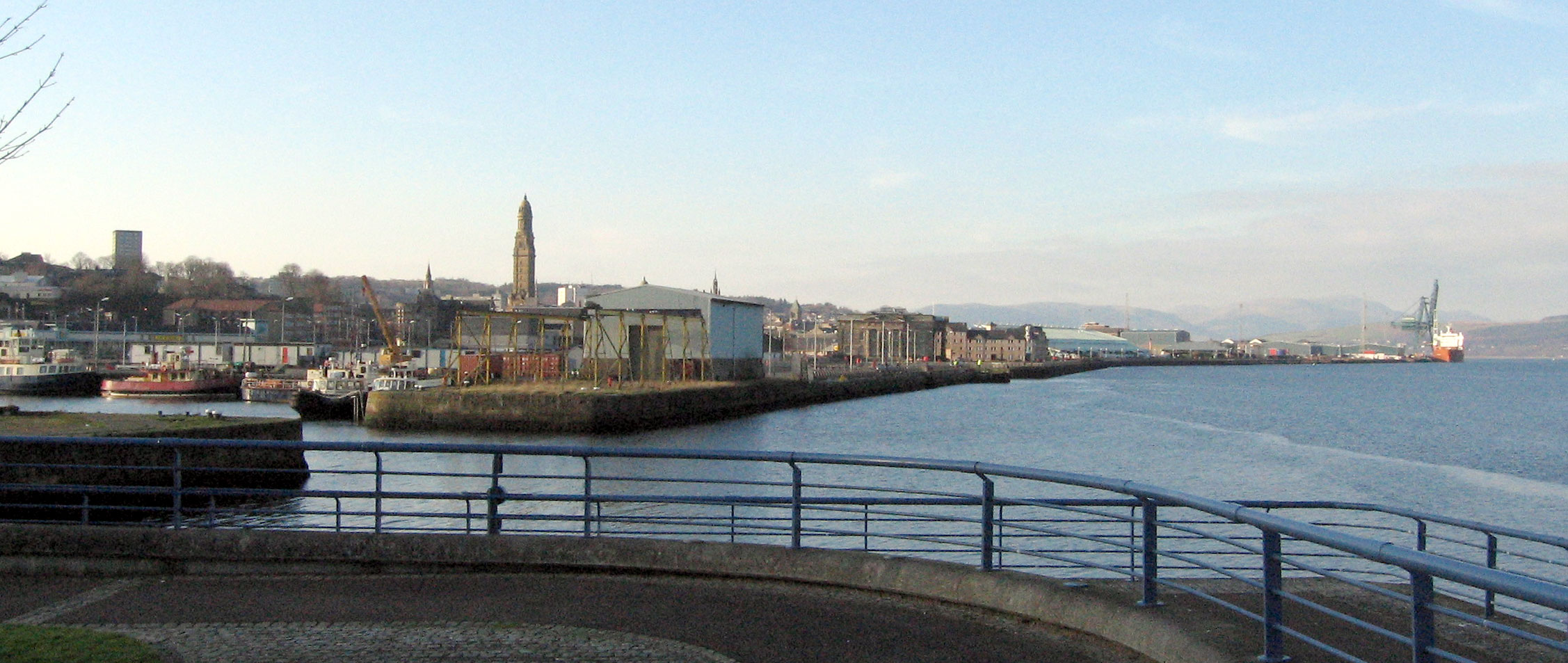
Greenock waterfront from Victoria Harbour to Ocean Terminal, the skyline dominated by Victoria Tower.

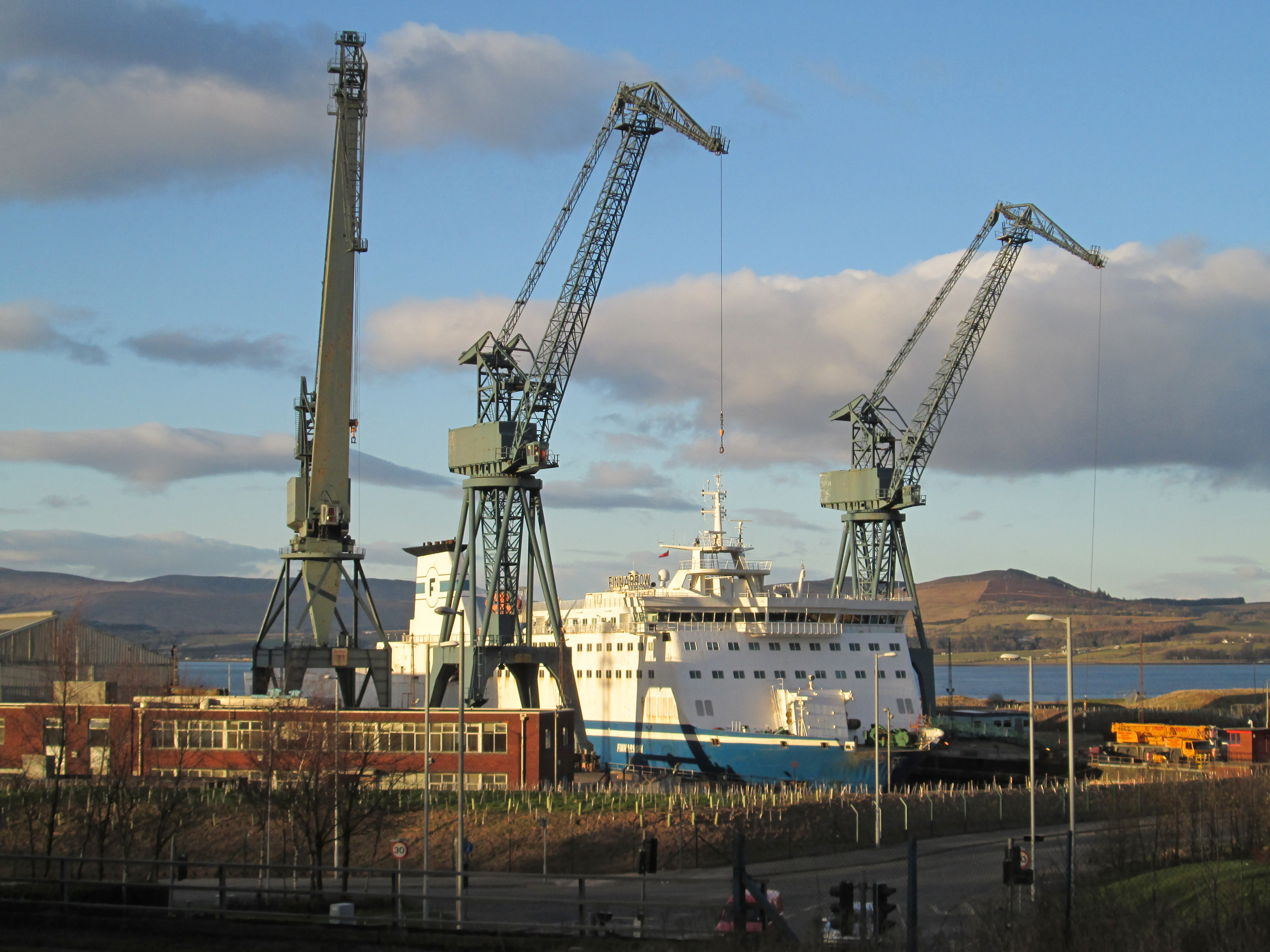
The Inchgreen Drydock lacked major repair work for almost a decade, then in March 2013 it was used for urgent repairs to the ro-ro Stena Line ferry Finnarrow. The cranes were later demolished in July 2017.

Historically, the town relied on shipbuilding, sugar refining and wool manufacturing for employment, but none of these industries are today part of Greenock's economy. More recently the town relied heavily on electronics manufacture. However, this has given way mostly to: call centre business, insurance, banking and shipping export.

The Fleming and Reid merino wool mill employed 500 people – mostly women and produced wool garments spun and woven at the mill. This mill was at the corner of Drumfrochar Road and Mill Road.

As of October 2012 Greenock has an unemployment rate of 5.3%, above the Scottish average of 3.9% (figure is for the Scottish Parliament constituency and includes Gourock, Inverkip, Port Glasgow and Wemyss Bay).

=== Shipbuilding ===
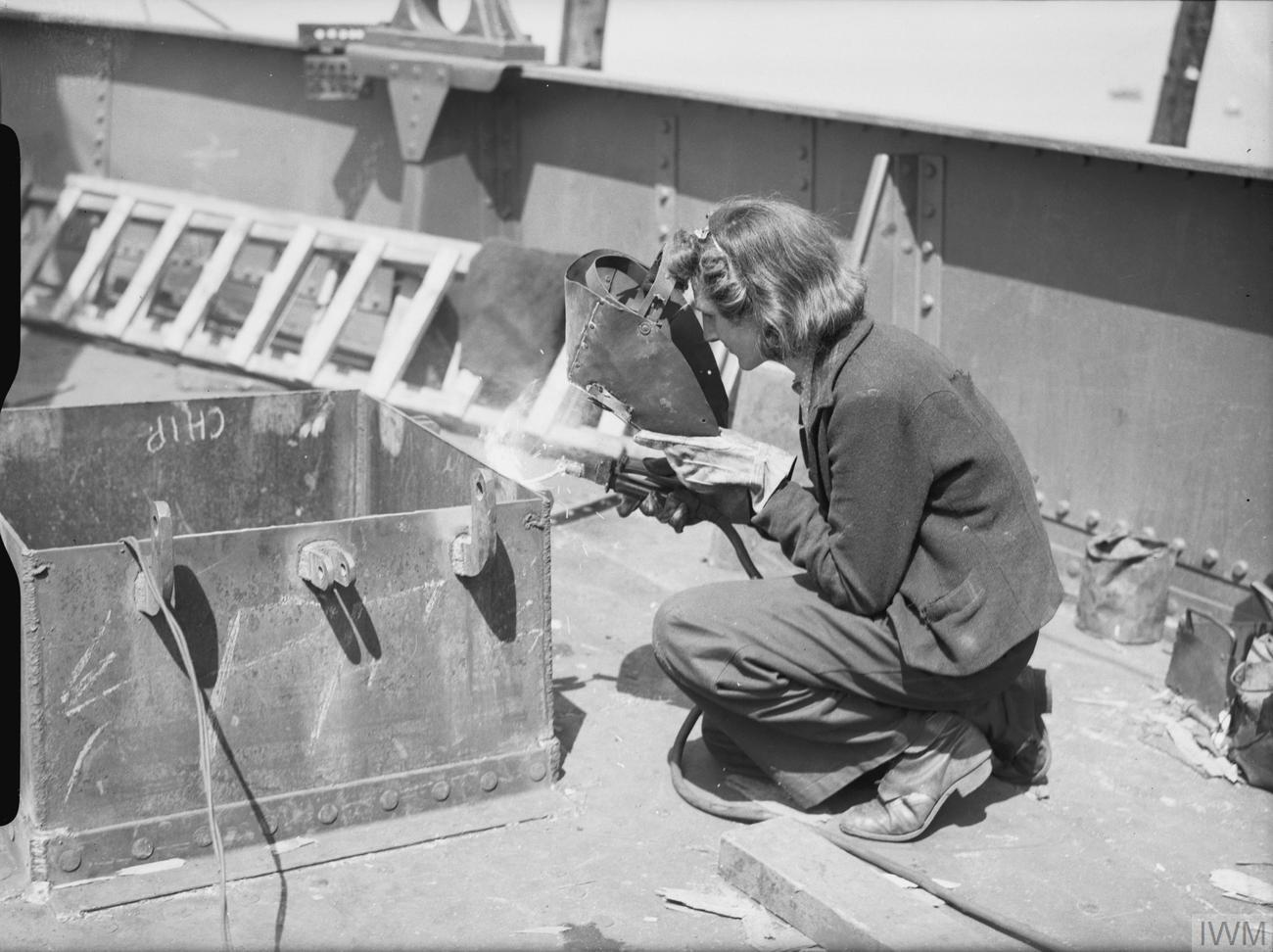
A welder working on a mine-sweeping trawler at Greenock, June 1942

In the early 17th century, the first pier was built in Greenock. Shipbuilding was already an important employer by this time. The first proper harbour was constructed in 1710 and the first well-known shipbuilders, Scotts Shipbuilding and Engineering Company, was established the following year. It gained numerous contracts with the Royal Navy from 1806, building ships such as Glasgow.

In 1967 Scott's was merged with Lithgows (founded 1874, later the largest privately owned yard in the world) the same year becoming Scott Lithgow, which was later nationalised as part of British Shipbuilders in 1977. From 1800 to 1980 many thousands of people worked to design, build and repair ships. The reduction in shipbuilding in the 1970s and 1980s meant that none of these companies are still trading.

Greenock Shipbuilders included: Scotts, Browns, William Lithgows, Fergusons, Steeles and Head the Boat Builder (lifeboats). Other marine engineering related companies included engine-makers – Kincaids, Scotts, Rankin and Blackmore (which included the Eagle Foundry) – ship repair (Lamonts) and Hasties for steering gear. Yacht builders included Adams and McLean (at Cardwell Bay). Other yards included Cartsburn, Cartsdyke, and Klondyke – all of which closed during the 1970s and 1980s due to competition from South Korea and Japan.

Part of the site of the Scott's yard, is now an EE call centre, and the Kingston Yard was redeveloped for housing. Shipbuilding is now continued at Ferguson Marine Engineering in nearby Port Glasgow, after Ferguson Shipbuilders was taken over by Jim McColl and began modernisation. Ship repair work continues at the Garvel Drydock in Greenock's Great Harbour.

The Inchgreen Drydock was opened in 1964 as one of the largest in the world at 305 m long and 48 m wide. It was used to re-fit the RMS Queen Elizabeth, and to fit-out the QE2. In 1966 it came under the nationalised Clydeport, which was privatised in 1982 and in 2003 was sold to Peel Ports of The Peel Group. They subsequently operated the drydock as part of their Cammell Laird shipbuilding subsidiary. Peel Ports put the drydock on the market for a lease in 2014, and Jim McColl opened discussions on leasing the dock to expand Fergusons' shipbuilding, but nothing came of the negotiations. On 1 May 2017, Clydeport stated that the drydock cranes are to be demolished. In November 2021 it was announced that the dock had been leased to Atlas Decommissioning as a site for breaking up marine vessels.

=== Shipping ===
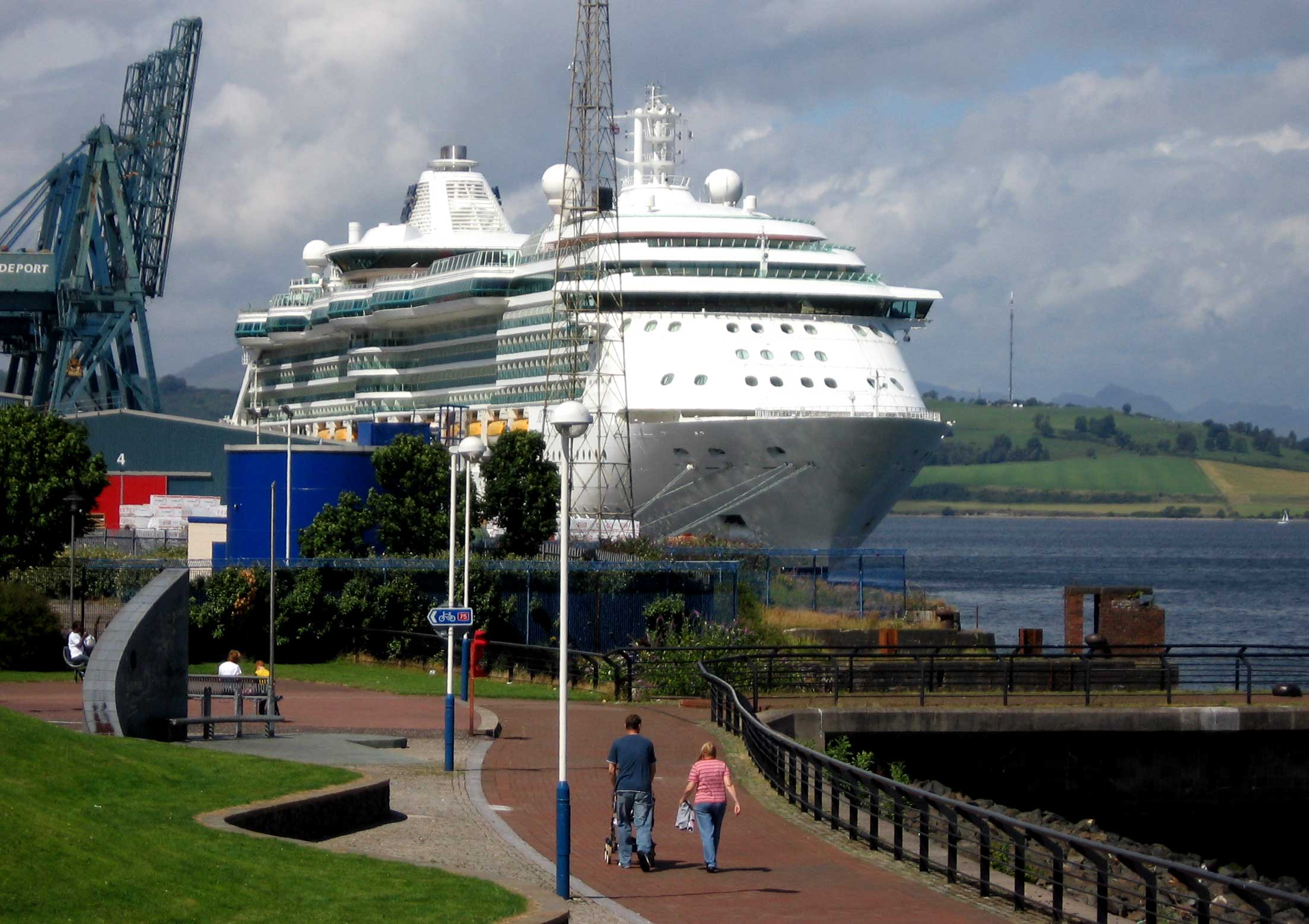
MV Jewel of the Seas at Greenock (2006)

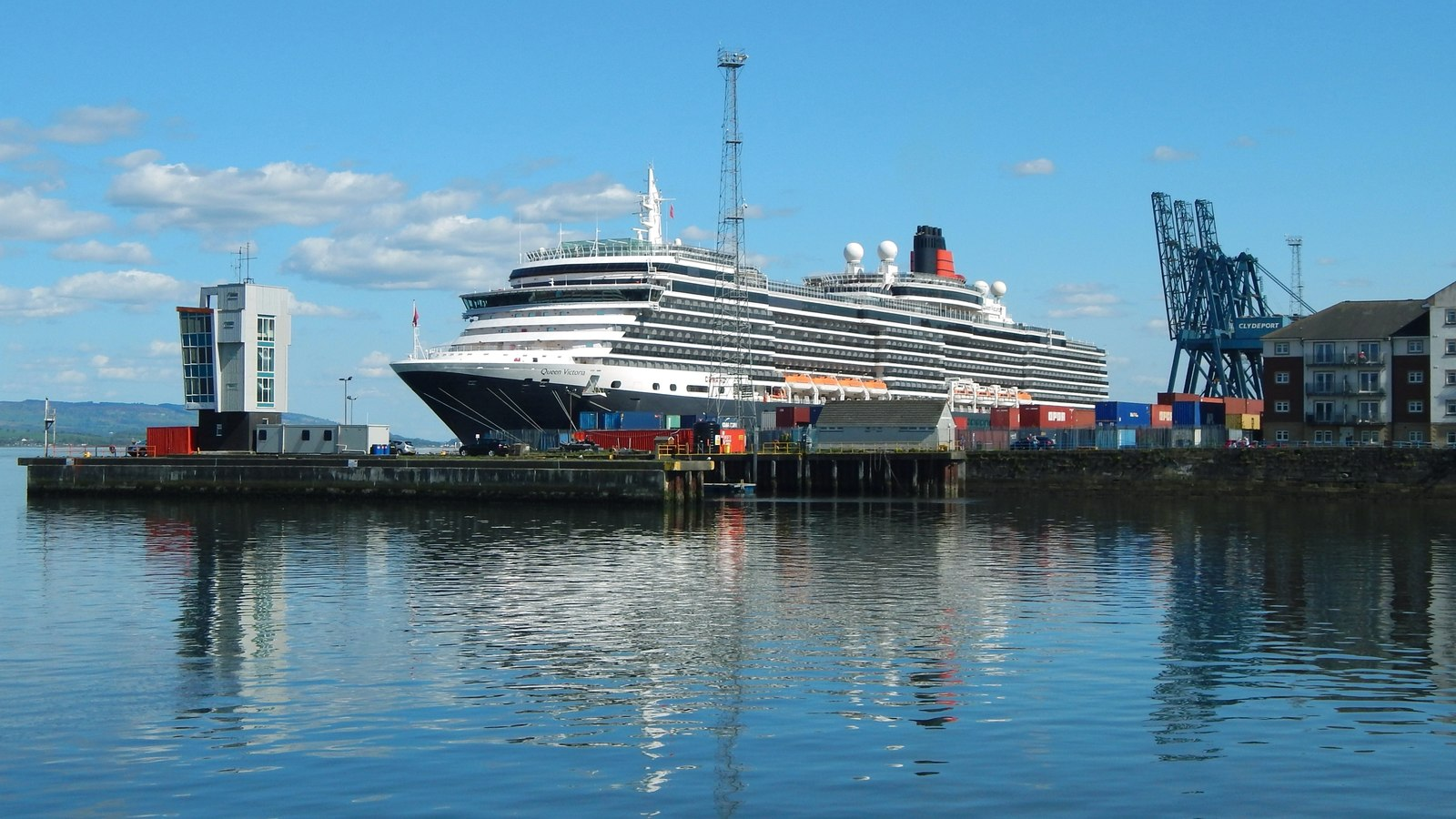
MS Queen Victoria moored at Greenock (2018)

Freight traffic is handled at the container cranes of Greenock's Ocean Terminal, at Prince's Pier which was constructed for the Glasgow and South Western Railway. The same terminal is a regular port of call for cruise liners visiting the west of Scotland.

Greenock was a regular port of call for Cunard Line and Canadian Pacific in the 1950s and 1960s. Ships on the Montreal to Liverpool transit would anchor at the Tail of the Bank off Greenock in the Firth of Clyde and steam paddlewheel ferries would service the liners. Cunard operated: the RMS Ivernia (1954), RMS Saxonia (1955), RMS Carinthia (1956) and RMS Sylvania (1957). These four ships were built at John Brown & Company shipyards, typically 22,000 tons, twin screw, 600 passengers. CP operated the Empress of Britain (1956), Empress of Canada and Empress of England.

Greenock's Great Harbour is one of the three main ports providing marine services support to the Royal Navy, in dual site operation with Faslane at HMNB Clyde on the Gare Loch. 240 staff of the former Royal Maritime Auxiliary Service were transferred to Serco Denholm under a 15-year £1bn PFI contract awarded in December 2007. This facility means that "Admiralty" boats and tugs are a common sight on the Clyde.

Greenock's attractive esplanade provides a gently curving riverside walk just over a mile (1.6 km) long extending to the west from Ocean Terminal to the Royal West of Scotland Amateur Boat Club sailing, kayaking and rowing facilities, which originated as a rowing club built against the east wall of Fort Matilda in 1866, and was granted its present title in 1885. The present clubhouse dates from 1878, and was subsequently extended.

Fort Matilda was adapted for various purposes, eventually becoming the Navy Buildings which housed a main Her Majesty's Coastguard centre until it closed in December 2012, as well as a Royal Naval Reserve establishment, HMS Dalriada. The buildings have now been demolished, as a site for blocks of flats off Eldon Street.

=== Sugar ===
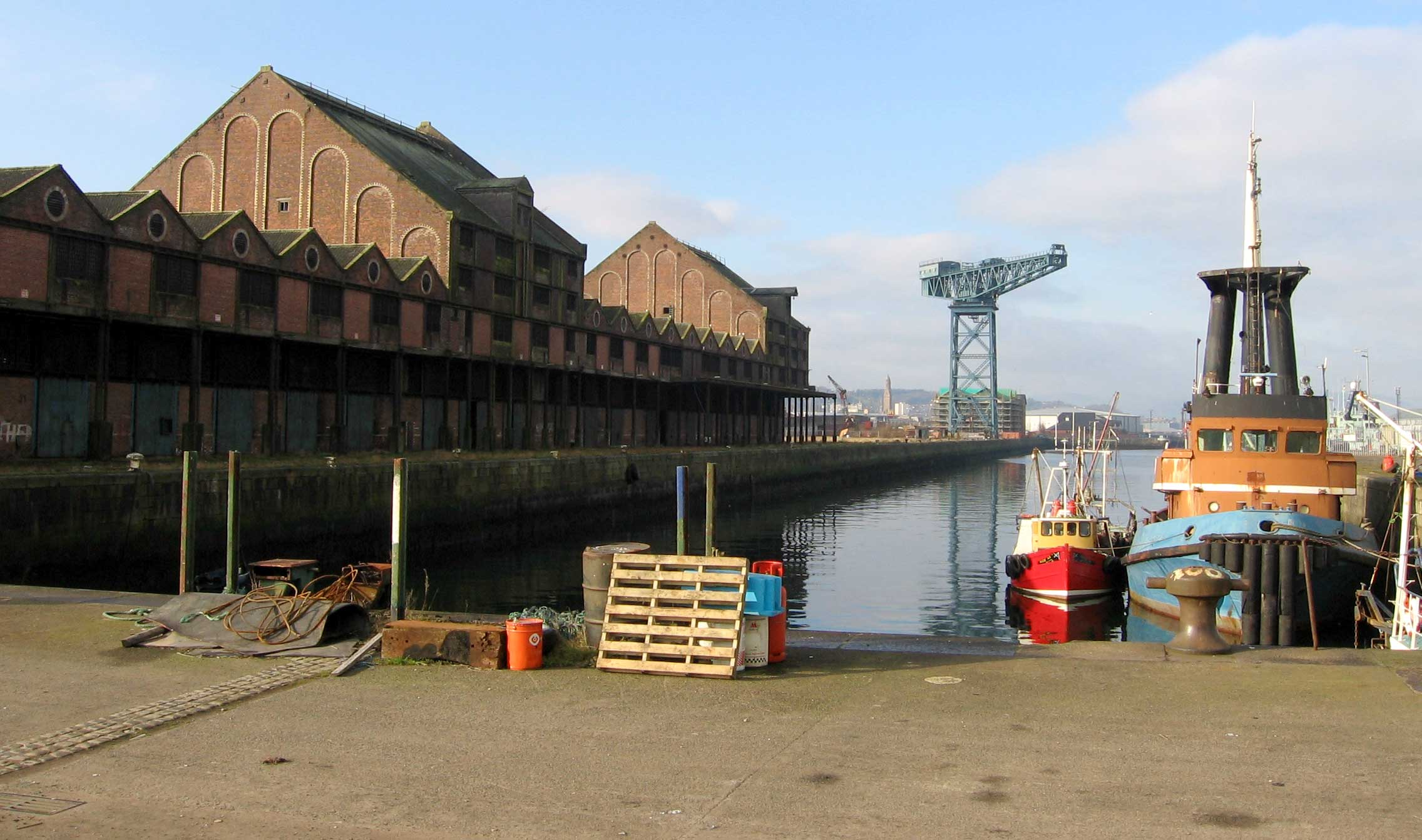
The Sugar Shed dominates the James Watt Dock

Sugar refining began in Greenock in 1765. John Walker began a sugar refinery in Greenock in 1850 followed by the prominent local cooper and shipowner Abram Lyle who, with four partners, purchased the Glebe Sugar Refinery in 1865. Another 12 refineries were active at one point. The most successful of these was Tate & Lyle. It was formed from a merger in 1921 between Abram Lyle, who had expanded into Plaistow, and Henry Tate, who had set up a sugar refinery in Liverpool and had expanded into London.

The James Watt Dock, opened in 1886, provided shipping and shipbuilding facilities including a large warehouse (known as the Sugar Shed) which was used for both imported raw sugar, and refined sugar ready for delivery. By the end of the 19th century, around 400 ships a year were transporting sugar from Caribbean holdings to Greenock for processing. There were 14 sugar refineries, including The Westburn, Walkers, The Glebe, Lochore and Ferguson and Dempster, plus a sugar beet factory on Ingleston Street. Tobacco from the Americas also arrived here.

When Tate and Lyle finally closed its Greenock refinery in 1997 it brought to an end the town's 150-year-old connections with sugar manufacture. A newly built sugar warehouse continued shipping operations at Greenock's Ocean Terminal. The former sugar warehouse at the James Watt Dock was by then scheduled as a category A listed building as a fine example of early industrial architecture, with an unusual feature of a colonnade of cast iron columns forming a sheltered unloading area next to the quayside. This building has since lain empty, with various schemes being proposed for conversion and restoration. The photographs show the building still intact in February 2006, but a fire on the evening of 12 June 2006 caused severe damage to much of the building before being brought under control in the early hours of 13 June. The local council confirmed that parts of the building will have to be taken down to ensure public safety, but promised an investigation and emphasised the importance of this world heritage building.

In 2007, approval was given to proposals for a major regeneration project. As of 2018, the building and adjacent area of the dock accommodated a marina.

=== Electronics ===
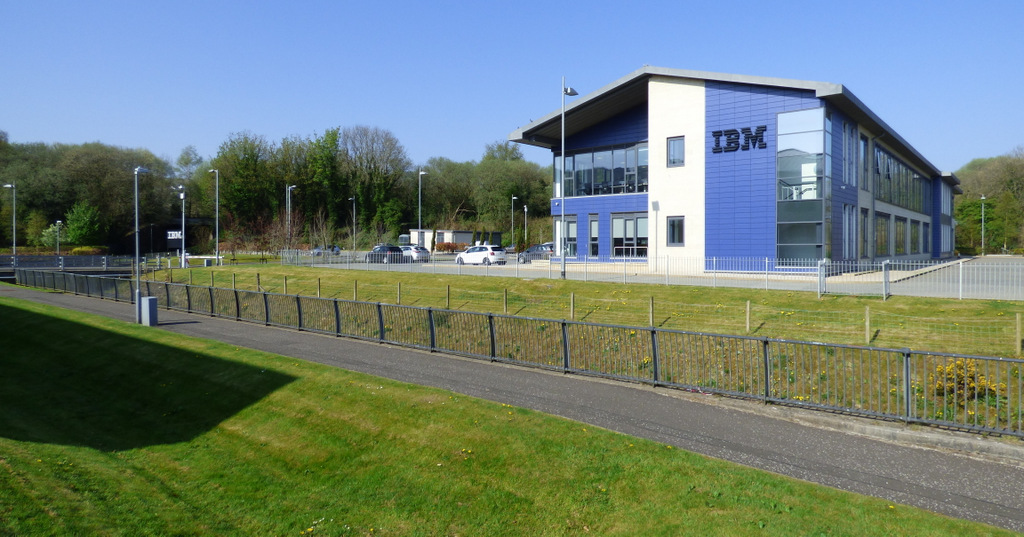
The IBM facility in Greenock (2019)

Since IBM arrived in the town in 1951, electronics and light manufacturing have, until recently, been the mainstay of local employment. Texas Instruments (and before that National Semiconductor) ran a silicon wafer manufacturing plant in the town from 1970 until 2019, when the plant was transferred to Diodes Incorporated.

However, with manufacturing moving to Eastern Europe and Asia, work has shifted to the service sector, especially call centres. EE and IBM both had major call centre operations in Greenock. EE's call centre closed in 2024, and IBM left Greenock in 2023. The Royal Bank of Scotland continue to operate a Mortgage Centre that processes Mortgage applications from throughout the UK & Ireland.

IBM closed their entire factory in Greenock which is in the process of being demolished. Sanmina, another electronics company, took over much of the IBM installation but moved 370 jobs to Hungary in 2006. The Sanmina plant, which consisted of the former IBM AMDC (Automated Materials Distribution Centre) and Modules buildings 1 to 5, has since ceased operation and was demolished in 2009. The Spango Valley site was rebranded as "Valley Park" in late 2009. Lenovo has also re-located away from Greenock, and the plant is now at 10% of the 1999/2000 capacity. As of 2020 the site of IBM in Spango Valley had been completely demolished.

=== Trade and commerce ===
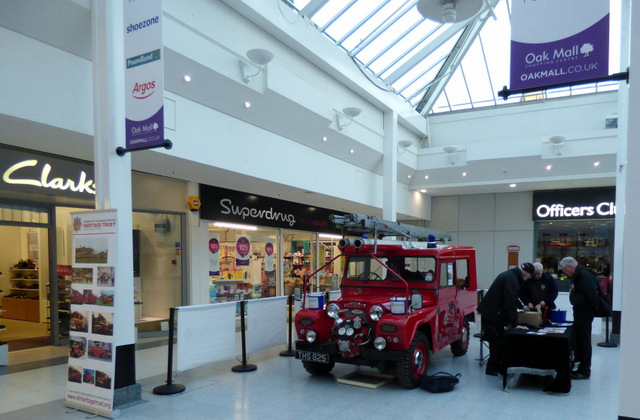
Shopping outlets in the Oak Mall

Greenock's main shopping thoroughfare was Hamilton Street, which connected West Blackhall Street in the west to Clyde Square in the east. In 1975, it disappeared along with several other central streets, as the area was pedestrianised as Hamilton Way. In 1992, it was covered and enclosed as an 85-unit centre by Covell and Matthews for then-clients Ossory Road Estates as The Oak Mall (in administration as of 21 November 2013). Since then, it has faced a major decline, and has been supplanted as Inverclyde's main shopping area by the retail park in Port Glasgow. Among the current occupants of the Oak Mall include: Argos, Boots, New Look, Primark, as well as other clothing stores, restaurants, cafes and discount stores.

In 1936, a Marks and Spencer store was opened. The original building became part of the Oak Mall, which was simply built during the first phase of pedestrianisation, where it remained until the store closed down, and moved to a new unit in Port Glasgow. In its place, is a collection of separate small markets, under the unit name of Bluebell Walk. Popular retail chain Woolworths used to operate in a unit in the Oak Mall until it fell into administration. It was replaced by a Wilkinsons store, which soon saw the same fate as its predecessor. It is now a Poundland.

The Oak Mall has had several issues for many years, such as flooding caused by leaks from the ageing and deterioration of the A78 flyover that is above the Oak Mall. As of major redevelopment projects taking place in Greenock, the eastern side of the Oak Mall, as well as the A78 flyover, and Hector McNeil House will be demolished in the beginning of 2025 after many years of plans and discussions.

On 24 November 1970, Tesco opened their first Scottish store in Greenock, on Westburn Street. It later operated under Bejam, which was bought by Iceland, who currently operates in the same location. Tesco has also operated in 3 other stores in Greenock: The store on West Stewart Street was the replacement after the first store closed. The other stores operated on Inverkip Street and Dalrymple Street. The latter is currently the only Tesco store, which also has a filling station on-site.

Other major supermarket chains, such as Aldi, Lidl and Morrisons also have a presence in the town. A small retail estate containing stores and restaurants is opposite the Waterfront swimming pool and leisure centre. Elsewhere, small groups of shops in most of the areas of the town provide for everyday essentials.

== Transport ==
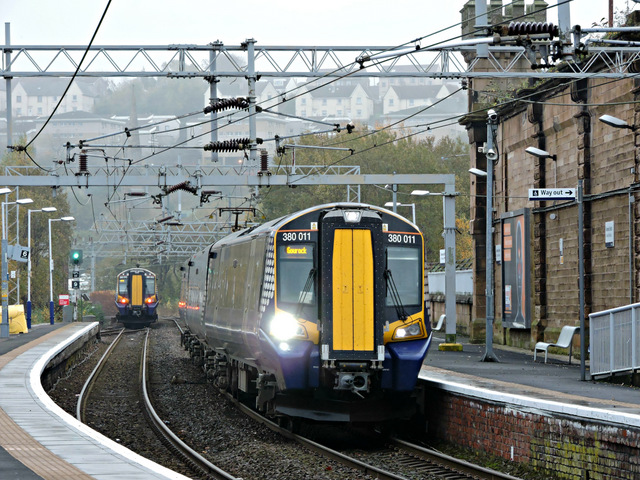
Greenock Central

Greenock is Scotland's best served town in terms of railway stations. It boasts eight: Bogston, Cartsdyke, Greenock Central, Greenock West, Fort Matilda, Whinhill, Drumfrochar and Branchton. A ninth station, located at the former IBM complex, is currently mothballed pending redevelopment of the site. Only Glasgow has a much greater number of stations and Edinburgh possesses only two more. Greenock has a railway tunnel at 1.2 miles (1.9 km) in length. Located directly under Newton Street in the town, the tunnel allowed for the extension of the railway to Gourock.

A new £20m ocean terminal was opened in August 2023, which will see more than 100 cruise ships yearly. The terminal has already seen many major ships, such as the new Cunard ship MS Queen Anne as part of its maiden voyage. In March 2024, Princess Anne visited Greenock on a royal engagement, as part of the 60th anniversary of the MV Hebridean Princess, who was at the time docked nearby. The ocean terminal was part of the visit, where Princess Anne received a tour of the terminal, and learned more about the area, and its history.

Greenock is served by a number of local bus routes covering the majority of Greenock, Gourock and Port Glasgow. Long-distance services travel regularly to Glasgow, Largs and Dunoon. The majority of routes are run by McGill's Bus Services. The Largs to Glasgow corridor is served by two services, the 901, 906, which provide a bus along this route every 15 minutes for most of the day. The 531 service also offers travel from Greenock to Glasgow, serving the Slaemuir area of Port Glasgow before connecting with the X7 Service and continuing through Bridge of Weir, Houston and Linwood, then joining the motorway to Braehead before heading into Glasgow City Centre.

Greenock is located at the end of the A8 road/M8 motorway which begins in Edinburgh. It is also the northern terminus of Euroroute E05 which heads south through England, France and Spain, ending at the Spanish port and container terminal of Algeciras.

== Culture ==
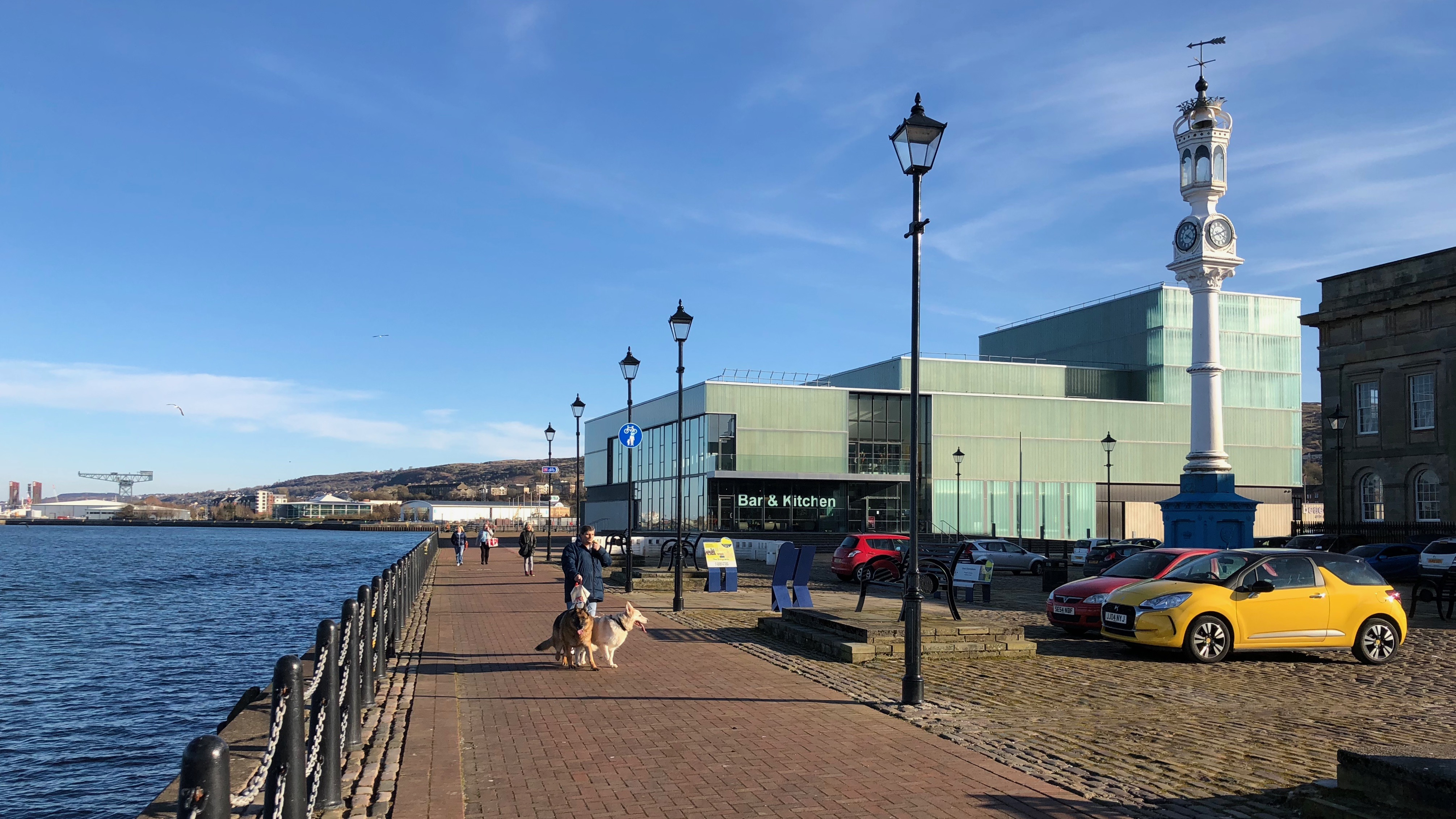
The Beacon Arts Centre, with first floor Gallery Suite and ground floor café & bar looking out over the Custom House Quay waterfront and the Clyde.

Greenock is home to the world's first Burns Club, The Mother Club, which was founded in 1801 by merchants born in Ayrshire, some of whom had personally known Robert Burns. They held the world's first Burns Supper on what they believed was his birthday on 29 January 1802, but the following year; discovered from the Ayr parish records that the correct date was actually 25 January 1759.

The Victorian landscape artist John Atkinson Grimshaw depicted a somewhat idealised Greenock in several of his paintings.

The Watt Institution (McLean Museum) is the largest museum in the Inverclyde area. Among the museums collection are exhibitions on James Watt, fine arts, exhibits about the history of shipbuilding on the Clyde, and a collection of Ancient Egyptian artefacts.

The Beacon Arts Centre opened in 2013 in a new building at Greenock's Custom House Quay. It provides a 500-seat theatre that hosts a regular programme of plays, concerts, musical events, comedians and other events and a Studio Theatre, as well as a multifunction Gallery Suite providing rehearsal and meeting rooms which combine for event or performance space, with views over the Clyde. On the ground floor a café & bar also has wide views. The Beacon is owned by the Greenock Arts Guild, and replaced the former Arts Guild Theatre.

Along the Custom House Quay is The Wyllieum, a museum commemorating George Wyllie, a Scottish artist who in his later life resided in Inverclyde. The museum opened in April 2024.

Greenock hosted the National Mòd in 1904 and 1925.

=== In television ===
The 1974 BBC Scotland adaptation of the Para Handy novels, entitled The Vital Spark, was filmed in Greenock. In 2012, Greenock became the setting for the BBC television drama Waterloo Road, after the series was relocated from Rochdale, Greater Manchester. The series was shot at Greenock Academy, a former secondary school in the west of the town. The British TV series Annika uses the Beacon Arts Centre as the homicide unit's base.

=== In film ===
Greenock has featured as the backdrop to several films: the television films Just a Boys' Game (1979), Down Where the Buffalo Go (1988) and Down Among the Big Boys (1993) and the cinema films Sweet Sixteen (2002), Dear Frankie (2004) and Badla (2019). An early Danny Boyle film Leaving (1988) was shot here. In Rob Roy, which is set in the mid-eighteenth century, Greenock is referred to as "the port to new world".

=== In literature ===
Greenock is one of the settings for Alan Sharp's 1965 novel A Green Tree in Gedde. It is fictionalised as 'Gantock' by Robin Jenkins in his 1979 novel Fergus Lamont (The Gantocks are a rocky shoal in the Firth of Clyde nearby, just off Dunoon). Alasdair Gray's 1984 novel 1982, Janine is set in a Greenock hotel room. Matthew Fitt's cyberpunk novel But'n'Ben A-Go-Go features a submerged Greenock after the effects of global warming. Greenock has featured in the poetry of W.S. Graham (evoking his childhood) and Douglas Dunn.

Greenock features in Charles Nodier's 1832 romantic fairy-tale novel La fée aux miettes as the original home and final destination of the eponymous "Crumb Fairy," who, at the beginning of the story is trapped in France. In Promenade from Dieppe to the Mountains of Scotland, his account of a 50-day journey to Scotland in 1821, Nodier described Greenock as “one of the ornaments of Renfrewshire” ("la charmante ville de Greenok [sic], un des ornements de Renfrew").

The novel The Greenock Murders by Kieran James (2021) is set in Greenock, especially the Cartsdyke area of town around Grosvenor Road, and the pubs of Gourock including the Kempock bar and Monteith's (now closed).

=== Media ===
The town has a daily evening newspaper, The Greenock Telegraph, dating from 1857.

Local news and television programmes are provided by BBC Scotland and STV Central. Television signals are received from the Black Hill TV transmitter or one of the local relay transmitters (Rosneath and Ravenscraig). An internet-based TV station – Inverclyde TV – is run by Creative Industries students at Greenock's West College Scotland.

Inverclyde FM on line is a community Internet radio station run by volunteers.

The town is also served by nation-wide radio stations, BBC Radio Scotland, Clyde 1, Greatest Hits Radio Glasgow & The West, Heart Scotland, and Capital Scotland.

=== Notable people ===
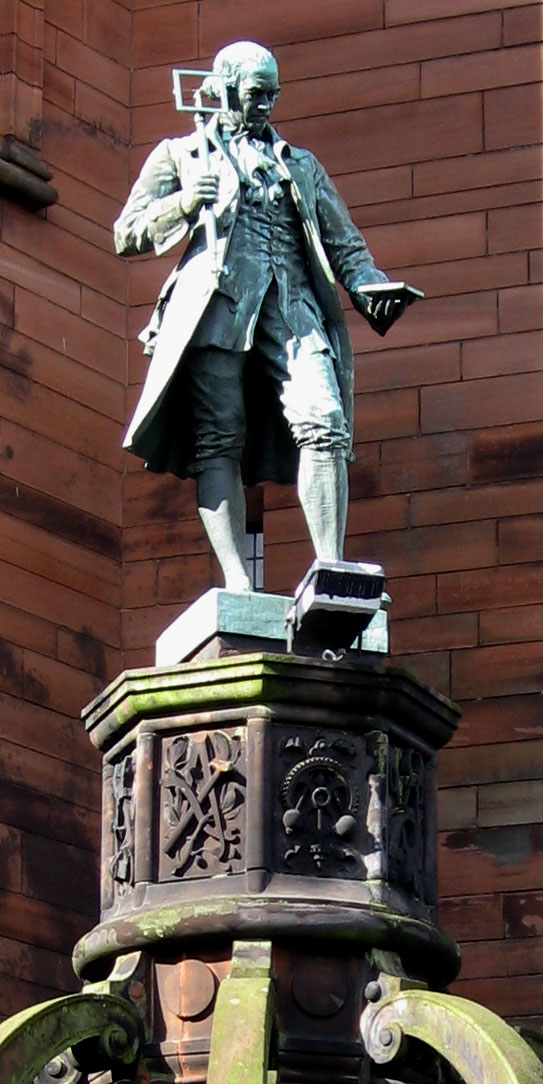
James Watt's statue of 1908 by Henry Charles Fehr at the original James Watt College building, which marks the site of his birthplace.

The most famous Greenockian is the engineer James Watt. He is remembered in several placenames in the town, in the library instituted in his memory, and by the original Watt Memorial School (later College) building on the site of his birthplace in William Street, which incorporates a commemorative statue. The Finnart Campus of the local college was until 2014 known as the James Watt College. Wetherspoons opened the James Watt pub after the building was converted from its previous use as the General Post Office.

The Lady Octavia park and sports centre are named after Lady Octavia Grosvenor, wife of the local MP Sir Michael Shaw-Stewart, who died in 1921.

John Cummings, born in Greenock in 1944, was a Scottish footballer, who played for six teams over ten years in both the United Kingdom and United States.

John McGeoch, one of the most influential rock guitarists of the last decades, was born in Greenock in 1955; he spent his childhood with his family in the city before moving in his teens. Mojo magazine listed McGeoch as one of the "100 Greatest Guitarists of All Time".

Other Greenockians include the composers Hamish MacCunn and William Wallace, violinist Henri Temianka, mathematician William Spence, poets Denis Devlin, W. S. Graham and Jean Adam, merchant Matthew Algie, actors Richard Wilson, David Ashton, Martin Compston and Stella Gonet, artists William Scott and Alison Watt, playwrights Bill Bryden, Neil Paterson and Peter McDougall, comedian Charles 'Chic' Murray, opera singer Hugh Enes Blackmore, broadcaster Jimmy Mack, American football player Lawrence Tynes, Antarctic explorer Henry Robertson 'Birdie' Bowers and portrait painter Leonard Boden.

- Charles McQueen (1836–1906), engineer and gold-dredger.
- John Davidson (1857-1909), dramatist and poet, lived and worked at Greenock from 1862 to 1889.
- Donald McIntyre (1891–1954) was born and raised in Greenock.
- The novelist and children's writer Mary Alice Faid was born in Greenock in 1897.
- Alan Sharp (1934 - 2013), the novelist and screenwriter, was brought up in Greenock and set part of his novel A Green Tree in Gedde (1965) in the town.
- Robert Wilson, the grandfather of Uncle Sam (Samuel Wilson) was born in Greenock.
- Stephen Purdon (born 1983), an actor who appeared on River City, was born in Greenock.
- Rosé, a contestant on RuPaul's Drag Race, was born in Greenock.
- Angela Egan, The 2021 winner of Dancing on Ice was born in Greenock, and after learning to skate in Paisley, became one of the first coaches at Greenock's Waterfront Ice Rink when it opened.
- M.R.D. Meek, mystery novelist, was from Greenock
- Ken MacLeod, science fiction novelist, was educated at Greenock High School.

=== People with other connections ===
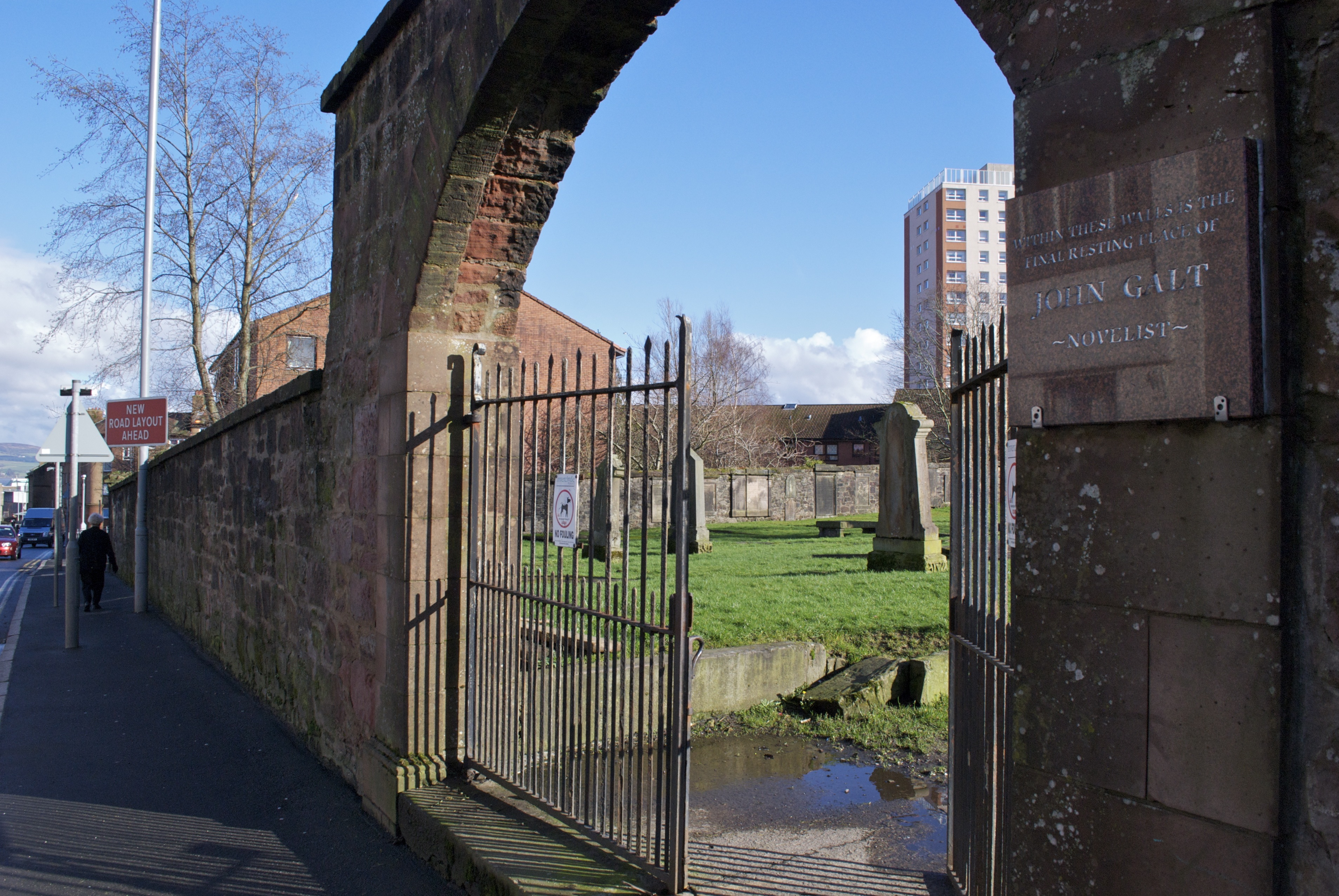
Cemetery entrance from Inverkip Street, with plaque commemorating John Galt.

Pirate William Kidd claimed on death row that he was born in Greenock, but subsequent evidence has shown that he was born either in Belfast or Dundee.

Robert Burns' lover Mary Campbell (Highland Mary) and her father sailed from Campbeltown to visit her brother in Greenock early in October 1786. Her brother fell ill with typhus, which she caught while nursing him. She died of typhus on 20 or 21 October 1786, and was buried in the Old West Kirk graveyard. In 1842 increasing interest in their romance led to a monument being erected by public subscription to mark the grave. In 1920 when the church site was needed to expand Harland and Wolff's shipyard, the monument was moved to its present site in Greenock Cemetery, with her remains being transferred to a casket and re-interred with due ceremony. The church itself was moved and rebuilt in its current location at the west end of the Esplanade in 1926.

The novelist John Galt, who founded Guelph, Ontario in 1827, lived in the town and based some of his work, most notably Annals of the Parish (1821), on Greenock and surrounding towns. He is buried in the Inverkip Street Cemetery. The mother of American comedian and writer Jay Leno, Catherine Muir, was born in Greenock and emigrated to the US as a child. The American actress Julianne Moore is the daughter of the late Anne Love, a former psychiatric social worker who emigrated from Greenock. The Rev William C. Hewitt (minister at Westburn Parish Church in Greenock), Moderator of the General Assembly of the Church of Scotland in 2009–2010, is the first serving minister at a church in Greenock to be appointed. Reverend Elizabeth Kinniburgh, born in Greencock in 1929, was one of the first women to become ordained as a minister for the Church of Scotland in 1970.

Abdelbaset al-Megrahi, the Libyan intelligence officer convicted of the Lockerbie Bombing, was incarcerated at Greenock Prison from 2005 until his release on 20 August 2009.

== Sports ==
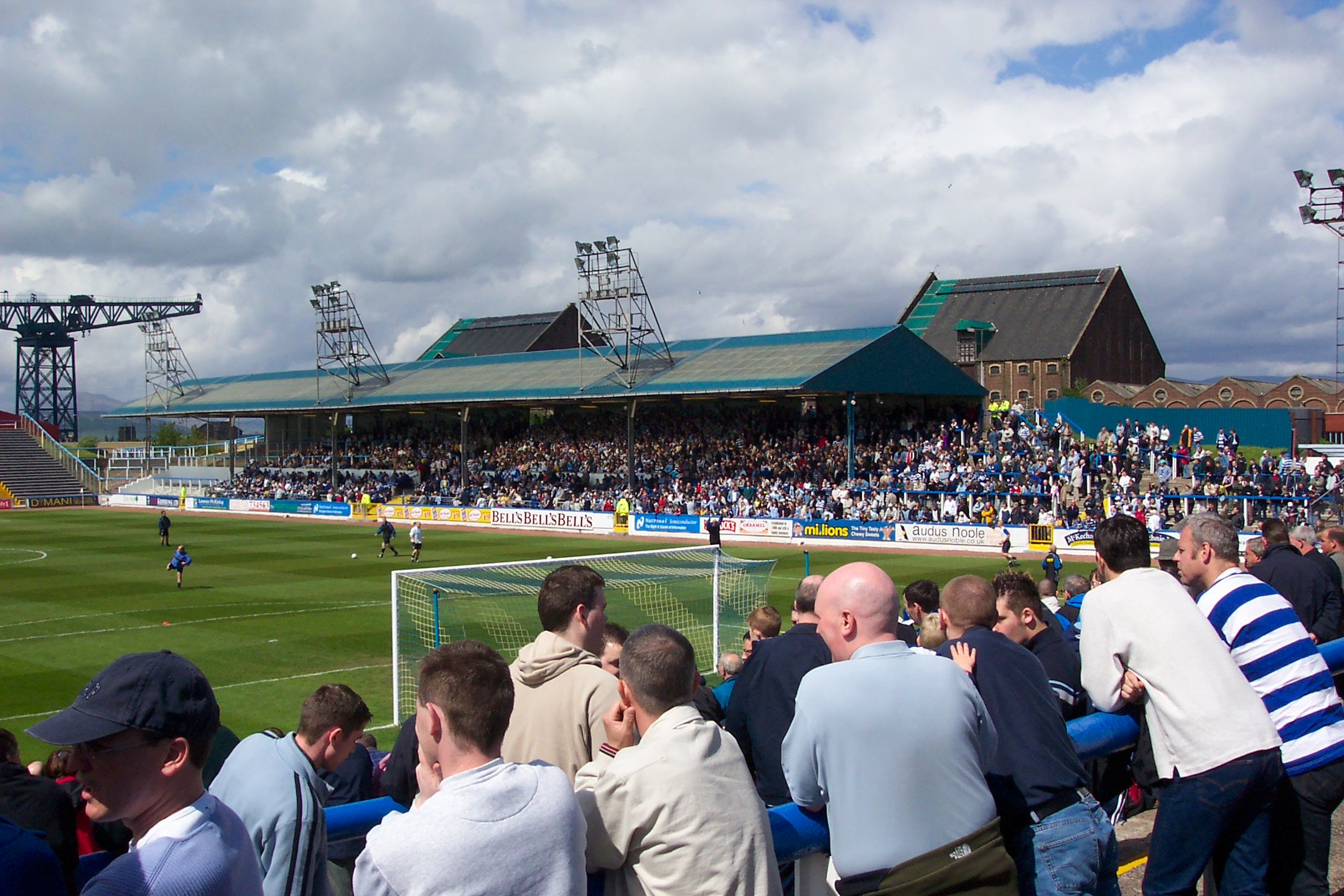
Cappielow Park, home of Morton F.C.

Greenock Morton are the local senior football team who currently play in the Scottish Championship. Founded in 1874 as Morton F.C., they play their home matches at Cappielow. At lower levels of the game, Greenock Juniors F.C. play in the West of Scotland Football League.

Greenock hosts a rugby union team, Greenock Wanderers RFC, founded in 1873. It is one of the oldest clubs in Scotland.

Greenock also has 2 successful athletics clubs, Inverclyde AC and Glenpark Harriers

It is also the hometown of the Greenock Cricket Club and Greenock Golf Club.

In 1972, the town was also the host of the first official international women's football match played in Britain. The game, between Scotland and England, resulted in a 3-2 win for England.

Leisure facilities in Greenock are primarily provided by Inverclyde Leisure. There are several sports facilities in the town and surrounding area managed by Inverclyde Leisure:

- Waterfront Leisure Complex
- Greenock Sports Centre
- Lady Octavia Sports Centre
- Boglestone Community Centre and Fitness Gym
- Ravenscraig Sports Centre
- Battery Park Pavilion
- Gourock Fitness Gym
- Gourock Outdoor Swimming Pool
- Birkmyre Park Fitness Gym (Kilmacolm)

In 2009, plans were proposed to build a new multi-purpose facility at Rankin Park. In 2021, more plans were proposed that would build indoor tennis courts, along with other facilities. However, due to rising costs, it is uncertain whether it will go ahead, or be scrapped.
