= PS Iona =

PS Iona is the name of the following ships, named for the Scottish island of Iona:

- PS Iona (1855), a Scottish-build paddle steamer used by the Confederacy as a blockade runner, sank after a collision in 1862
- PS Iona (1864), operated on the Firth of Clyde from 1864–1936

== See also ==
- Iona (disambiguation)
