= Lyle Hill =

Greenock, Inverclyde, Scotland

Coordinates: 55°57′20″N 4°47′36″W

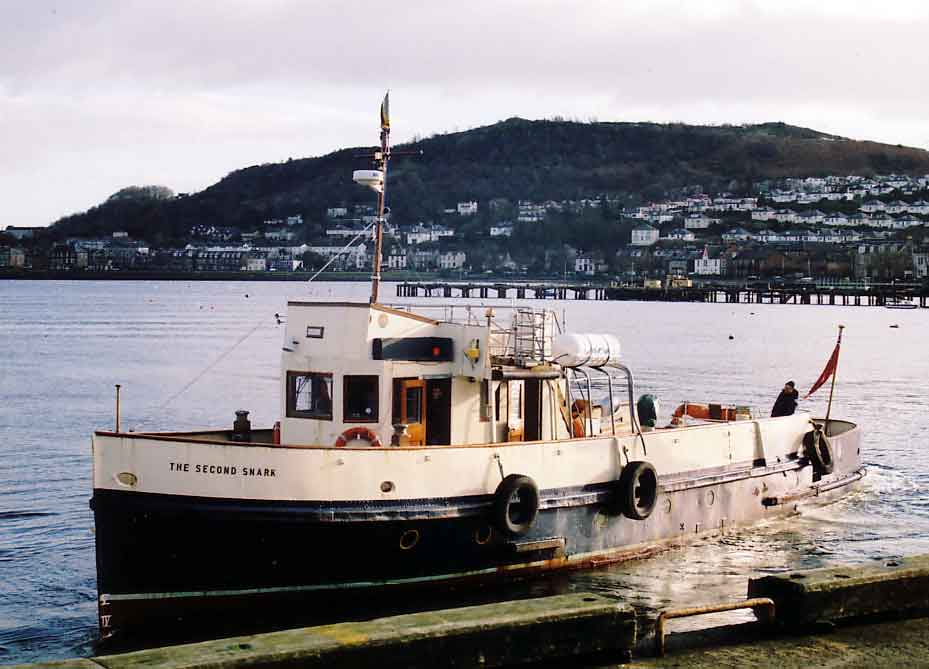
Profile of the Lyle Hill seen from Gourock Pierhead

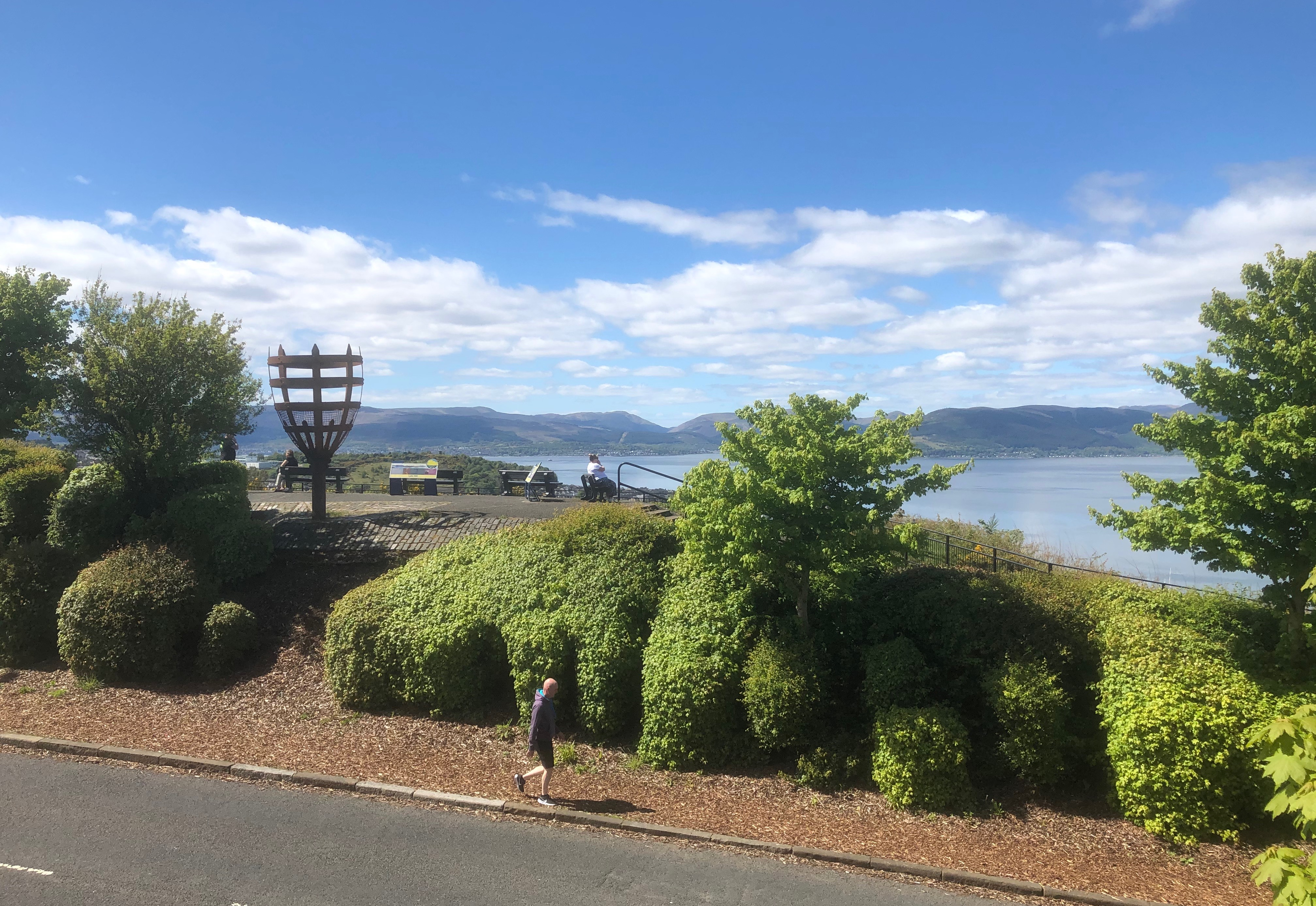
View across Lyle Road to the Lyle Hill scenic viewpoint and beacon

Lyle Hill stands at the West End of Greenock in Inverclyde, Scotland. It has scenic viewpoints accessible from Lyle Road, which was constructed in 1879–1880 and named after Provost Abram Lyle, well known as a sugar refiner. The hill's highest point is Craigs Top at 426 feet (130 m) above sea level, and before the road was constructed the hill was known as the Craigs, or as the Bingens (with various spellings).

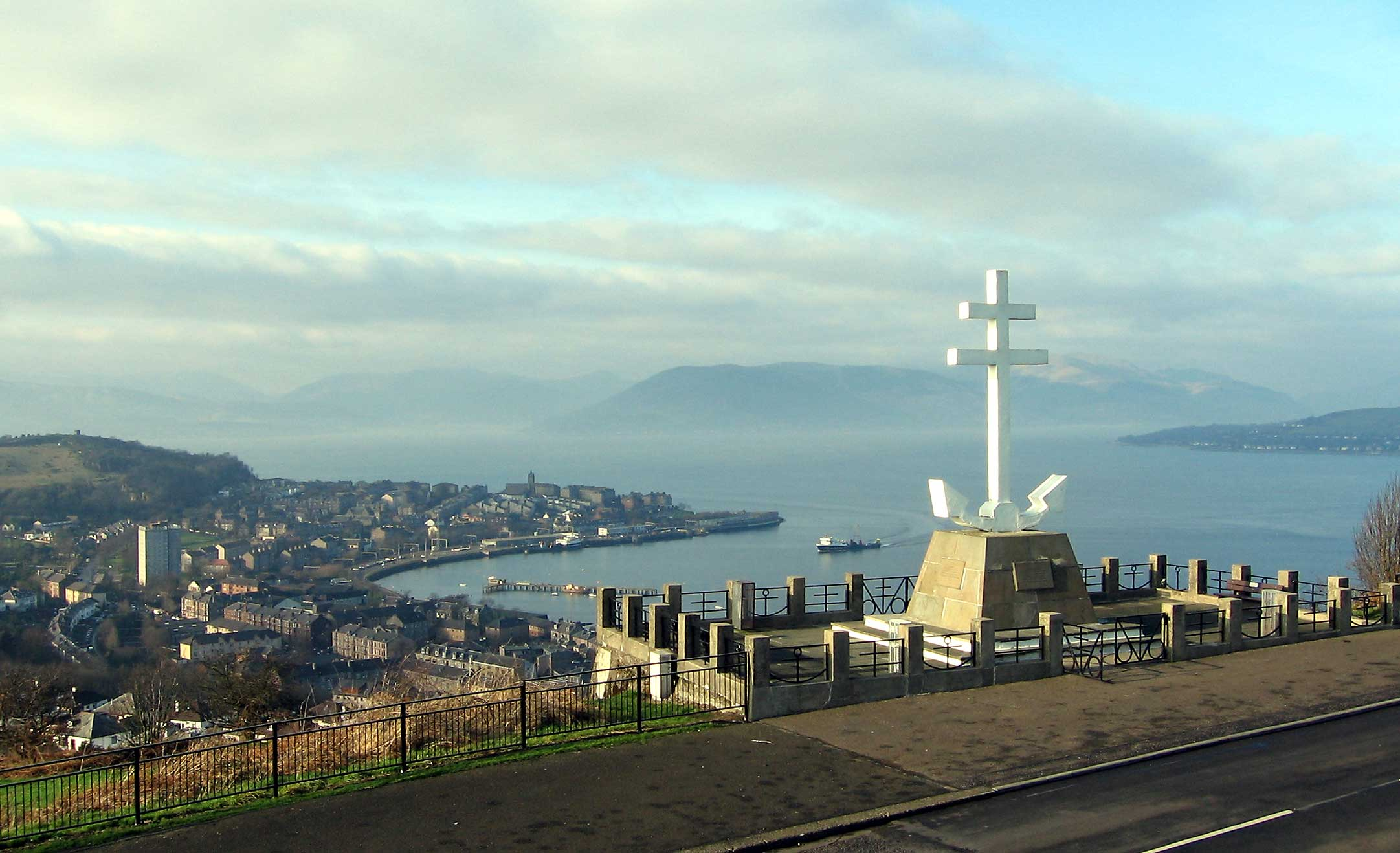
The Free French memorial.

Adjacent to the highest point of the road, a scenic viewpoint looks out over Gourock and the Firth of Clyde to Cowal in the west, and north over the Fort Matilda area of Greenock to Argyll across the Clyde. There are benches, information points, and a beacon which is lit on significant occasions. Car parking spaces give views to the west, and a short distance further down the road the Free French Memorial is in the shape of the Cross of Lorraine combined with an anchor. Across the road, steps and a rough path lead up to a viewpoint at Craigs Top with views up the River Clyde as far as Glasgow.

== History and name ==
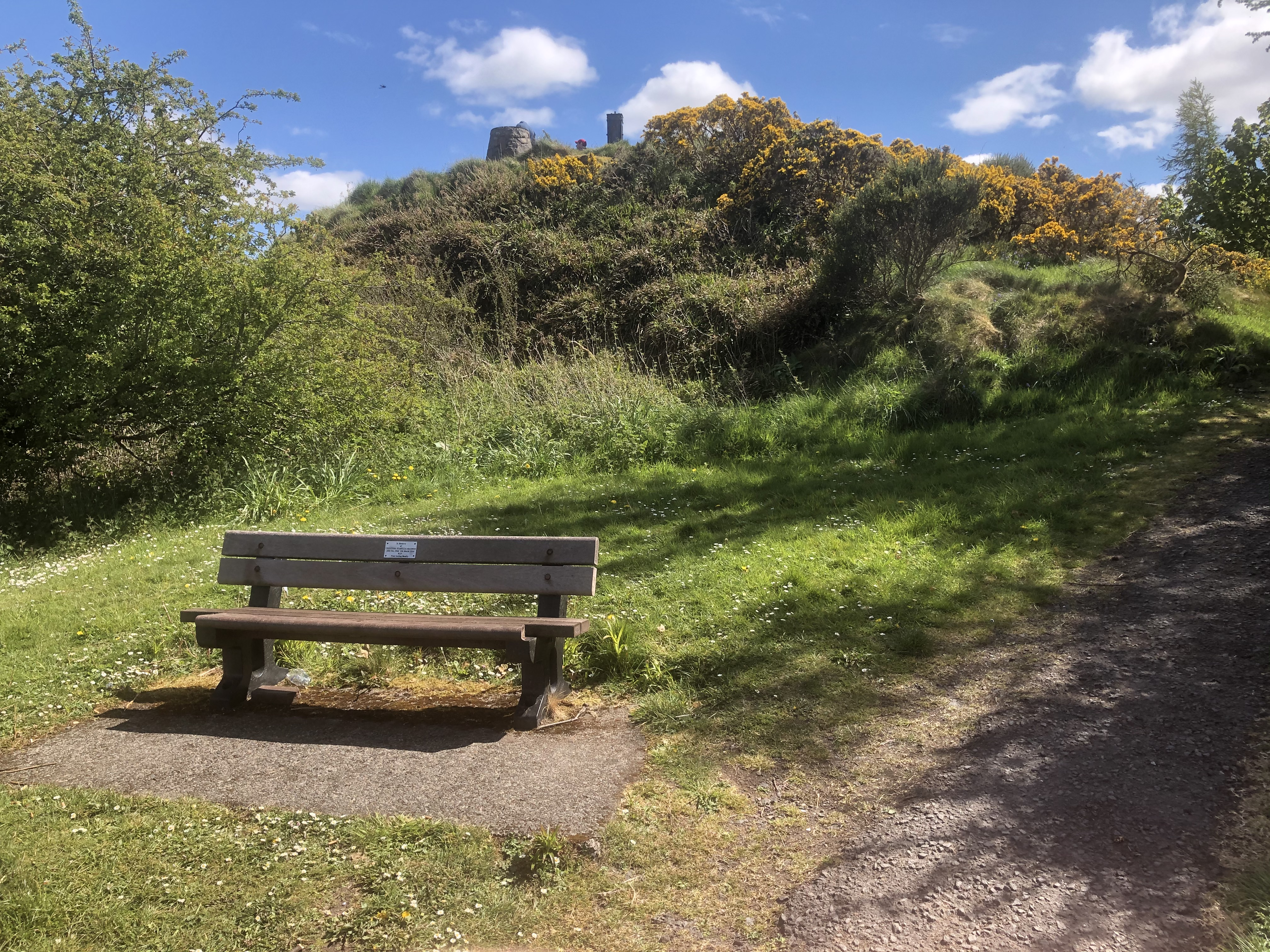
Bench near the summit of Craigs Top

The hill was at one time known as the Craigs or Craigs Top, the Bingens, Mount Binian or Binnan's Hill. Spellings included the Binghans, Bingans, Bingins, Bingens, and Binyans, and it was suggested that this came from the Gaelic Binneans with the meaning of little hills. The Reform Act 1832 plan of Greenock shows Craigs Top, with Craigs Farm House to its east, as does an 1842 map of "Greenock and its environs" though it uses the term Farm Steading. From 1856 onwards, large scale Ordnance Survey maps show Craigs Top, with Craigs farm about 330 yards (300 m) to the east. They also show Bow Hill to the south, but do not give any other name to the northern part of the hill. Admiralty charts from 1850 on show Binian Peak or Mt. Binian, after 1915 they show Craigs Top with Mt. Binian as a supplementary name, after 1932 just Craigs Top.

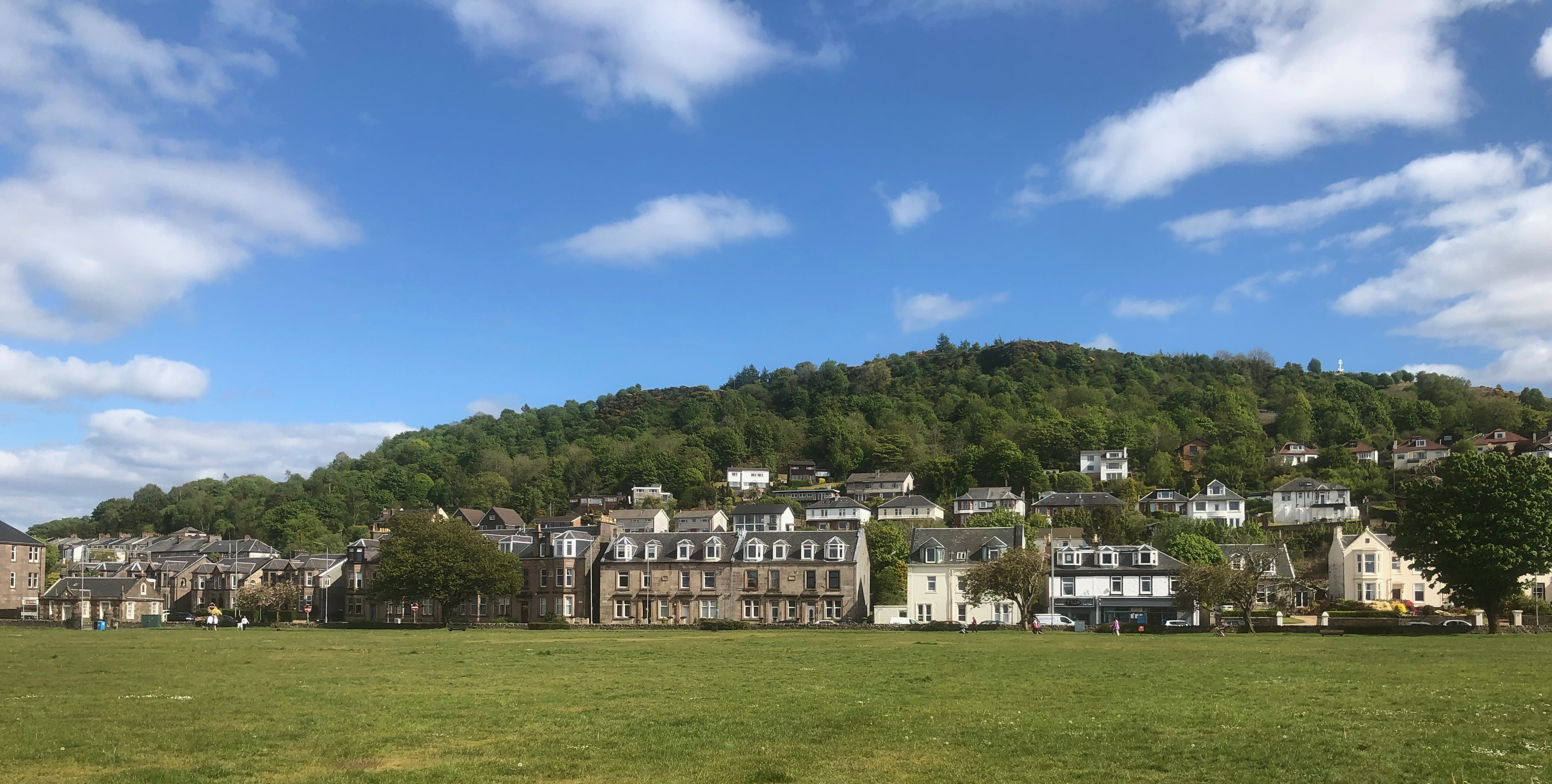
Lyle Hill seen across Eldon Street from Battery Park, Greenock, with the old Toll House to the left

John Thomson's 1832 Atlas of Scotland depicts the mass of the hill. The word Cadelhills, across its southern part, was the name of a house and its garden, now in the grounds of Greenock Crematorium. A study of the early cartography of Renfrewshire states that the name "Lyle's Hill" appears on James Knox's 1836 Map of the Basin of the Clyde, but does not give any detail of the location of this hill. There is a "Lyles Hill" in the Muirsheil area shown on John Ainslie's 1800 map of Renfrewshire to the east of the River Calder, on large scale Ordnance Survey maps it is shown about 0.8 miles (1.3 km) north west of Windy Hill.

John Marius Wilson in his 1860 Hand-Book To Scotland: For Tourists described the "small modern fortification" of Fort Matilda as set "on a point of land projecting from the base of Binnan's Hill", and said that "Binnan's Hill rises behind it with precipitous crest, and commands a fine view of the Clyde from Dumbarton to Dunoon."

=== Lyle Road ===
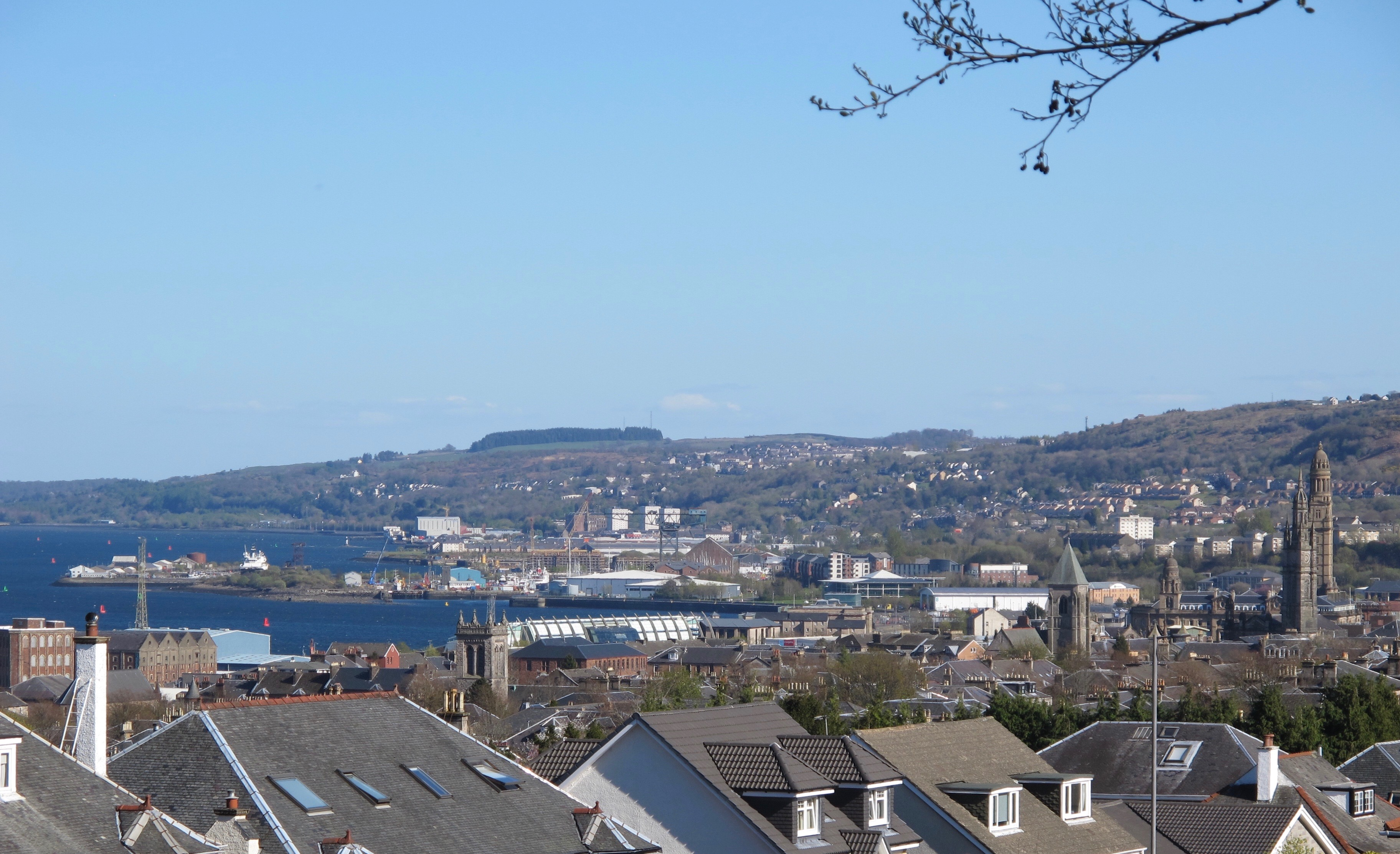
Waterfront and harbours, view east from the start of Lyle Road, with the Glebe Sugar Refinery at far left

Greenock expanded to the west on a grid plan. There was severe unemployment in the town during the Long Depression, and in late 1878 the Police Board resolved to provide work by building a road or carriage drive to the Craigs or Bingens from the west end of Finnart Street, where it meets Madeira Street. The Streets Committee agreed in January 1879 to name it Lyle Road, after Abram Lyle who was then the town's Provost. He inherited a Greenock cooperage business, and in 1865 had co-founded a sugar refining partnership that acquired the Glebe Sugar Refinery (visible from the start of Lyle Road). The number of men and boys employed on the road construction varied from 250 to 400. The completed road extended westwards down to the Gourock toll at the junction of the high and low roads to Gourock, and was formally opened on 1 May 1880.

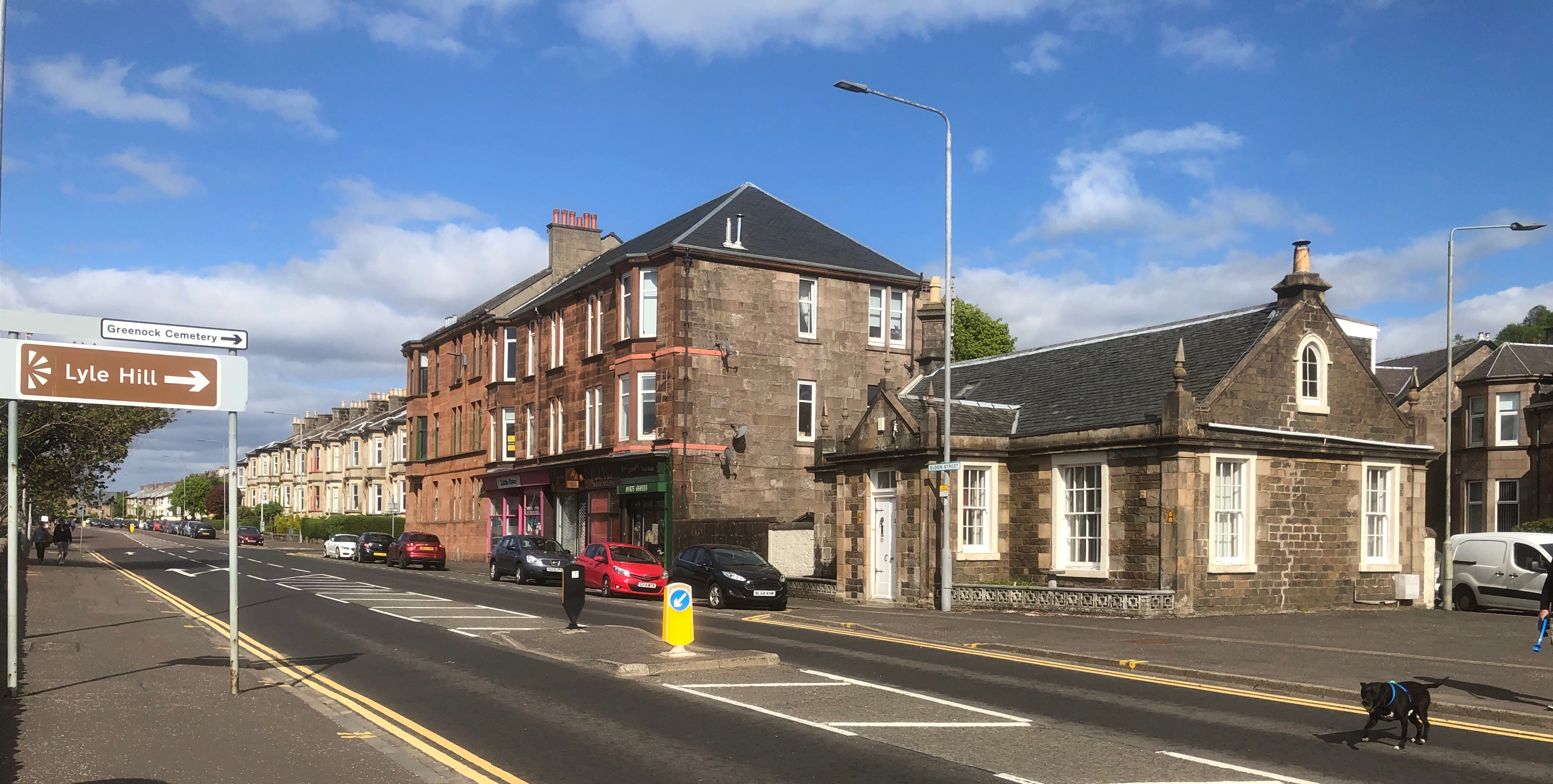
Old Gourock tollhouse, Lyle Hill viewpoint sign for turn into Lyle Road.

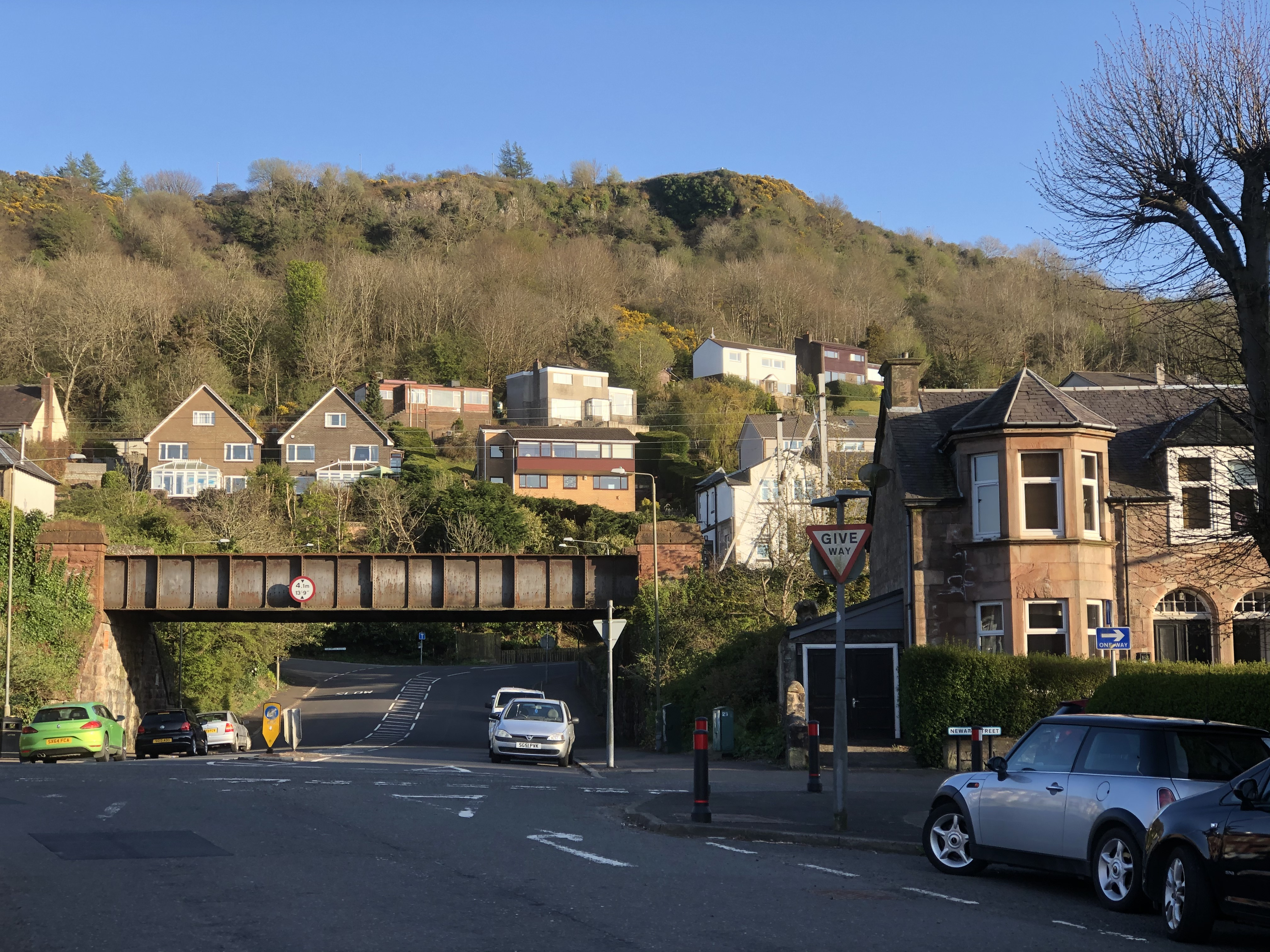
Railway bridge over Lyle Road.

Lyle Road was built to an average gradient of 1 in 10. The maximum gradient is between 1 in 5 and 1 in 7 (14% and 20%), the steepest point being at the 50m contour, just above the hairpin bends at the west side of the road. The distance along it heading west from Madiera Street to the Gourock toll is 1.7 miles (2.7 km). Its high point at 392 feet (119 m) above sea level is near Craigs Top (426 feet (130 m)), which a Canadian wit proposed should be renamed "The Heights of Abram". The Lyle family sold its share in the Glebe refinery to other partners in 1880, and with the funds bought land at Plaistow near London to start the Abram Lyle & Sons refinery, not far from the Silvertown refinery of Henry Tate & Sons. In 1921 their successors merged to form Tate & Lyle.

From 1863 onwards, the Caledonian Railway and the Greenock and Ayrshire Railway sought approval for rival schemes taking various routes for a connection to Gourock. In 1883 the House of Lords committee decided in favour of a Caledonian Railway scheme, and their railway opened in 1889. It runs in a bored tunnel directly under Newton Street, the next street to the south parallel with Finnart Street, diverging where Newton Street bends west into Lyle Road. Houses eventually developed along Newton Street a short distance past this bend: the length of Lyle Road from these houses to the junction with Eldon Street is approximately 1.5 miles (2.4 km). The railway tunnel ends in the Fort Matilda area, and a short distance to the west of Fort Matilda station an iron railway bridge takes the line over Lyle Road, on its way to Gourock station and pierhead.

=== Recreation, wartime and commemoration ===
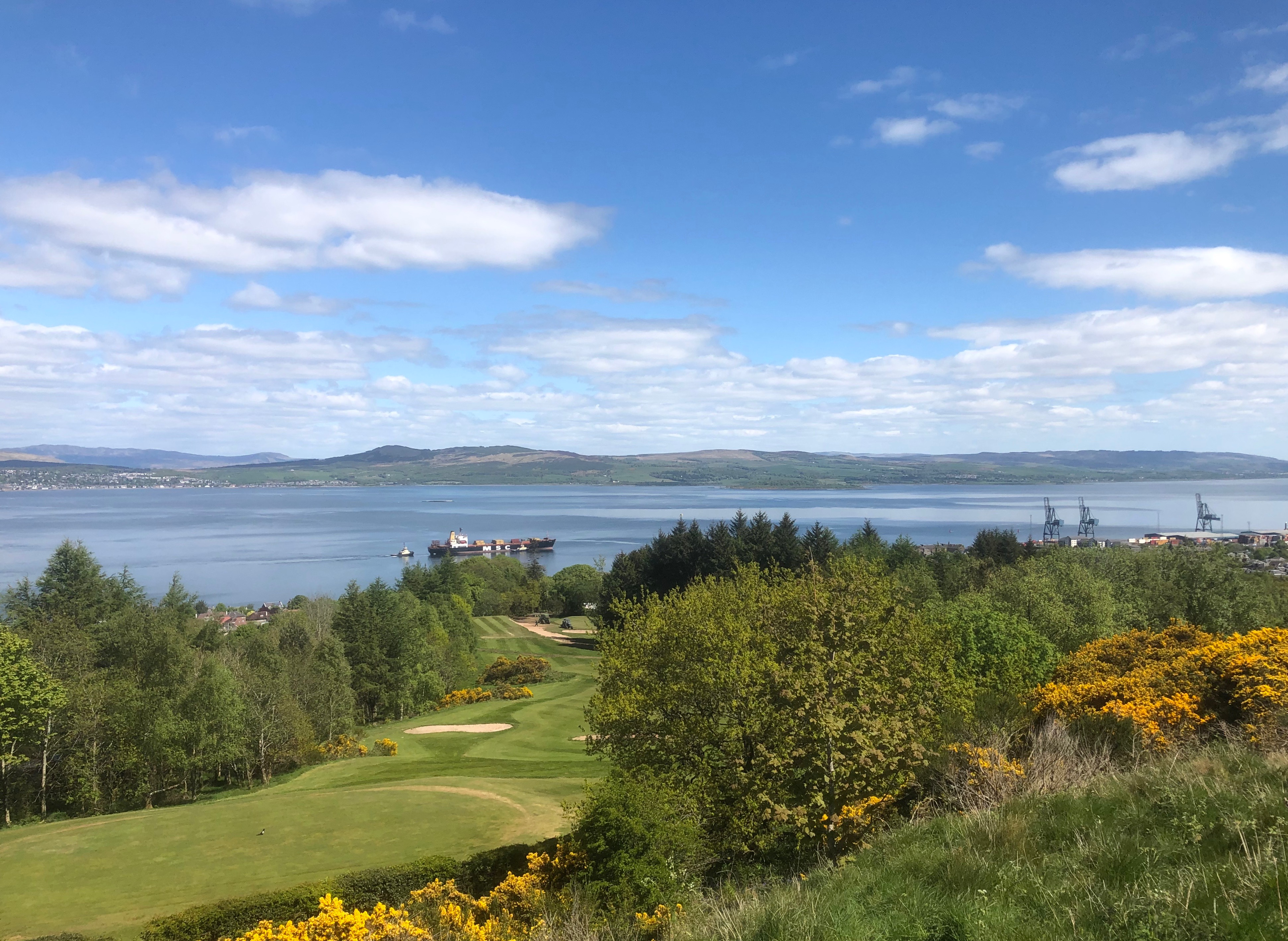
View from Craigs Top over Greenock golf course and container terminal

Two ministers from St Andrews were ordained in 1873 at Greenock churches, the Mid Kirk and the Old West Kirk, and brought their golf clubs. With others, they promptly set up a six hole golf course on land leased from Bow Farm, but this ended after three years when the tenant farmer applied cattle manure. In 1890 Greenock Golf Club was founded with a nine hole course on the Battery Park, then in 1892 the Club leased ground to the south of Lyle Road, and built a clubhouse at the south end of Forsyth Street. Initially they had a nine hole course, over time this was extended and an eighteen hole course added.

In his 1903 guidebook, M. J. B. Baddeley described Lyle Road as the "most remunerative route" between Greenock (Princes Pier) and Gourock, over a good road that passes by Sir Gabriel Wood's Mariners' Asylum. "The view across the Clyde from the highest point ('Lyle Hill') is very fine", and a "zigzag road leads down into the main road to Gourock again." In 1929 local Co-operative Society jubilee celebrations "concluded with a fireworks display on the Lyle Hill".

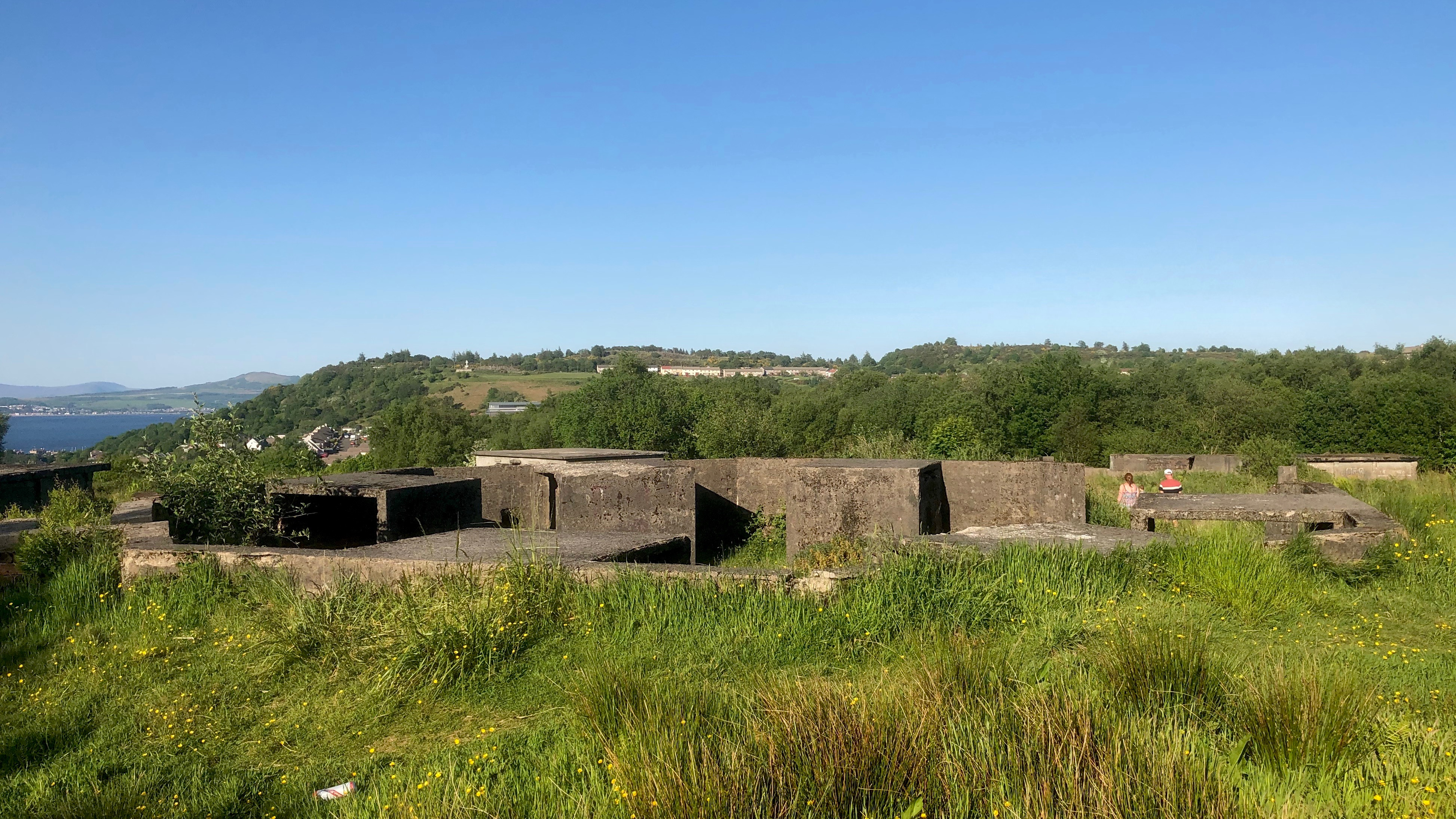
Larkfield HAA anti-aircraft gun battery in Gourock, looking east towards Lyle Hill and Bow Hill

During World War II most of the golf course was occupied by Site Cz4 Z Battery, anti-aircraft rockets defending the area against Luftwaffe raids (such as the Greenock Blitz). Also known as Clyde Aa Defences, Bow Hill, Craig's Top and Lyle Hill, this was one of six such batteries covering the Clyde and Glasgow. Spread across the hill, the battery had four projectile rocket launchers, each of which was set on a circular base and surrounded by four ammunition huts. The site included a GL Mk. II radar unit. Other accommodation huts were located adjacent to Lyle Road, and on the south boundary next to Greenock Cemetery. After the war, the grounds were reinstated, and the golf course reorientated to form its present eighteen hole and nine hole courses.

There was a large Free French Naval Forces base at Greenock during the war, and at its end they designed and built the Free French Memorial which stands beside Lyle Road, funded by subscriptions raised among their personnel. At a ceremony held on 15 January 1946, the memorial was unveiled by A. V. Alexander, First Lord of the Admiralty, in the presence of officers and ratings from both the Royal Navy and the French Forces.

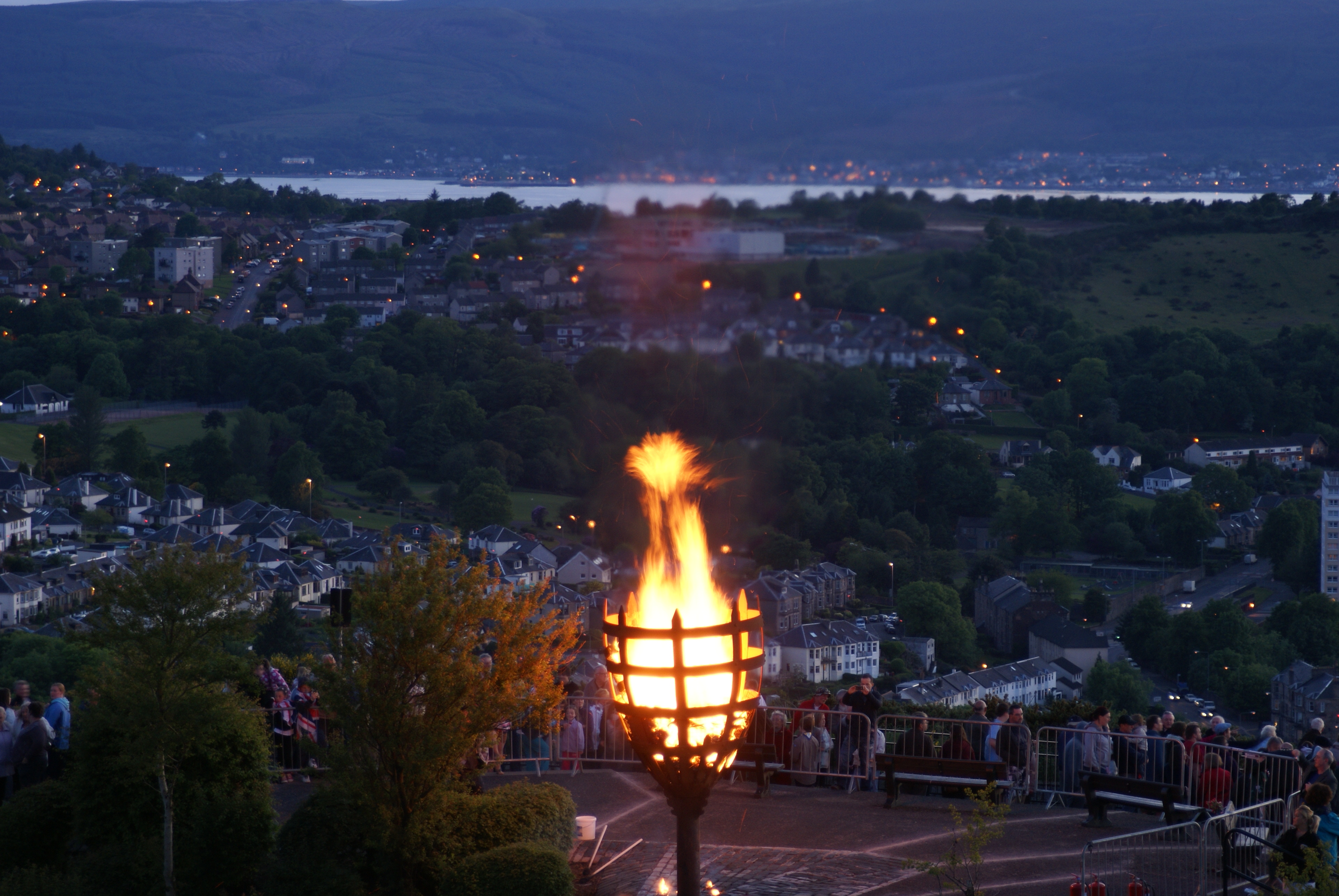
Lyle Hill beacon lit on the occasion of The Queen's Diamond Jubilee, 4 June 2012

To mark the Silver Jubilee of Elizabeth II in 1977, the Lyle Hill beacon was built at the viewpoint beside Lyle Road. This beacon has subsequently been lit for major occasions, including the Queen's Diamond Jubilee in 2012, and her 90th birthday in 2016.

After the Countryside Commission for Scotland offered grant-aid in 1980, lnverclyde District Council carried out major improvements to the Lyle Hill car parking and viewpoint.

Annual Remembrance Sunday commemoration ceremonies take place at the Free French Memorial; in 2016 the occasion also marked 70 years since its unveiling. For the 2018 First World War centenary Remembrance Sunday on Armistice Day, the commemorations at this monument began with a bagpiper at dawn, and in an evening ceremony attended by the French consul a bugler played the Last Post then the Lyle Hill beacon was lit, as were beacons across the United Kingdom.

== Scenic viewpoints ==
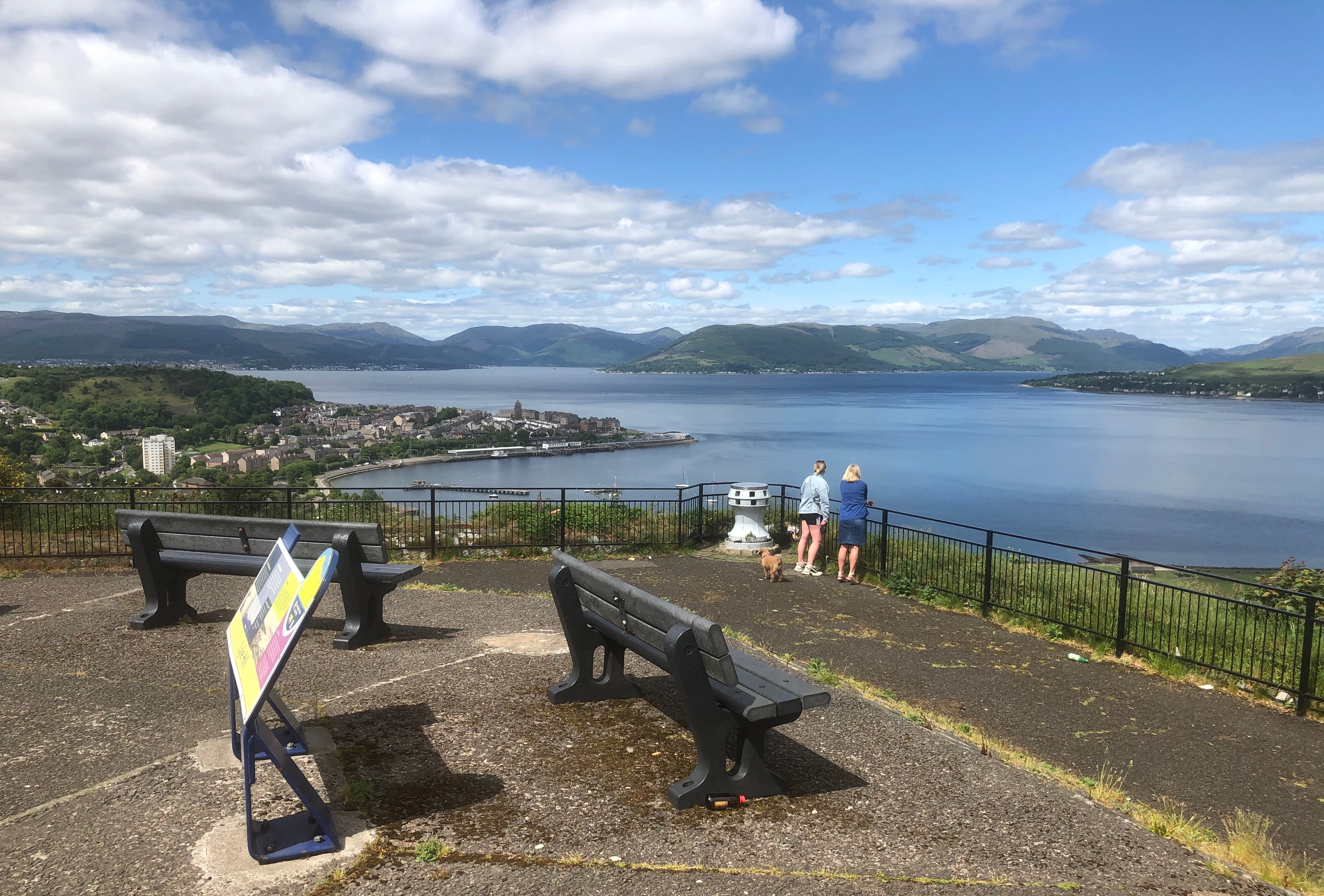
Viewpoint platform, with views over Gourock and the Clyde to Cowal, and toposcope on capstan at corner of footpath above crags

Viewpoints provide panoramic views across the Clyde. The hill overlooks Gourock and the Tail of the Bank, an area of the River Clyde named after the end of the long sandbanks resulting from the river`s journey from the counties of Lanark and Renfrew and denoting the point at which the river becomes the Firth of Clyde. Also visible are the Cowal hills, with the town of Dunoon below, the Holy Loch, former site of the US Navy Scottish submarine base and the settlements of Kilcreggan, Rosneath and Helensburgh to the east. On a clear day it is possible to see beyond the Erskine Bridge to Glasgow in the east, and the Island of Arran and beyond to the south west.

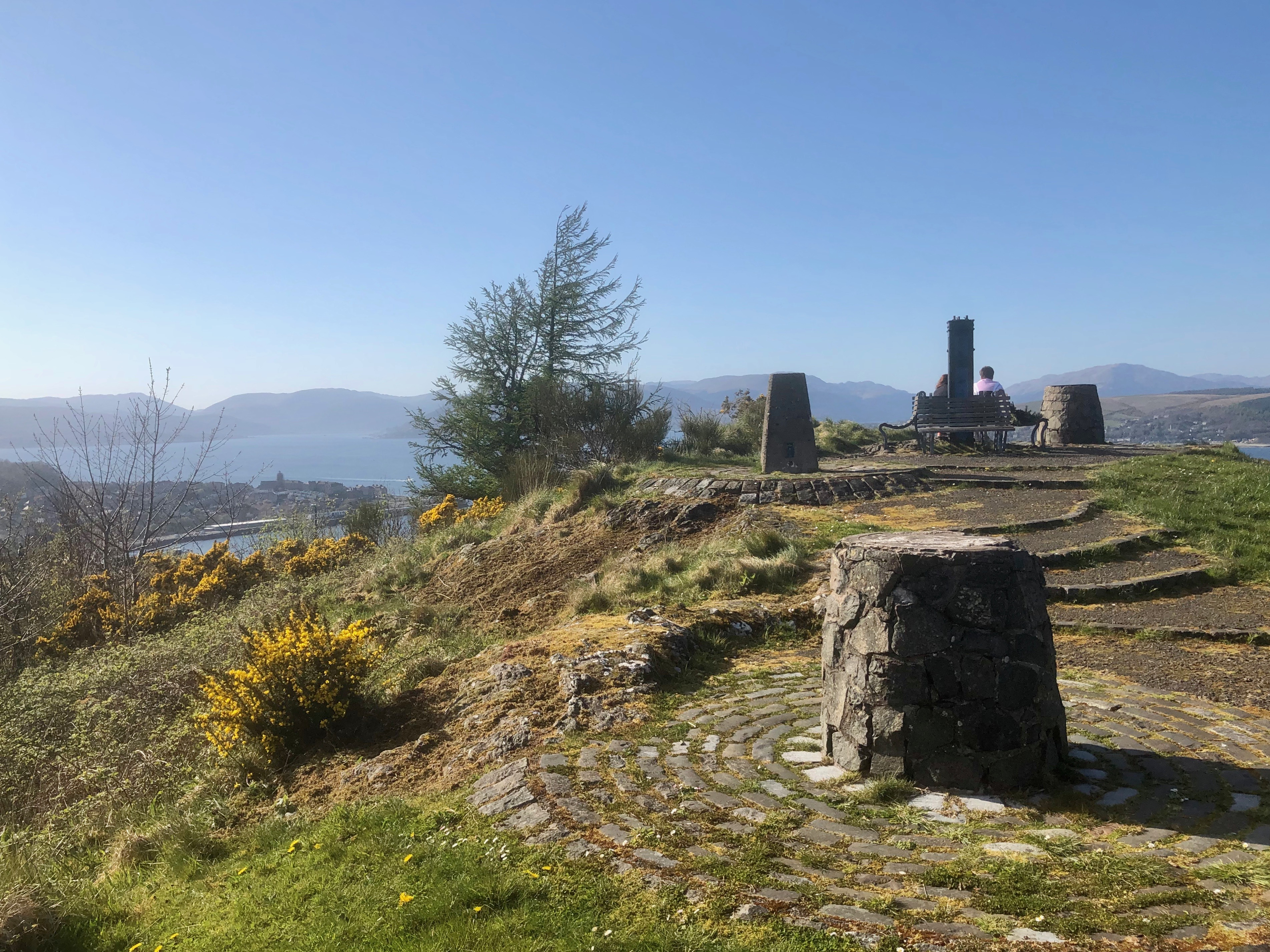
Craigs Top viewpoint, above the road and main viewpoint.

Immediately to the north of the hill Greenock's Battery Park provides level playing fields, bounded on the west by Gourock's Cardwell Bay and on the east by the former torpedo factory, now occupied by warehousing and a housing development, and the Navy Buildings for long occupied by HM Coastguard. They stand at Ironotter Point which in the late 18th century was the site of a coastal gun battery called Fort Matilda, a name now given to the area, to the railway station just to the north of Lyle Hill and to the playing pitch of the local rugby side, the Greenock Wanderers.

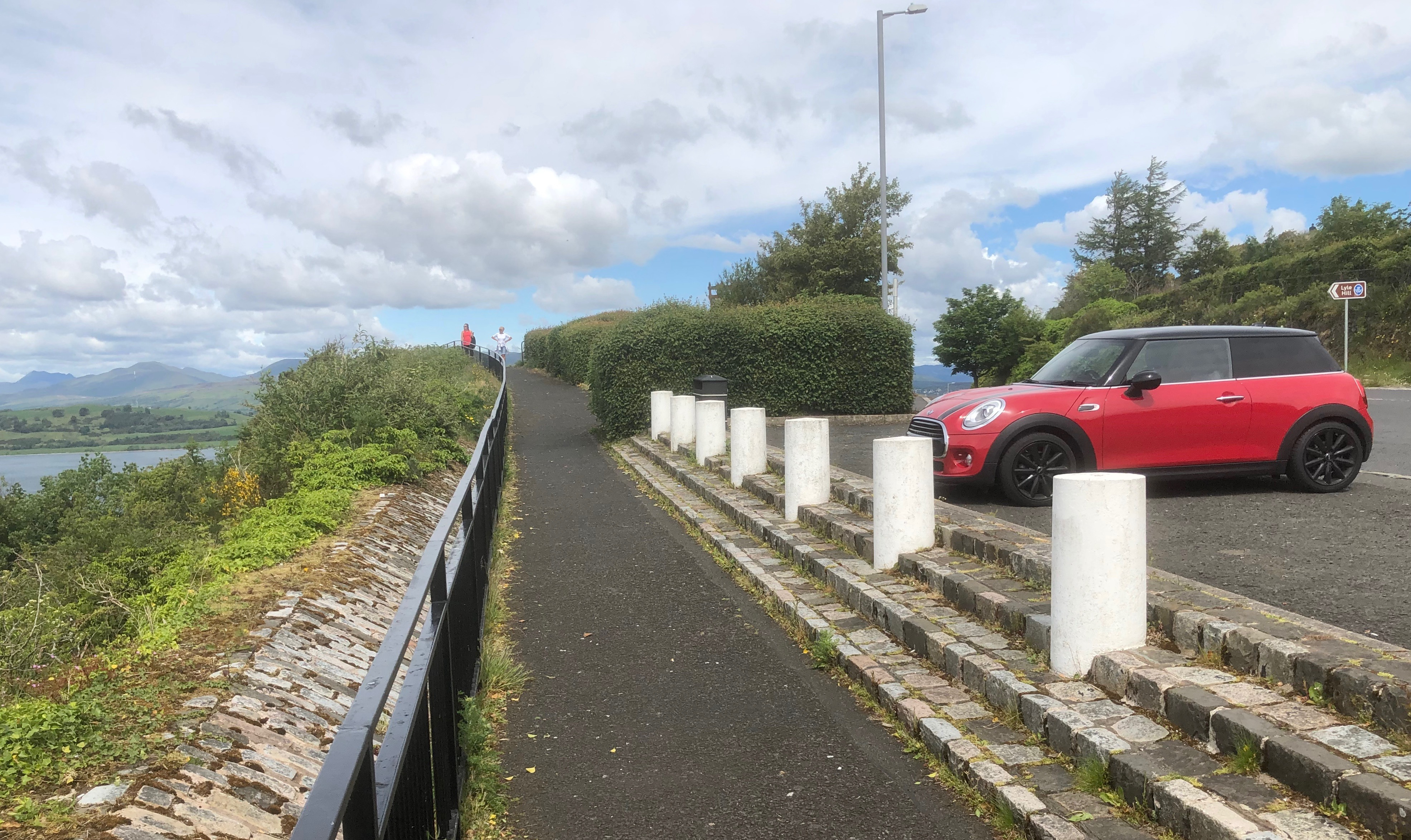
Viewpoint car park, with steps for clear view above footpath railing

The viewpoint is marked by a beacon which was constructed to mark the Silver Jubilee of Queen Elizabeth in 1977 and is lit on special occasions. On the other side of the road, steps and a rough path lead up to Craigs Top, the highest point of the hill. There are steep craigs on the north and west of the hill, formed by glacial erosion, to its south undulating upland forms the site of Greenock golf course. Its high point is at Bow Hill on the west side, and the ground slopes less steeply to the south and east.

A war memorial to the Free French forces who fought in the Second World War stands on the western brow of the hill. The Free French Memorial, Greenock, was built in the shape of the Cross of Lorraine, the emblem of the Free French, combined with an anchor. It has plaques commemorating the loss of the Flower-class corvettes Alyssa and Mimosa, and of the submarine Surcouf. Locally, it is also associated with the memory of the loss of the Maillé Brézé which blew up at the Tail of the Bank.

== See also ==
Media related to Lyle Hill viewpoints at Wikimedia Commons

- Lists of mountains and hills in the British Isles
- List of mountains of the British Isles by height
