= Iona (disambiguation) =

Iona is an island of the Inner Hebrides, Scotland, with particular significance in the history of Christianity in Scotland.

== Derived from the Scottish island of Iona ==
=== Place names ===
==== Australia ====
- Iona, Darlinghurst, a heritage-listed house and former hospital in Sydney, New South Wales
- Iona, Victoria in eastern Victoria
- Iona Gas Plant in Western Victoria near Port Campbell

==== Canada ====
- Iona, Nova Scotia (on Cape Breton Island)
- Iona Island (British Columbia)
- Iona, Newfoundland and Labrador
- Iona Station and Iona in Ontario

==== United States ====
- Iona, Florida
- Iona, Idaho
- Iona, Minnesota
- Iona, New Jersey
- Iona Island (New York)

=== People ===
- Iona (name)

=== Ships ===
- PS Iona (1855) J&G Thomson paddle steamer, sunk off Fort Matilda, 1862
- PS Iona (1864) MacBrayne paddle steamer
- MV Iona 1970 MacBrayne ferry
- MS Iona 2020 P&O Cruises cruise ship

=== Schools ===
- Iona University, a Catholic university located in New Rochelle, New York, USA
  - Iona Gaels, the university's athletic program
- Iona Preparatory School, a Catholic high school located in New Rochelle, New York, USA
- Iona Catholic Secondary School, a member of the Dufferin-Peel Catholic District School Board, located in Mississauga, Ontario, Canada
- Iona College (Windsor, Ontario), a affiliated college of the University of Windsor in Windsor, Ontario, Canada founded by the United Church of Canada
- Iona Presentation College, Perth, a Catholic high school located in Perth, Western Australia
- Iona College (Queensland), a Catholic school located in Brisbane, Queensland, Australia
- Iona College, Havelock North, a Presbyterian girls' school in Havelock North, Hawke's Bay, New Zealand

=== Other uses ===
- The Iona Community, an ecumenical Christian community based on the island and in Glasgow
- Iona National Airways, the first commercial airline in Ireland
- Iona (band), a progressive rock band from the UK
  - Iona (album), their first album
- "Iona", a single from Joy (album), by Scottish band the Skids and Mike Oldfield
- Iona Church, Port Chalmers, a Presbyterian church in Port Chalmers, Dunedin, New Zealand
- Iona (film), a 2015 film starring Ruth Negga

== Of separate origin ==
- Hurricane Iona, a tropical cyclone in the 2025 Pacific hurricane season
- Iona (spider), a genus of jumping spiders

=== Place names ===
==== Angola ====
- Iona National Park in the Namibe province
- Iona, Namibe, a commune in the Namibe province

==== United States ====
- Iona, South Dakota

== Acronyms ==
- IONA, an acronym for Islands of the North Atlantic, an alternative term for the British Isles
- IONA Technologies PLC, a software company with headquarters in Dublin, Ireland

== Fictional characters ==
- Iona, Shield of Emeria, a legendary angel from Zendikar, a Magic: The Gathering expansion set
- Iona, a Fog Mental Model from Arpeggio of Blue Steel
- Hikawa Iona (Cure Fortune), character of HappinessCharge PreCure!
- Iona MacLean, TV character from Monarch of the Glen
- Iona Payne, TV character from Forever

== See also ==
- Jona (disambiguation)
- Yona (disambiguation)
