= Royal Naval Torpedo Factory =

Royal Navy Torpedo Factory may refer to:

- Royal Naval Torpedo Factory, Alexandria, West Dunbartonshire, Scotland
- Royal Naval Torpedo Factory, Greenock, at Fort Matilda, Inverclyde, Scotland
- Royal Naval Torpedo Factory, Antrim, County Antrim, Northern Ireland
