= George B. Goldschmidt =

New York lawyer and Civil War veteran who died in the Sinking of the Titanic

Major George B. Goldschmidt
- Born: December 16, 1840; Manhattan, New York City, U.S.
- Died: April 15, 1912 (aged 71); North Atlantic Ocean
- Military career
- Allegiance: United States of America
- Branch: Army
- Service years: 1861-1865
- Rank: Major
- Conflicts: Gettysburg campaign

George B. Goldschmidt (December 16, 1840 – April 15, 1912) was a lawyer and Major in the American Civil War who was killed during the Sinking of the Titanic.

== Early life ==
Goldschmidt was born on December 16, 1840, in New York City the son of John Meyer Goldschmidt (1801–1877) and Celestine née Judah (1813–1898). John was born in Hamburg, Germany and Celestine was a New York native. In 1850, the family were living in Manhattan; he lived there until the 1860s.

=== Civil War ===
During the American Civil War, Goldschmidt became a lawyer and later enlisted in the 22nd New York National Guard. He became a corporal and later a sergeant, and served at Harper's Ferry and in the Gettysburg campaign. By 1865, he was a Major in the 55th New York National Guard.

== Post-War ==
After the Civil War, he began to practice law in 1870 and became a well-known conveyancer. He lived with his parents until their deaths and opened a practice with his brother Edward (1855–1936). By 1892, he was a member of the Museums of Art and Natural History and the Union League and became well-liked in Hackensack, New Jersey. On October 19, 1895, Goldschmidt and his brother Samuel Anthony traveled to the German Empire on the ship Ems belonging to the North German Lloyd Line. This trip sparked an interest in traveling the world and Goldschmidt would travel several more times on several ships including: Teutonic, Carmania, Campania, Columbia, and Minnetonka. From 1909 to 1912, he established and funded a chemistry fellowship for Columbia University in honor of his brother Dr. Samuel Goldschmidt who graduated in 1871. In 1912, he traveled to Europe and boarded the Titanic back to the United States because it was managed by his friend Captain Edward Smith.

=== Death ===
Goldschmidt was killed during the sinking of the Titanic aged 71. His $10,000 estate in New York was left to his three brothers in New York, Meyer (1842–1920), Samuel Anthony and Edward.
