= Greenock West =

Coordinates: 55.95392°N 4.77087°W

- Location within Inverclyde
- OS grid reference: NS271769
- Council area: Inverclyde
- Lieutenancy area: Renfrewshire
- Country: Scotland
- Sovereign state: United Kingdom
- Dialling code: 01475
- Police: Scotland
- Fire: Scottish
- Ambulance: Scottish
- UK Parliament: Inverclyde
- Scottish Parliament: Greenock and Inverclyde

Greenock West, also known simply as the West End, is an area of Greenock, Inverclyde, Scotland. The streets are in a grid like layout referred to as blocks as opposed to the irregular street patterns elsewhere in the town.

Union Street is the longest before it cuts off into Newark Street. Greenock Academy was located at the far end of Brisbane Street on Madeira Street in the west end, and numerous churches exist within the west end, such as Ardgowan, St Luke's, Old West Kirk, St John's, St George's North, Finnart St Paul's as well as many smaller independent churches. Also located on Finnart Street is the James Watt College.

Greenock West railway station lies at the border between the west end and the town centre. Fort Matilda railway station is located at the other edge of the West End, at the foot of the Lyle Hill, near where Gourock begins.

In the middle is the famous Tontine Hotel at one end of the green Ardgowan Square with the Ardgowan Bowling Club and two tennis courts and Ardgowan Square Evangelical Church at the other end.

The West End is also host to 'Glenpark': home of the 2002 SNCL champions, Greenock Cricket Club. The ground has been credited as one of the most pleasant to play at in the country, and has a slight slope from the East to West end of the field. The club also operates Junior and Lower-league teams under the Greenock or Glenpark XI name, and has full clubhouse facilities.

As well as the current railway line, a former rail link led towards Princes Pier, now home to the new Ocean Terminal, where large ocean cruisers and container ships are re-supplied.
