= Tail of the Bank =

Anchorage in the Firth of Clyde, Scotland

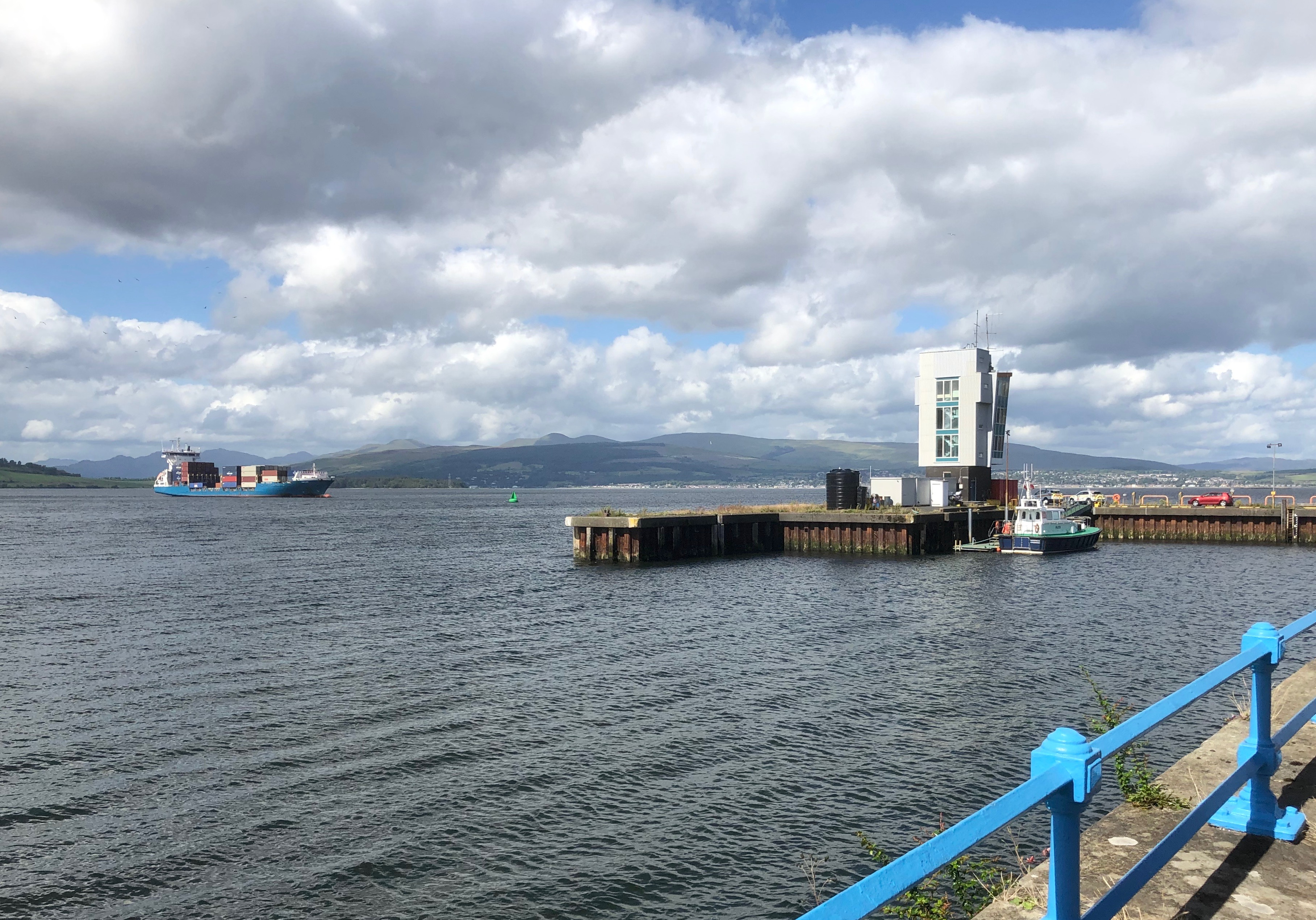
- Tail of the Bank, from Princes Pier

- Location within Argyll and Bute
- Location: Firth of Clyde, Scotland
- Coordinates: 55.97°N 4.753°W

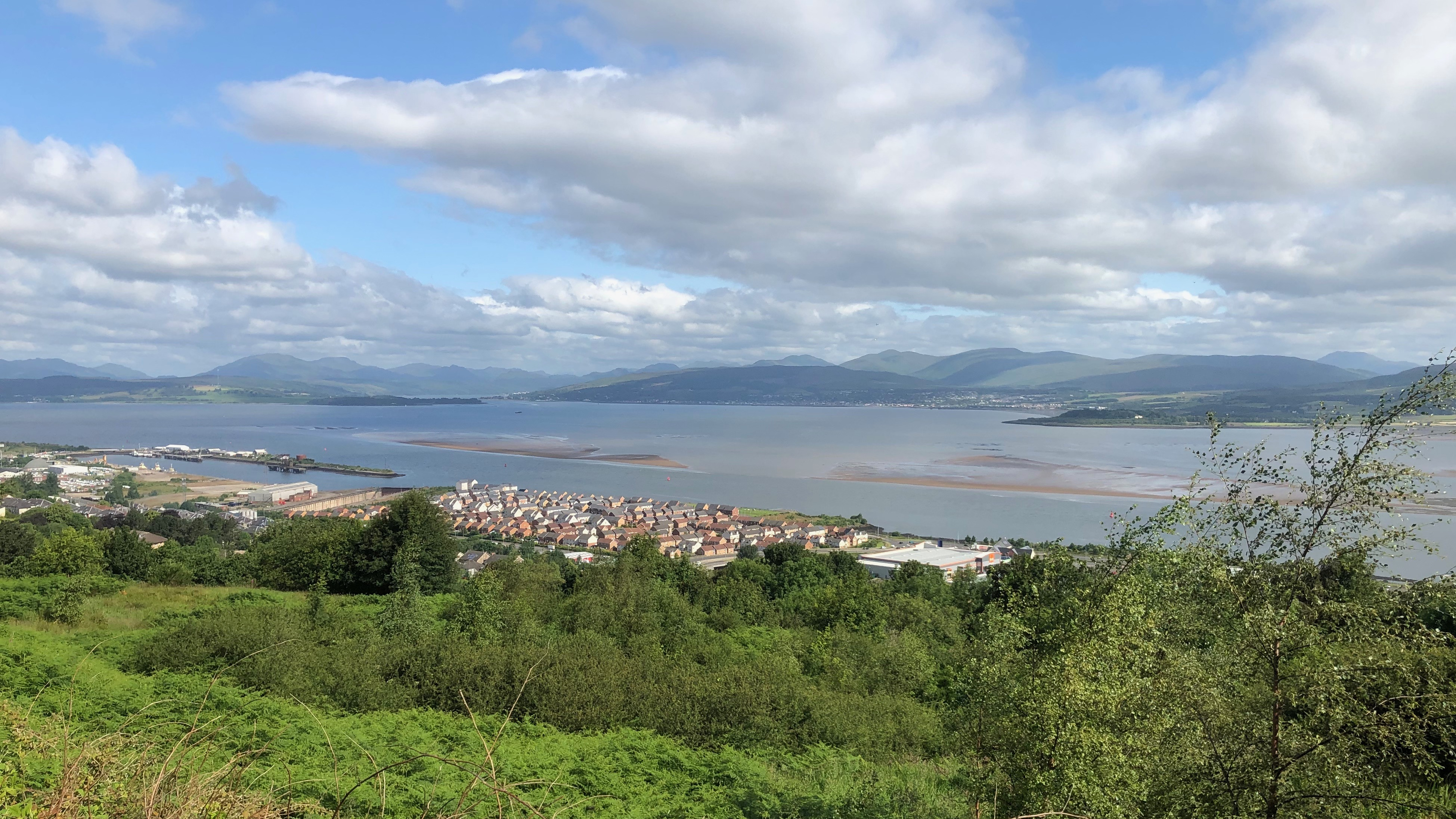
Navigable channel and sandbanks towards the Tail of the Bank and Ardmore Point.

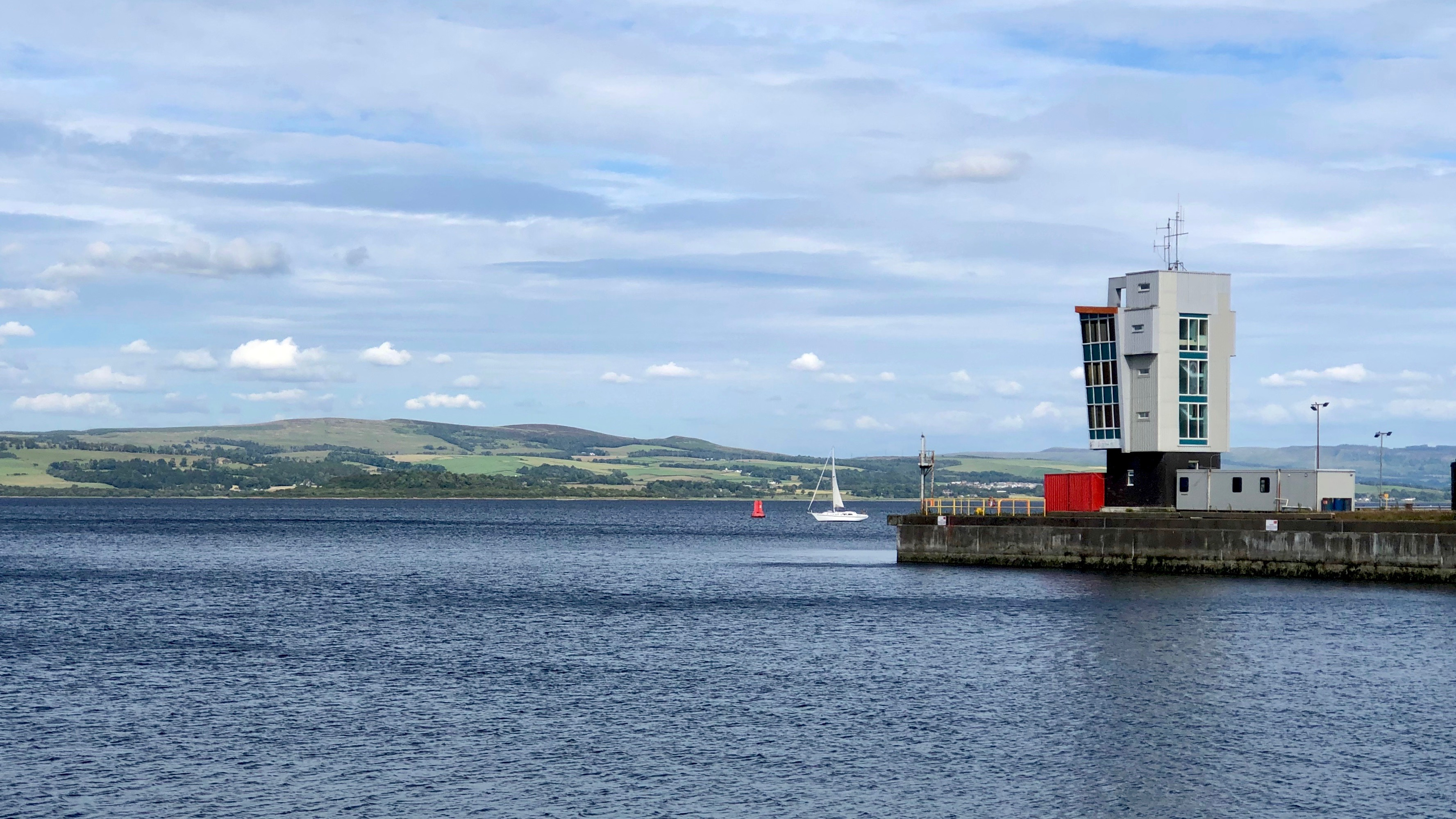
View to Ardmore past the west corner of Princes Pier (Greenock Ocean Terminal), yacht passing red buoy marking Tail of the Bank.

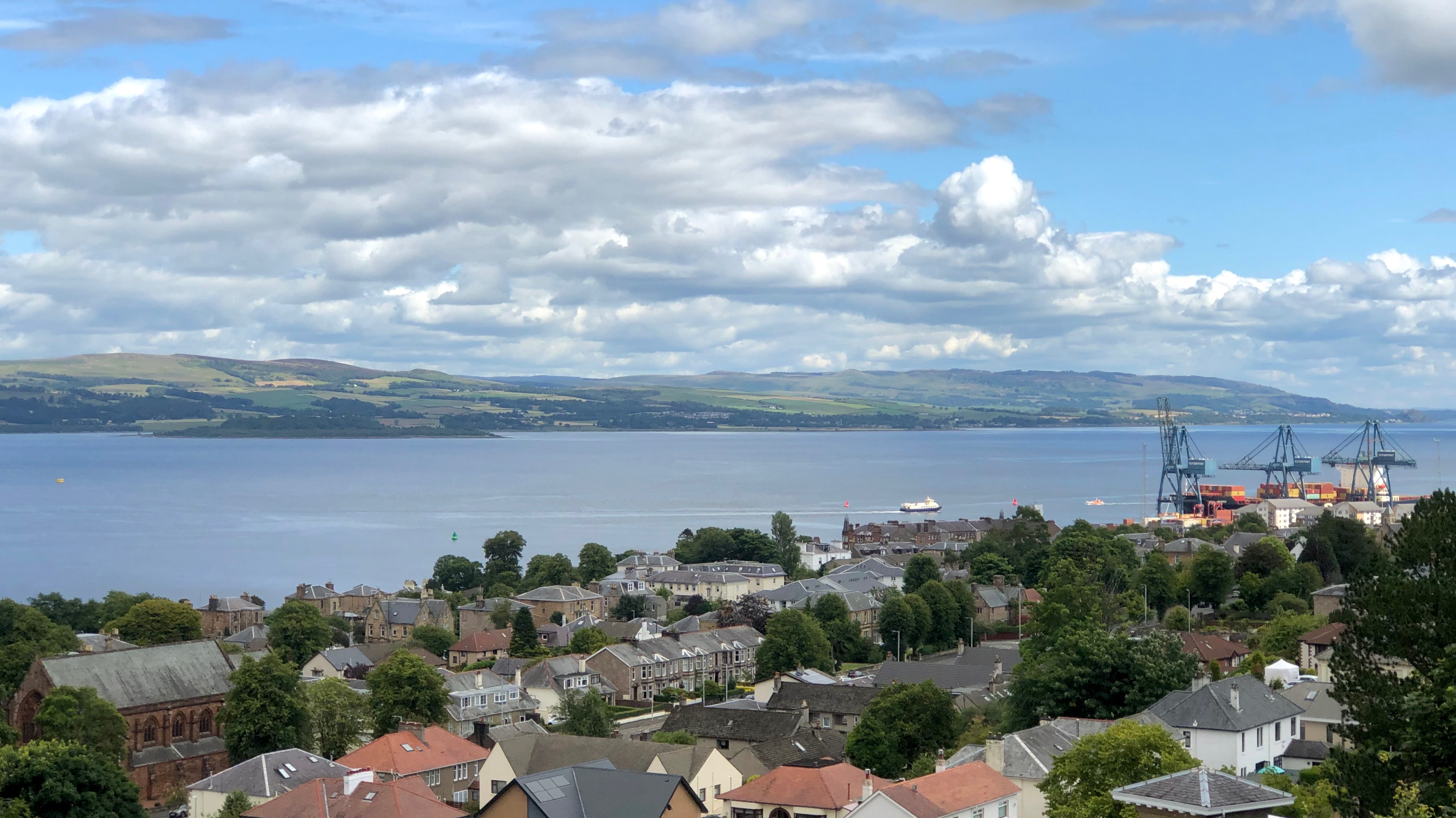
Ardmore across the Clyde, inshore Clyde Clipper enters navigable channel to pass Ocean Terminal container cranes and ship.

The Tail of the Bank is the name given to the anchorage in the upper Firth of Clyde immediately North of Greenock, between Inverclyde and Argyll and Bute. This area of the Firth gets its name from the deep water immediately to the west of the sandbank which marks the entrance to the navigable channel up the Estuary of the River Clyde.

== Location ==
From the Glasgow Green Tidal Weir westwards, the River Clyde is tidal, mixing fresh and salt water. At Milton Island the river was still shallow, then past Dumbarton and the confluence with the River Leven a shoal and sandbank increasingly takes up most of the width of the estuary and extends along the north shore for about 8 kilometres (5.0 mi) to Ardmore. Areas of sandbank dry out at low tide, including the Pillar Bank off Dumbarton and Cardross.

By Port Glasgow the main flow of the river is close to the south shore, with the Cockle Bank to its north, then the Greenock Bank which extends past the waterfront harbours to a point off Greenock Ocean Terminal where the "Tail of the Bank" shelves steeply down to exceed 30 feet (9.1 m) depth. The Shoals at this depth extend northeasterly towards Ardmore, then meet a shallow slope off the northern shore. The 30 feet (9.1 m) depth continues to the northwest, and about midway across the firth between Ocean Terminal and Craigendoran is marked by the wreck of the "sugar boat" Captayannis which lies in that depth about 2.6 kilometres (1.6 mi) north of Greenock Esplanade. To the west of Helensburgh, a deep channel enters the Gare Loch. On its west, the Rosneath peninsula forms the north shore, across the firth from the Fort Matilda suburb of Greenock. Midway between them, the Rosneath Patch reef divides the Clyde into two deep-water channels, and sets the west boundary of the anchorage.

Ships approaching up the Firth of Clyde can take the Ardmore Channel along the south shore of the Rosneath Peninsula, turning north up into the Gare Loch, or the main Firth of Clyde Channel which follows the Greenock shore east-southeast to Greenock Ocean Terminal. The entrance to the dredged channel of the River Clyde is between No. 1 green conical light buoy, off Greenock Esplanade in line with Margaret Street, and No. 2 red can light buoy marking the Tail of the Bank, about 420 metres (1,380 ft) from the corner of Princes Pier. The channel continues about 27 kilometres (17 mi) to the centre of Glasgow.

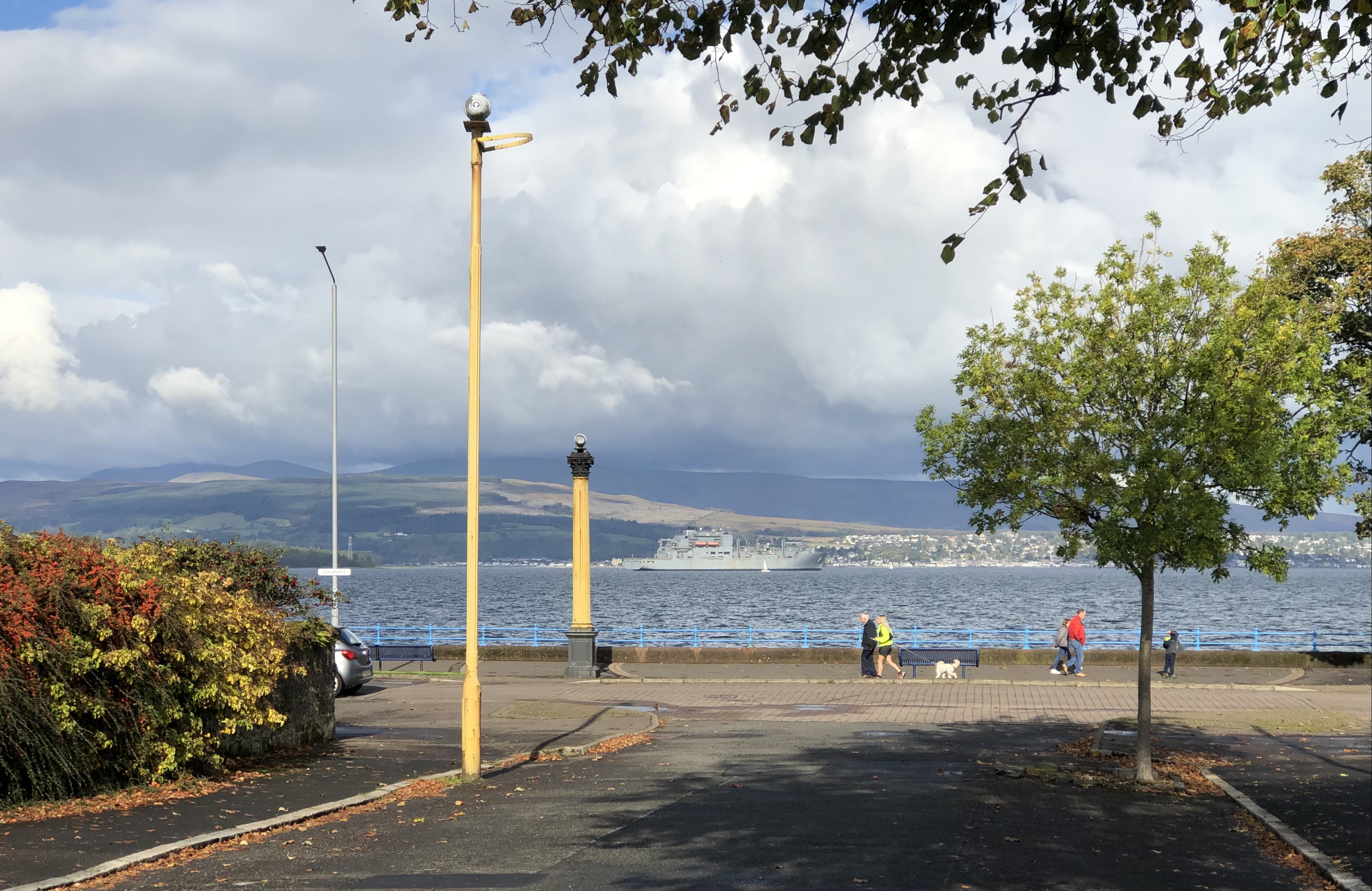
Navigation lights – on a post in Madeira Street and a pillar on the Esplanade. USNS Medgar Evers moored at the Tail of the Bank.

The anchorage depth varies from 60 feet (18 m) to 90 feet (27 m), with the usual anchorage to the east of a line set by two red lights on a pillar and post at the Esplanade end of Madiera Street, Greenock. The line points to The Hole, an area up to 222 feet (68 m) deep to the east of the Rosneath Patch and south of Rosneath Point, a 1925 description says that large ships anchor to the west of the line.

== History ==
In his 1828 description of Greenock, the cartographer John Wood noted: "There is a Sand-bank, which extends from Dumbarton to a short distance to the westward of the Harbour, which narrows the Road for vessels opposite the Town; but at the tail of this bank there is deep water and anchorage for the largest vessels."

The Tail of the Bank was a significant point of embarkation for many travellers, especially emigrants, to Canada and the United States of America. Steamships of the Cunard Line en route from Liverpool to New York City regularly called at Tail of the Bank to pick up additional passengers.

In the past this area was at times crowded with ships, particularly during the Second World War when the Home Fleet warships of the Royal Navy temporarily left Scapa Flow after the sinking of HMS Royal Oak and were based at the Tail of the Bank. The Clyde Anchorages Emergency Port (CAEP) was improvised there in September 1940 by stevedoring companies evacuated from the Royal Docks of London (closed by the first bombing raids on London). Hundreds of merchant ships of the Atlantic convoys gathered there, as well as ships of the Free French Navy. The upper Firth was protected by the Cloch Point To Dunoon Anti-submarine Boom at that time, stretching from Cloch point across the Firth to Dunoon on the Cowal Peninsula. A monument in the form of a Cross of Lorraine combined with an anchor was erected on Lyle Hill overlooking the Tail of the Bank, to commemorate the Free French Naval Forces. It is also associated locally with the Vauquelin class destroyer Maillé Brézé which blew up off Greenock with heavy loss of life on 30 April 1940, before the Free French Naval Forces were established. By 1944 the CAEP became one of the principal destinations for US troops sent to Britain.

In 1974 the "sugar boat" Captayannis was at anchor at the Tail of the Bank when it was driven northwards by a storm and turned on its side on a sandbank midway between Greenock and Helensburgh, forming a large shipwreck which is still visible in the middle of the Firth.

Though the sugar trade has been greatly reduced, Greenock's Ocean Terminal facility now handles container freight and regular cruise-liner traffic. The Royal Navy HMNB Clyde bases on Gare Loch and on Loch Long are linked by this area of the Clyde, and the Greenock Great Harbour is one of the three main ports providing marine services support to the Navy, formerly under the Royal Maritime Auxiliary Service and currently operated by Serco Denholm. "Admiralty boats" are therefore a common sight, occasionally shepherding large Navy ships.
