= Iona Island =

Iona Island may refer to:

- Iona, an island in the Inner Hebrides, Scotland
- Iona Island (British Columbia), formerly an island, now a peninsula physically connected to Sea Island via a causeway and Ferguson Road
- Iona Island (New York), a bedrock island of the Hudson River in the town of Stony Point, about one mile south of the Bear Mountain Bridge, and part of Bear Mountain State Park
- Iona Island (New Zealand), an uninhabited island off Stewart Island

== See also ==
- Iona (disambiguation)
- Iony Island
