= Iona (name) =

Female given name

Iona is a given name that is taken from the Scottish island of Iona, which has a particular significance in the history of Christianity. The derivation of this island name itself is uncertain. The earliest forms of the name enabled toponymist William J. Watson to state that it originally meant something like "yew-place".

The modern English name of the island comes from the Irish Ioua, which was either Adomnán's attempt to make the Gaelic name fit Latin grammar or a genuine derivative from Ivova ("yew place"). Ioua eventually became Iona, first attested from c.1274, and results from a transcription mistake resulting from the similarity of "n" and "u" in Insular Minuscule. Other speculative suggestions have been made for the derivation such as an Old Norse origin from Hiōe meaning "island of the den of the brown bear".

Iona is also an alternative form of the male name Jonah, particularly common in Russian.

== Notable people ==
- Iona Allen (1937–2003), American seamstress
- Iona Anderson, Australian swimmer
- Iona Andronov (1934–2024), Russian politician
- Iona Banks (1920–2008), Welsh actress
- Iona Brown (1941–2004), British violinist and conductor
- Iona Campagnolo (1932–2024), Canadian politician
- Iona Campbell, Duchess of Argyll (1945–2024), Scottish noblewoman
- Iona Craig, British-Irish journalist
- Iona Fyfe, Scottish singer
- Iona Heath, English medical doctor and writer
- Iona Jones, Welsh television executive
- Iona Lake, British steeplechaser
- Iona Lupena, Cook Islander footballer
- Iona Macintyre, English scholar and translator
- Iona McDonald, Scottish sheriff
- Iona McGregor (1929–2021), Scottish LGBT author
- Iona McLeish, British theatre designer and author
- Iona Morris, American actress
- Iona Annabelle Neilson (1969–2018), English socialite
- Iona Nikitchenko (1895–1967), Soviet judge and jurist
- Iona Opie (1923–2017), English folklorist
- Iona Piʻikoi (1804–1859), Hawaiian high chief
- Iona Rothfeld, Chilean footballer
- Iona Rozeal Brown, American painter
- Iona Taylor (1908–1978), English Girl Guide leader
- Iona Thomas, British diplomat
- Iona Tuskiya (1901–1963), Soviet composer
- Iona Winnifrith, British Paralympic swimmer
- Iona Winter, New Zealander writer
- Iona Wynter, Jamaican triathlete
- Iona Yakir (1896–1937), Soviet military commander
