= MV Captayannis =

Greek freighter shipwrecked in the Firth of Clyde, Scotland

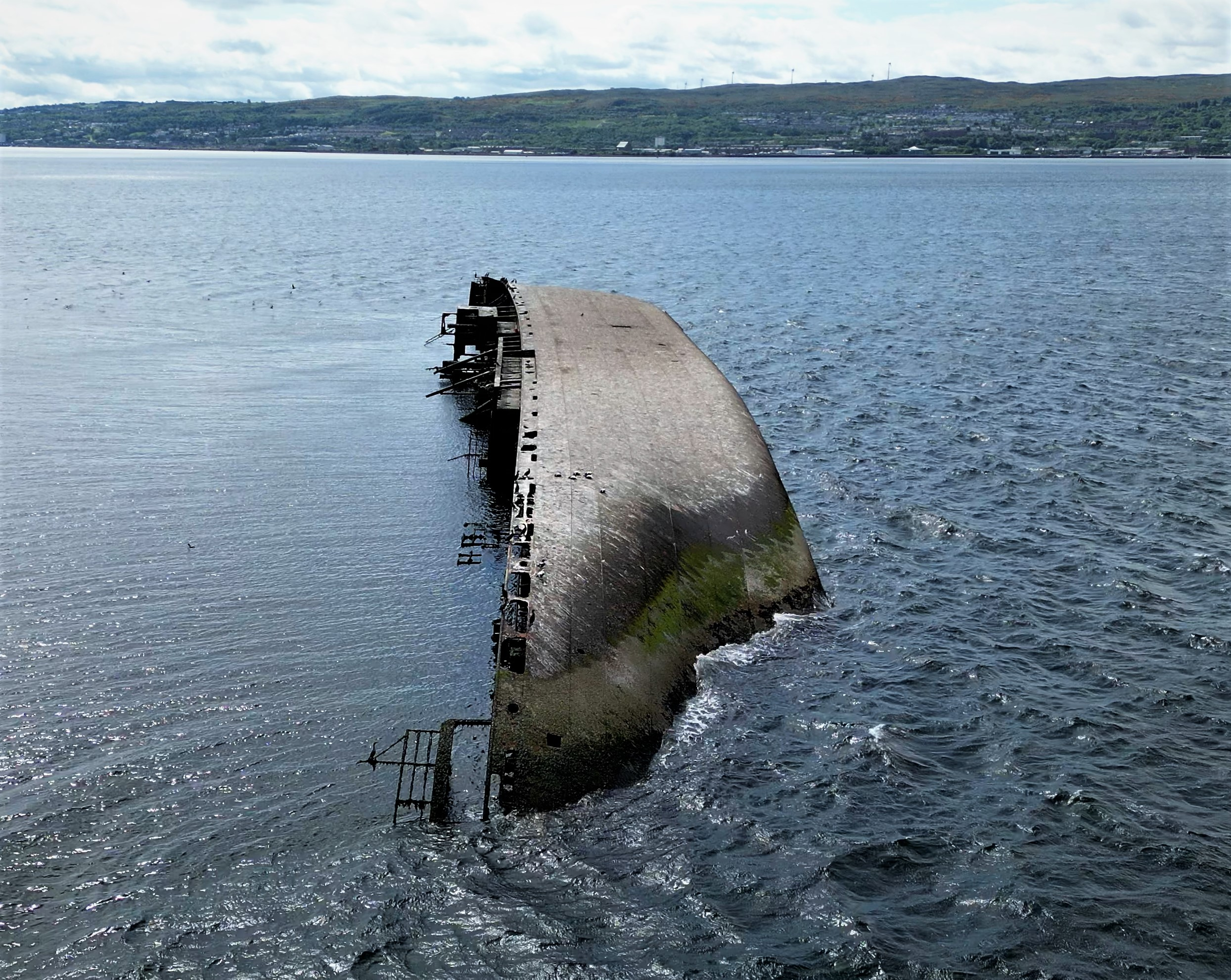
- Aerial view of the wreck of the Captayannis in 2023.

History

Greece
- Name: MV Captayannis
- Owner: M.& S.J. Paleocrassas Bros., Piraeus, Greece
- Port of registry: Piraeus
- Builder: A/S Nakskov Skibbs
- Launched: 15 June 1946 as Norden
- Renamed: Captayannis, 1963
- Identification: IMO number: 5415212
- Fate: Sunk, 27 January 1974

General characteristics
- Type: Merchant vessel
- Tonnage: 4,576 GRT
- Length: 396 ft (121 m)
- Beam: 56 ft 4 in (17.17 m)
- Draught: 25 ft (7.6 m)

The Captayannis was a Greek sugar-carrying vessel that sank in the Firth of Clyde, Scotland in 1974. Known as the Sugar Boat locally.

== Sinking ==
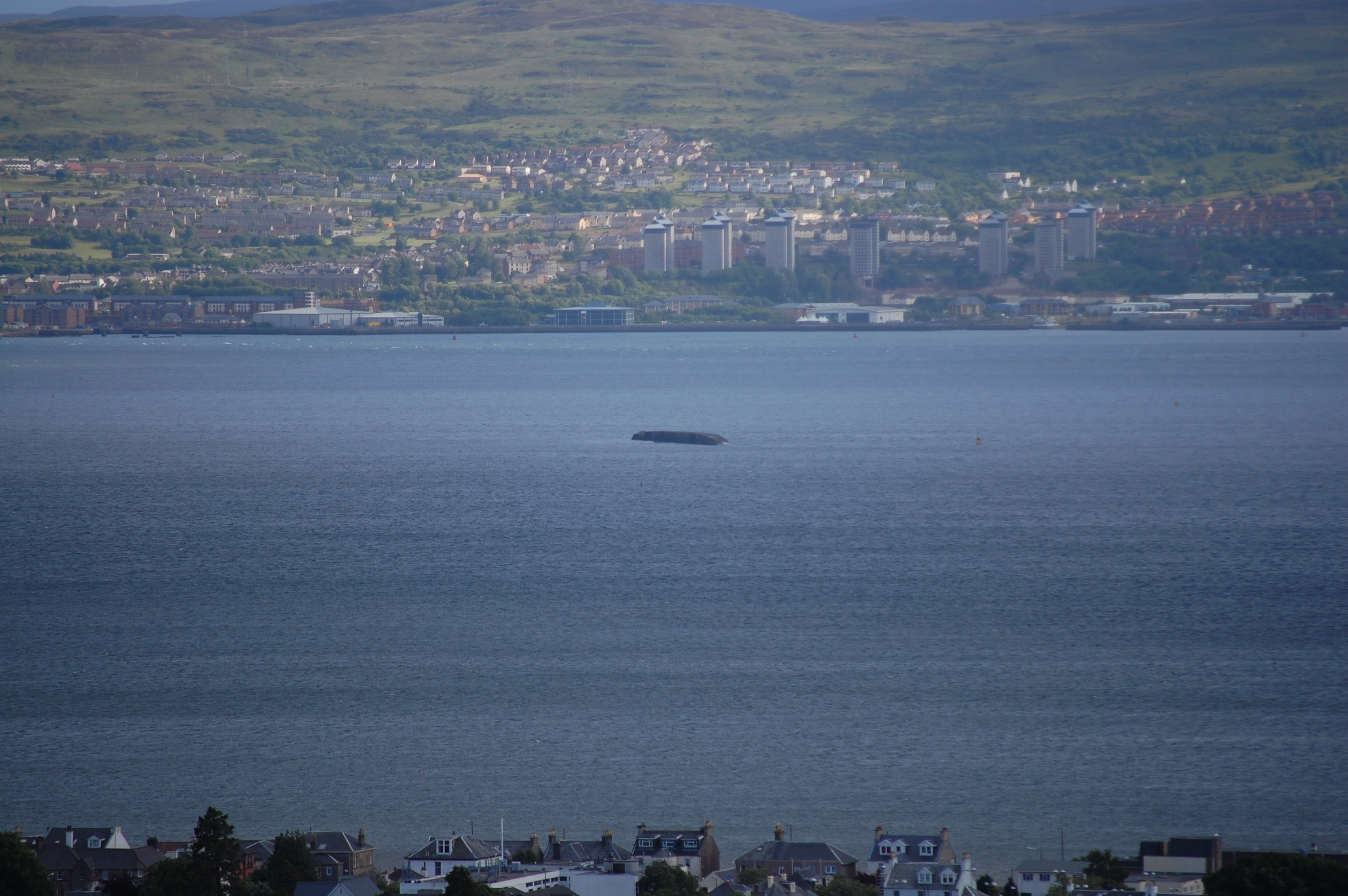
Photograph of Captayannis, taken from the north side of the Clyde in Helensburgh.

On the evening of 27 January 1974, a severe storm caused the 4,576 GRT Captayannis to drag her anchor while she was waiting at the Tail of the Bank to deliver sugar to the James Watt Dock in Greenock. Her captain ordered the engines to be started with the intention of running for the more sheltered waters of the Gareloch but before she could be brought to power she drifted onto the taut anchor chains of the BP tanker British Light. The tanker suffered no damage but her anchor chains holed the sugar boat below the waterline, allowing water to pour in.

Captayannis's Captain Theodorakis Ionnis, realizing that water was flowing in so fast that she was in imminent danger of sinking, opted to beach her in the shallow waters over the sandbank and steered to the desired spot where she stuck fast. The pilot boats, the tug Labrador and Clyde Marine Motoring's 20 metre passenger vessel Rover came to assist. The vessel heeled over so far that it was possible for the crew to jump onto the deck of the Rover. 25 of the crew were taken ashore aboard the Rover, but the Captain and four crewmen waited on the Labrador, standing off the stricken vessel. The ship finally succumbed the next morning, rolling onto her side. She has lain there ever since.

== Aftermath ==
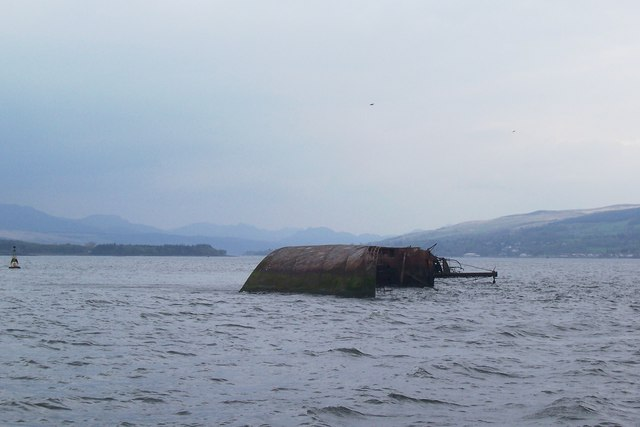
Captayannis in 2006

The wreck has been looted extensively leaving just steel hull and superstructure. Some of the wooden decking remains in remarkably good condition after more than 50 years in the sea. The hull remains sound, though her thinner deck plates are starting to rust through with holes opening up in places. Through time Captayannis has become 'home' to marine life and birds. She has never been removed as confusion surrounds the identity of her owners and insurers – no one accepts responsibility for her removal. She is known to many locals simply as the "sugar boat".

Boat Tours from Greenock are available.

The wreck is a familiar sight near the Tail of the Bank and can be seen on satellite images. The wreck is not to be confused with that of the French warship Maillé Brézé which sank nearby in 1940, but was later removed and cut up in Port Glasgow in 1956.

In June 2025 it was reported by the BBC that recent harsh weather over the winter, including Storm Éowyn, had accelerated the vessel's decline.

== Wreck ==
- Area: Sand bank between Greenock and Helensburgh
- Location: Firth of Clyde Scotland UK
- Position: 55°58′34″N 4°44′31″W
- Max. Depth: 9.00
- Year Sank: 1974
- How Sank: Hit anchor chain of another ship or hit the sandbank during a storm.
- Condition: Substantially intact
