= Iona Lupena =

Cook Islands footballer

Personal information
- Date of birth: 3 May 1984 (age 42)
- Position: Goalkeeper

Team information
- Current team: Manukau City AFC

Senior career*
Years	Team	Apps	(Gls)
- Manukau City AFC

International career
2009–	Cook Islands	3	(0)
- * Club domestic league appearances and goals

Iona Lupena is a footballer from the Cook Islands who plays for Manukau City AFC and the Cook Islands national football team.

== Manukau City ==
Suffering an injury while playing for Manukau City in April 2016, the club exigently needed a goalkeeper, so they brought in replacement Ron Lal; Lupena returned to training in June that year.
