= Iona nigrovittata =

Scientific classification
- Kingdom: Animalia
- Phylum: Arthropoda
- Subphylum: Chelicerata
- Class: Arachnida
- Order: Araneae
- Infraorder: Araneomorphae
- Family: Salticidae
- Subfamily: Salticinae
- Genus: Iona; Peckham & Peckham, 1886
- Species: I. nigrovittata

Binomial name
- Iona nigrovittata (Keyserling, 1882)

Synonyms
- Erasmia nigrovittata

Species of spider

Iona nigrovittata is a species of jumping spiders (family Salticidae) endemic to Tonga. It is the sole species in the genus Iona. It is endemic to Tonga.
