= RMS Columba =

Clyde-built paddle steamer (1878-1936)

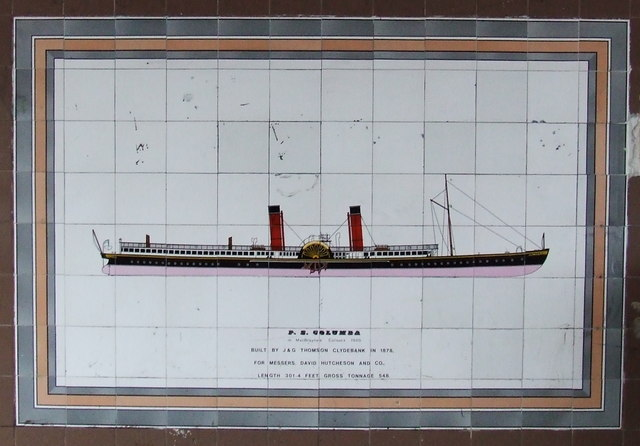
- PS Columba tile mosaic in a Greenock underpass

History

United Kingdom
- Name: PS/RMS Columba
- Namesake: Saint Columba
- Owner: 1878: David Hutcheson & Co.; 1879: David MacBrayne Ltd
- Builder: J & G Thomson, Clydebank
- Yard number: 162
- Launched: 9 April 1878
- In service: 1878
- Out of service: 1936
- Home port: Glasgow
- Fate: Scrapped, March 1936

General characteristics
- Class & type: Paddle steamer
- Tonnage: 543 GRT
- Length: 301.4 ft (91.9 m)
- Beam: 27.1 ft (8.3 m)
- Installed power: Twin cylinder, non compound oscillating
- Propulsion: side paddles

RMS Columba was a Clyde paddle steamer, MacBrayne's flagship from 1879 to 1935. She ran the first leg of "The Royal Route" to Ardrishaig for fifty eight summers.

== History ==
Columba was built by J & G Thomson of Clydebank, for David Hutcheson & Co. (later David MacBrayne Ltd). Commissioned for the first stage of the "Royal Route" to Loch Fyne, she was the flagship of the MacBrayne fleet from 1879 to 1935 and is often considered the finest Clyde steamer of all time. She brought new elegance and comfort to Scottish travel, and typified the mid-Victorian tourist steamer at its best.

Columba and her sister ship Iona were well maintained and kept their lustre to the end. Both were retired and broken up side by side at shipbreakers, Arnott & Young at Dalmuir in March 1936.

== Layout ==
Columba was modelled on Hutcheson's Iona, which she was destined to replace. She had a curved bow and two funnels and was fitted out to a high standard. There were a barber's shop and a post office on board.

When Columba was re boilered in 1900, her four navy boilers were replaced by two haystack boilers. The reduction in weight meant that she floated five inches higher in the water. At the same time, a smoking room was erected on the promenade deck immediately abaft the after funnel.

== Service ==
All of Columba's distinguished career was on the first leg of "The Royal Route" from Glasgow to Ardrishaig, calling at Rothesay and the Kyles of Bute. The route, so named after Queen Victoria sailed from the Clyde in 1847, was used by the cream of Victorian and Edwardian society to reach estates in the Highlands. Columba visited Ardrishaig over 5600 times in her 58-year career. Other vessels took the continuation of the Royal Route through the Crinan Canal to Oban, Fort William and Inverness (through the Caledonian Canal).

Columba was replaced by MacBrayne's turbine steamer Saint Columba (formerly Queen Alexandra). In the early 1970s, her name was honoured in the building of the Anderston Centre regeneration complex - along with that of fellow Clyde steamers the SS Dalraida and SS Davaar - the names of these three vessels were applied to the centre's three residential tower blocks in reference to the Anderston docks which they regularly visited.
