= Fort Matilda railway station =

Railway station in Inverclyde, Scotland

Fort Matilda Scottish Gaelic: Gearastan Matilda
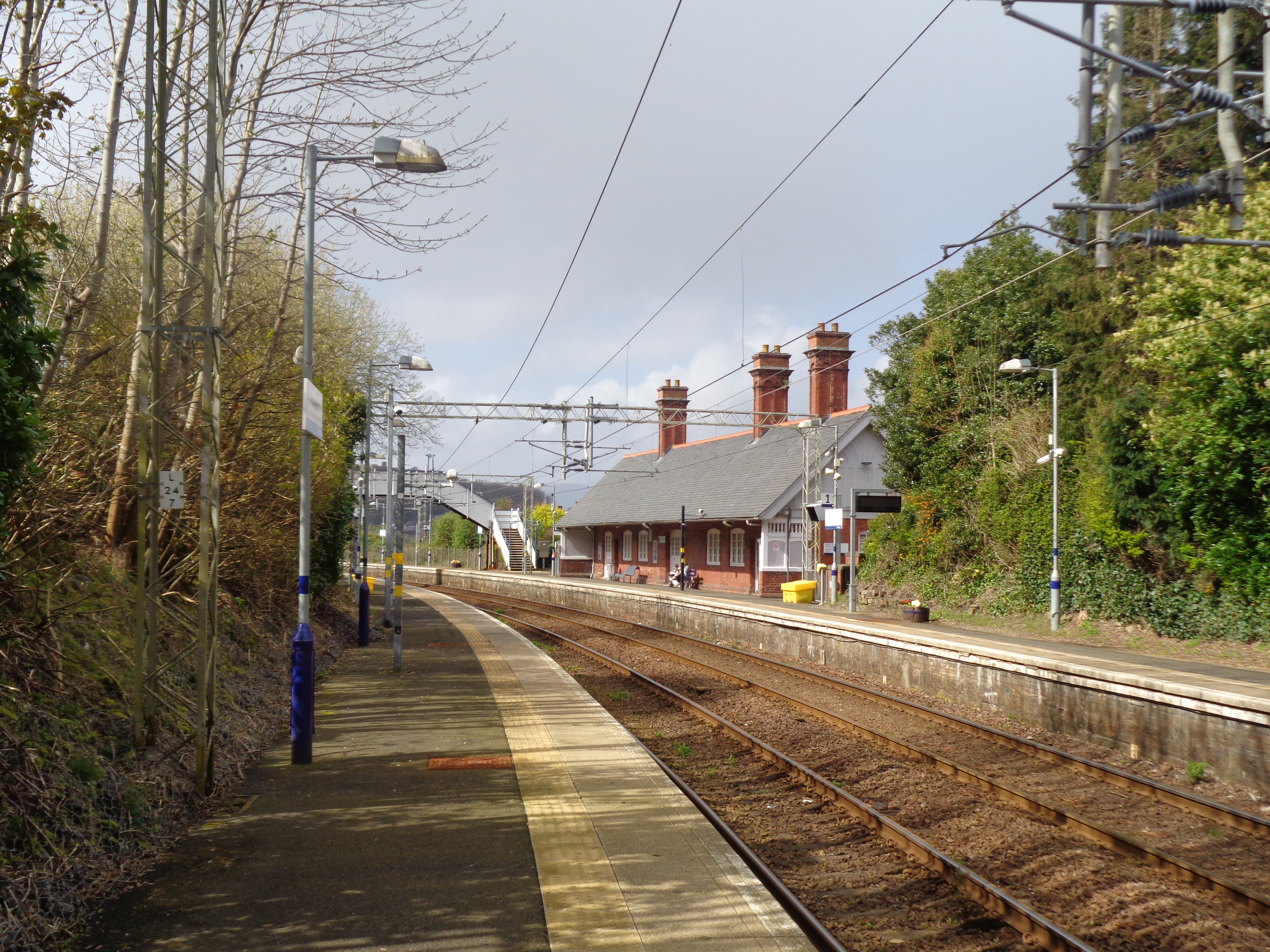
- View west towards Gourock

General information
- Location: Fort Matilda, Inverclyde; Scotland
- Coordinates: 55.9589°N 4.7949°W
- Grid reference: NS256775
- Manager: ScotRail
- Platforms: 2

Other information
- Station code: FTM

History
- Original company: Caledonian Railway
- Pre-grouping: Caledonian Railway
- Post-grouping: London, Midland and Scottish Railway

Key dates
- 1 June 1889: Opened
- 5 February 1973: Temporarily closed
- 20 April 1973: Reopened
- October 1993: Closed
- ?: Reopened

Passengers
- 2021/22: ▲60,052
- 2022/23: ▲85,186
- 2023/24: ▲0.102 million
- 2024/25: ▲0.116 million
- 2025/26: ▲0.121 million

Listed Building – Category B
- Designated: 5 March 1982
- Reference no.: LB34174
Location
Notes
- Passenger statistics from the Office of Rail and Road

Fort Matilda railway station lies at the far western edge of the town of Greenock, Scotland. It is a non-staffed station, and is the last stop before the terminus of Gourock railway station on the Inverclyde Line out of Glasgow Central station.

== History ==
The station was opened by the Caledonian Railway on 1 June 1889 when the Greenock line was extended to Gourock. It was closed temporarily between 5 February and 20 April 1973. It closed again in October 1993. The station has continued in use on an unstaffed basis, with passengers getting their tickets on the train.

In 2011 the station building was taken over by the Greenock & District Model Railway Club, which obtained necessary approvals and funding from the Railway Heritage Trust and the Stations Community Regeneration Fund for conservation work and improvements to make the building into a clubhouse. Features such as external doors and screens are to be restored to their original appearance, and when completed accommodation will also be made available to other groups as well as use by the model railway club.

== Services ==
The typical off-peak service in trains per hour is:

- 2 tph to Glasgow Central via Paisley Gilmour Street
- 2 tph to Gourock

Additional trains call at the station during peak hours.

Preceding station	National Rail	Following station
Gourock	ScotRail; Inverclyde Line	Greenock West
	Historical railways	
Gourock	Caledonian Railway; Glasgow, Paisley and Greenock Railway	Greenock West
