= PS Iona (1855) =

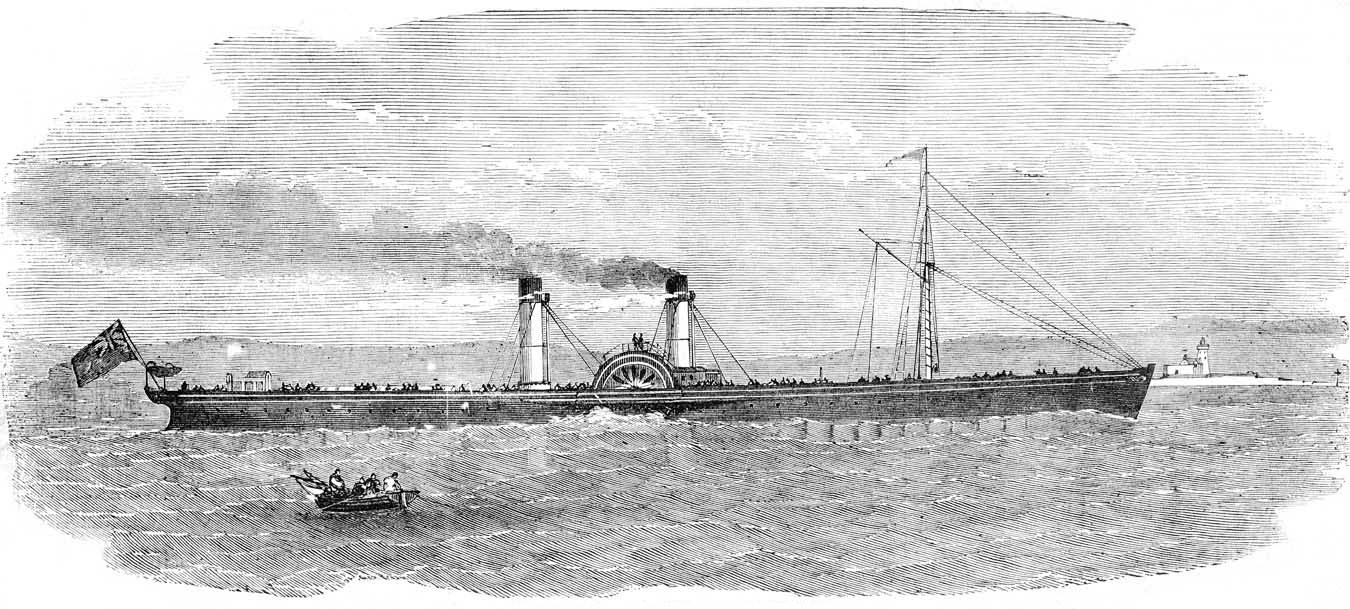

Location of the wreck of the Iona I in Inverclyde.

The Iona was a Scottish-built paddle steamer purchased by Confederate agents for use as a blockade runner during the American Civil War. Following a collision with Chanticleer, she sank in the Upper Clyde near Fort Matilda in October 1862. The wreck, which lies around 27 m below chart datum, is now designated as a Historic Marine Protected Area by Historic Environment Scotland.
