= PS Iona (1864) =

MacBrayne Paddle Steamer

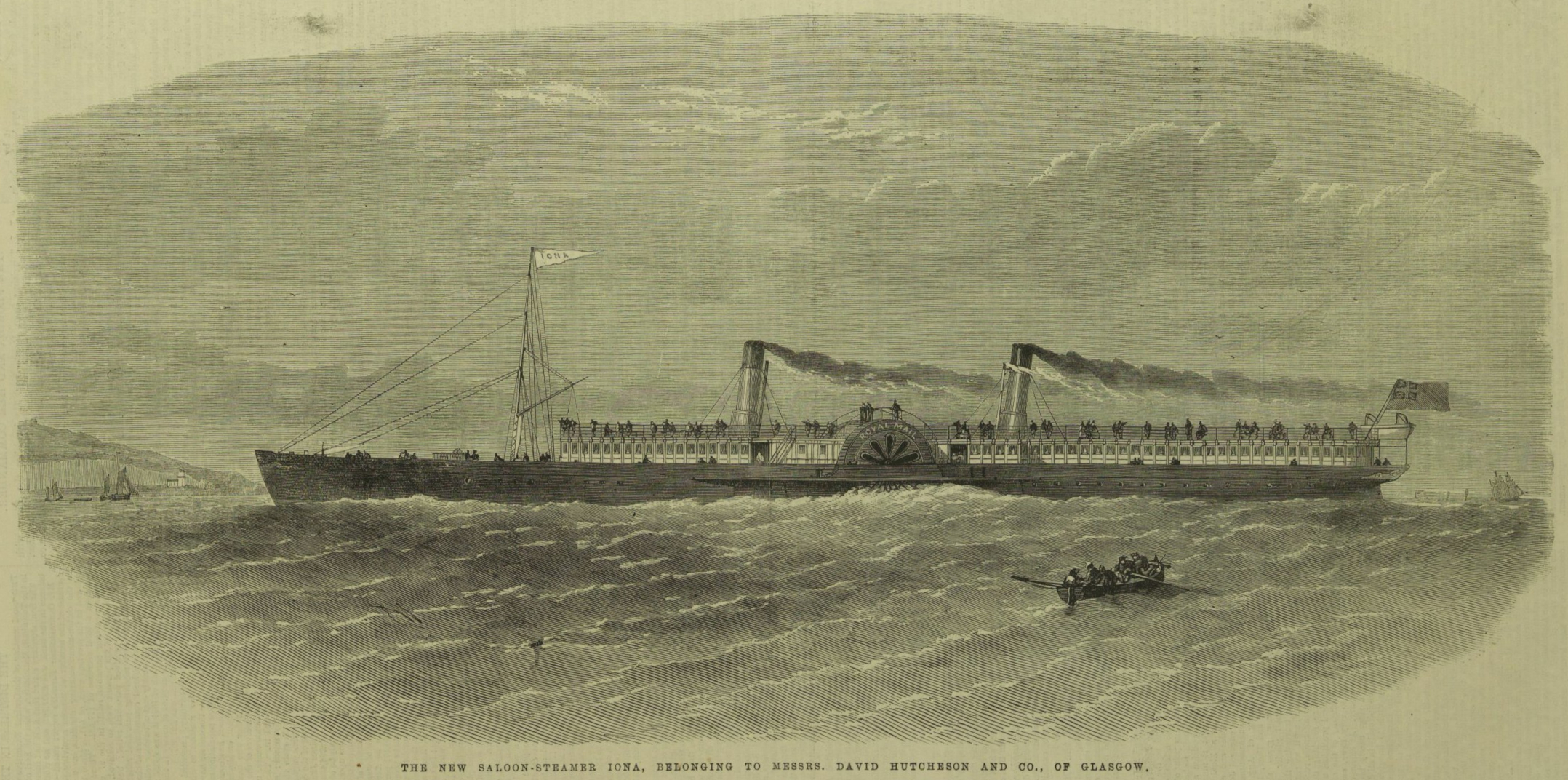
- The near-identical Iona of 1863

History

United Kingdom
- Name: PS Iona
- Namesake: Sacred Isle Iona
- Owner: 1864: David Hutcheson & Co.; 1879: David MacBrayne Ltd
- Route: Clyde & Western Isles steamer services
- Builder: J & G Thomson, Clydebank
- Yard number: 77
- Launched: 10 May 1864
- In service: 1864
- Out of service: 1936
- Home port: Glasgow
- Fate: Scrapped, March 1936

General characteristics
- Class & type: Paddle steamer
- Tonnage: 393 GRT
- Length: 255.5 ft (77.9 m)
- Beam: 25.6 ft (7.8 m)
- Depth: 9 ft (2.7 m)
- Installed power: Twin cylinder, simple oscillating
- Propulsion: side paddles
- Speed: 19.1 kn (trials)

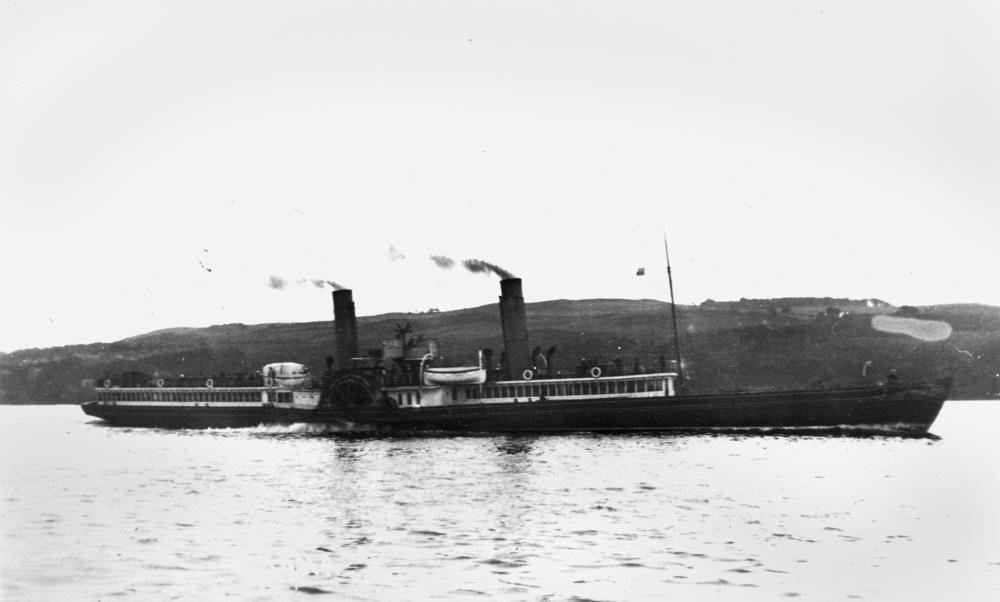
Saloon-Steamer Iona

PS Iona was a MacBrayne paddle steamer, which operated on the Clyde for 72 years, the longest-serving Clyde steamer.

== History ==
Iona was built in 1864 to replace Iona (II) of 1863. She was built by J & G Thomson of Clydebank, for David Hutcheson & Co., which became David MacBrayne Ltd in 1879. Two previous Clyde vessels had borne the same name. Both had been sold to the USA for blockade running and lost early en route.

Iona became the longest-serving Clyde steamer. After 72 years service, she was retired and broken up side-by-side with her younger sister, RMS Columba at shipbreakers, Arnott & Young at Dalmuir in March 1936.

== Layout ==
Iona had a curved and engraved bow and two funnels. Some of her fittings came from the earlier Iona (II). In 1873 she was fitted with telegraphs and steam steering gear for service on the Ardrishaig route. She was re-boilered in 1875 and again in 1891, with Haystack type boilers. During the 1891 refit, her funnels were lengthened and moved closer together.

== Service ==
Iona (III) was the main Ardrishaig steamer until the arrival of RMS Columba in 1878. After that, she continued to operate the early and late season service, sailing out of Oban for the rest of the summer. She stayed on the Clyde during the Great War and for a short while was chartered to the Caledonian Steam Packet Company, working from Wemyss Bay. After the war, she was refitted and had new saloons added. She then sailed to Lochgoilhead and Arrochar, and later from Oban to Fort William.
