= Fort Matilda =

Area in Greenock, Inverclyde, Scotland

Coordinates: 55.9589°N 4.7953°W

Fort Matilda is an area of the town of Greenock in Inverclyde, Scotland. Its name comes from a coastal battery built on Whiteforeland Point 1814–1819 to defend the River Clyde.

== History ==
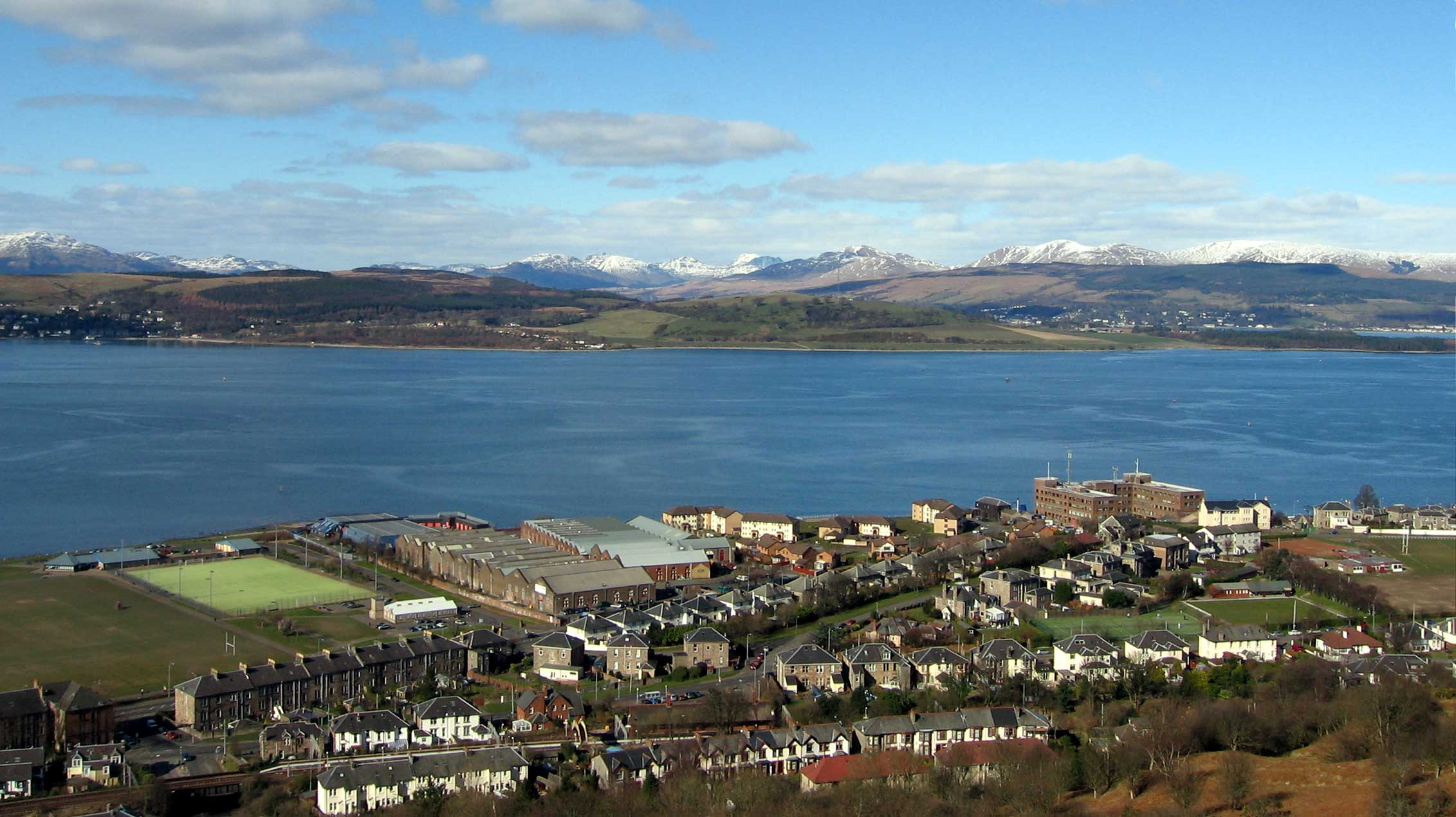
The Fort Matilda area of Greenock, with the River Clyde behind

In 1862 the Confederate paddle steamer Iona I collided with Chanticleer and sank off Fort Matilda. There was no loss of life. The site of the wreck is designated as a Historic Marine Protected Area.

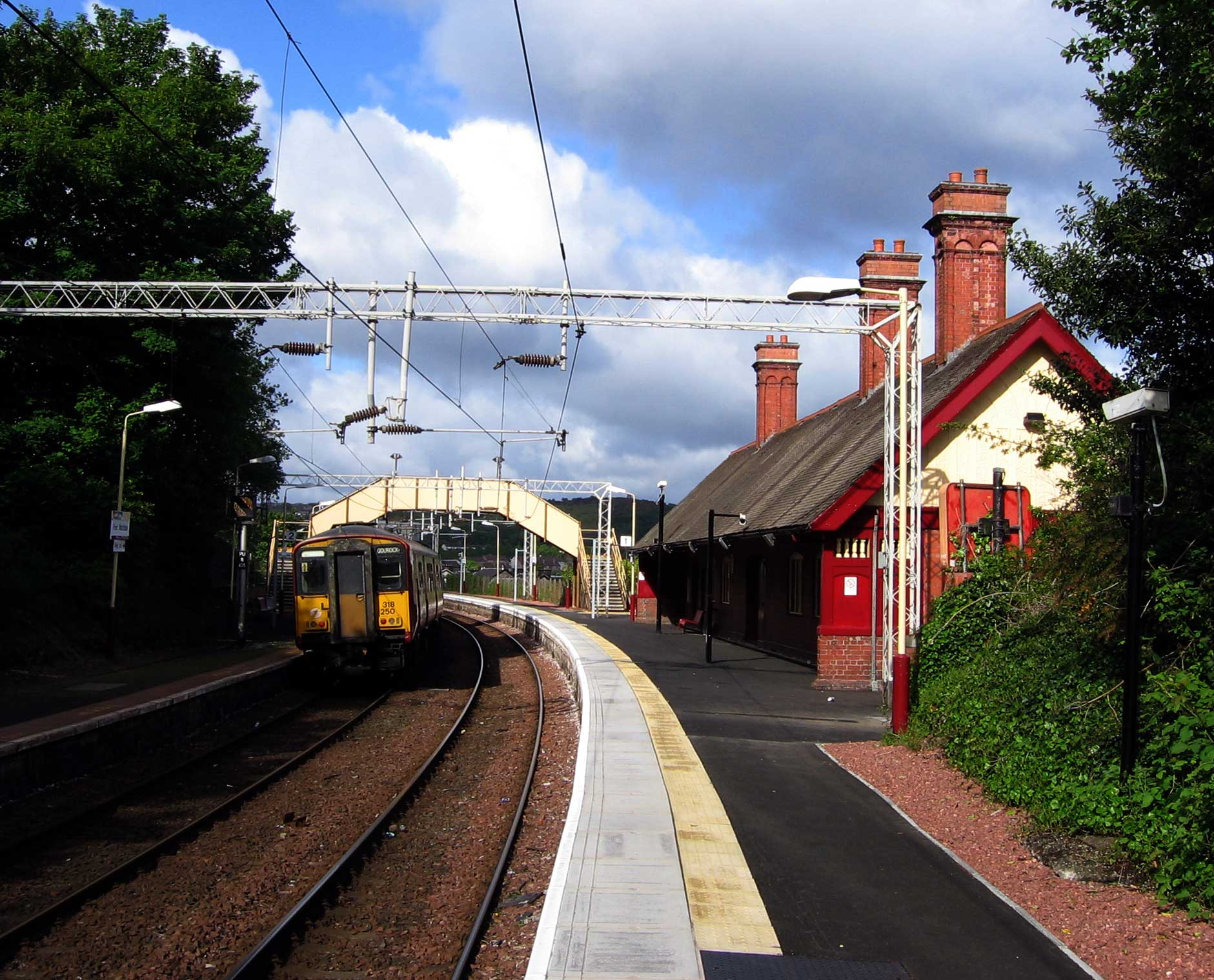
Fort Matilda Station

The suburb is served by Fort Matilda railway station which was built for the Caledonian Railway in 1889.

In the 1890s the fort was renovated with the addition of a pier to support a minefield which had been built offshore, and refurbished again in 1902–1904.

A Royal Naval Torpedo Factory was opened in Fort Matilda in 1910–1912 which was designed to be the principal centre of torpedo manufacture and development in Britain. The location sits on the opposite side of the River Clyde from the Holy Loch, which was used as a torpedo testing range. The pier at Fort Matilda was widely used by the United States Navy as an unloading point for supplies destined for the base on the Holy Loch.

During World War I the military base was the headquarters of the Renfrewshire Fortress Engineers. The fort was demolished shortly before World War II and the torpedo factory closed in 1951 when production was moved to Alexandria.

== Today ==
Today Fort Matilda is a mostly residential suburb of villas and town houses between Greenock and Gourock town centres. It is home to the largest confectionery factory in Scotland, Buchanan's, Greenock Wanderers rugby club, and the Royal West of Scotland Amateur boating club. Battery Park in the area also plays host to the Gourock Highland Games.
