= Spango Valley =

Coordinates: 55.930206°N 4.830491°W

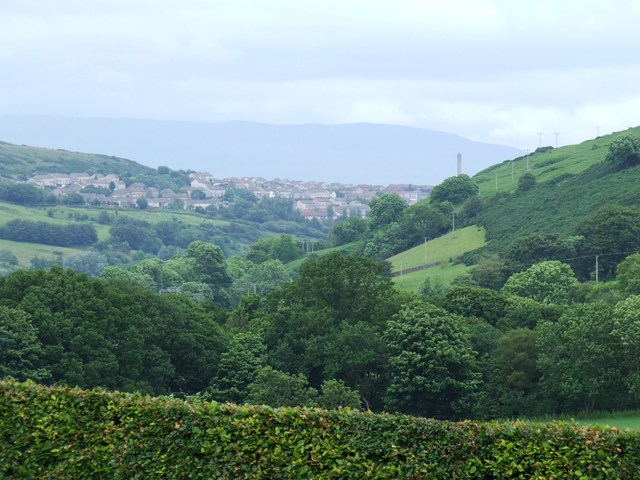
- Spango Valley from Langhill

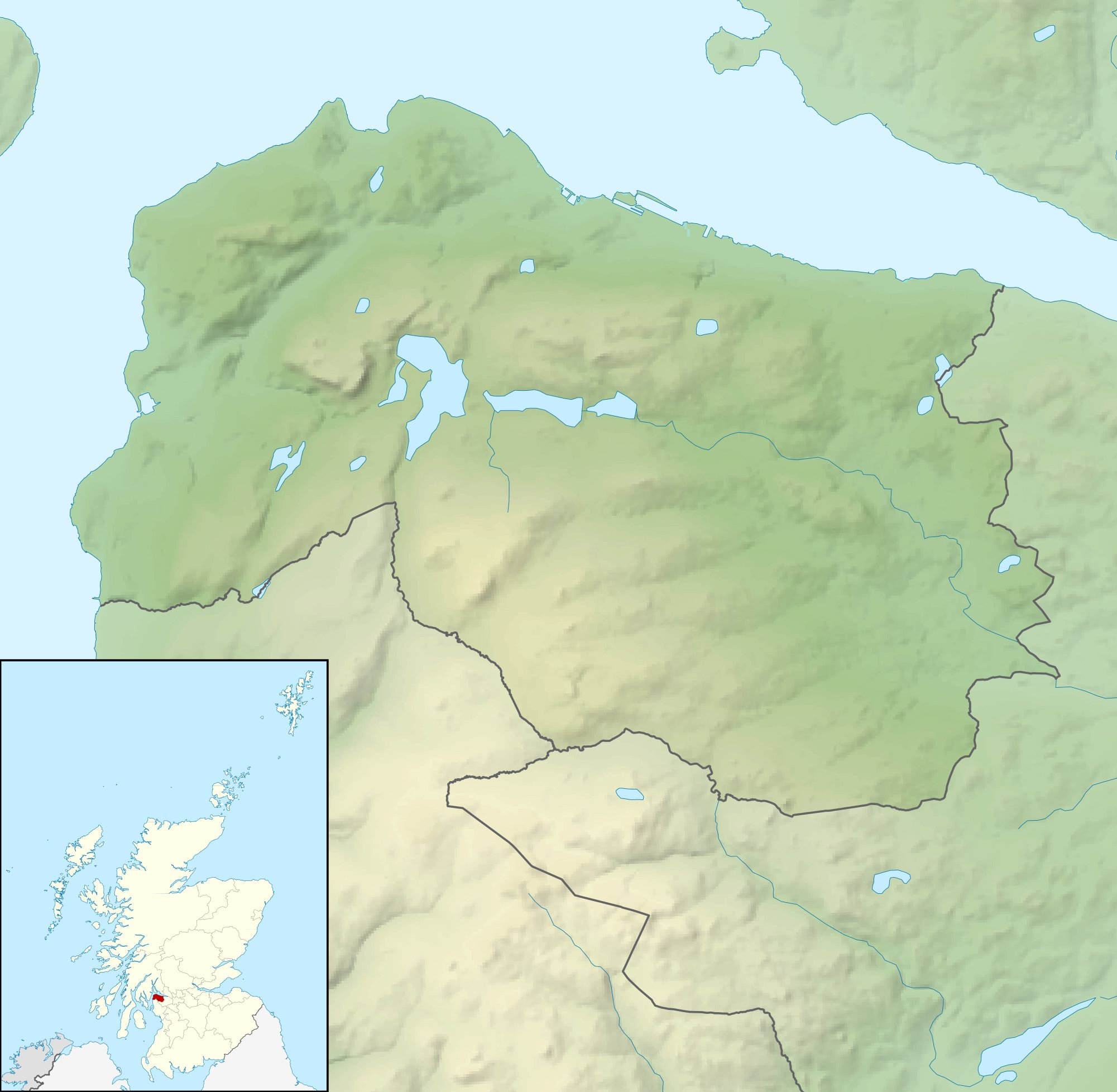
- Location within Inverclyde
- OS grid reference: NS 2332 7441
- Council area: Inverclyde
- Lieutenancy area: Renfrewshire
- Country: Scotland
- Sovereign state: United Kingdom
- Post town: GREENOCK
- Postcode district: PA16
- Dialling code: 01475
- UK Parliament: Inverclyde
- Scottish Parliament: Greenock and Inverclyde

Spango Valley is a steep sided valley to the south-west of Greenock, Scotland. It runs approximately south west to north east for around 2.4 km (1.5 mi) uphill from the confluence of the Spango Burn and Kip Water near Dunrod Farm, to Ravenscraig at the present day Aileymill Gardens. A small stream known as the Spango Burn, runs along the valley floor. The originally meandering burn has been channelised and straightened for much of its length as it runs south west through the valley.

== IBM ==
IBM opened a factory in the valley in 1954 to manufacture typewriters and other office equipment. The factory expanded along the valley floor through the 60s, 70s, 80s and 90s, extending to 1.6 km (1 mi) in length at its peak as the business moved from typewriters to bank terminals and eventually to Personal Computers in the early 1980s. The 1954 factory was built on the site of Kingston Farm, the final building to be constructed by IBM was a call centre, on the site of Spango Farm, which was demolished to make way for it. Remaining farms in the valley are Dunrod, Chrisswell, Flatterton and Leitchland.

By 2009, the IBM factory was partially demolished as parts of the PC manufacturing business were sold to other companies. Around this time, the site and remaining buildings were sold by IBM and rebranded as Valley Park, from whom IBM leased some of the buildings that they still occupied. Another occupant on the site at that time was the National Microelectronics Institute. IBM completely vacated the site in October 2016 and moved to the east end of Greenock.

By September 2020, all buildings on the former IBM campus had been demolished.

=== IBM Gallery ===
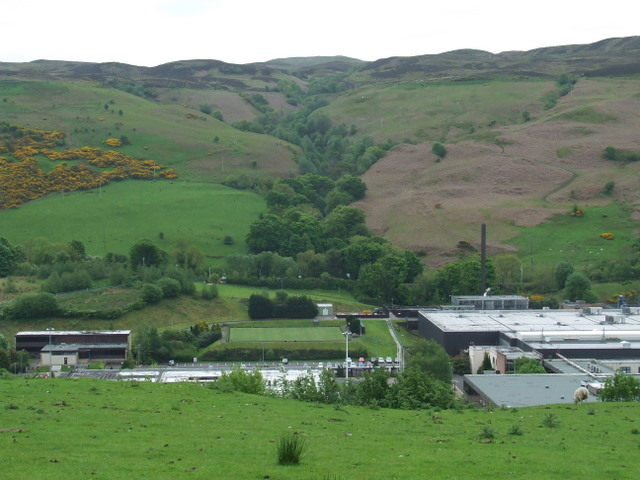
Spango Valley: view of IBM railway station and the "Hole of Spango" from Ailleymill Road

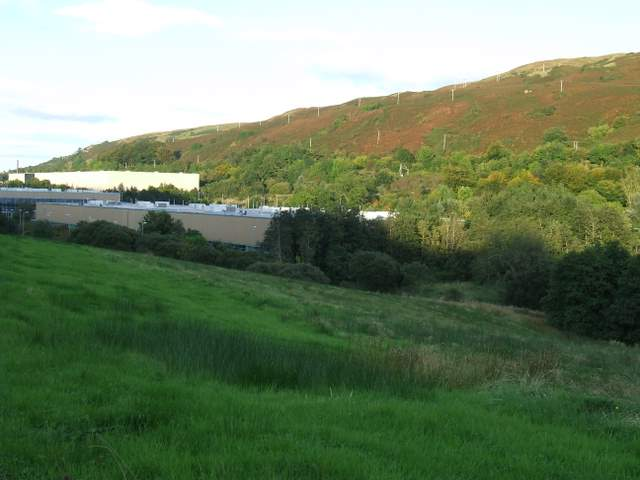
Buildings at the south end of the IBM campus

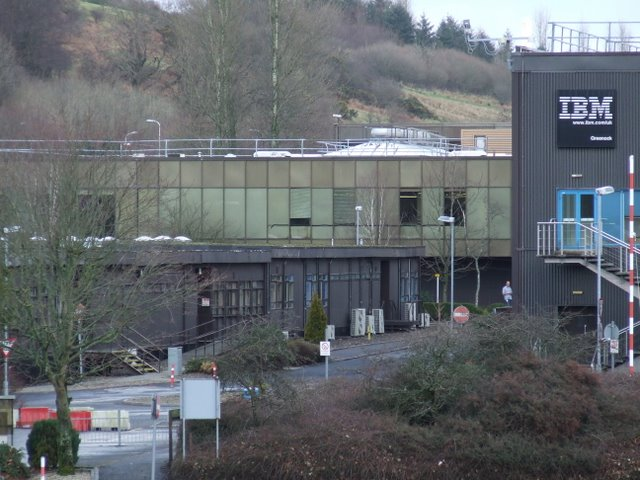
IBM buildings in 2009

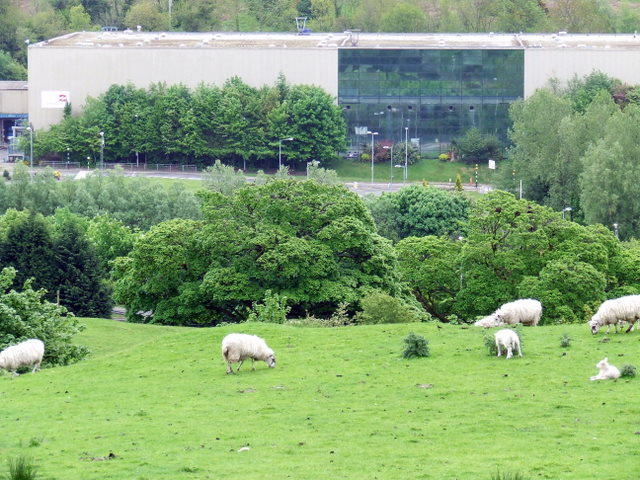
Sanmina SCI branding on the former IBM Automated Materials Distribution Centre building

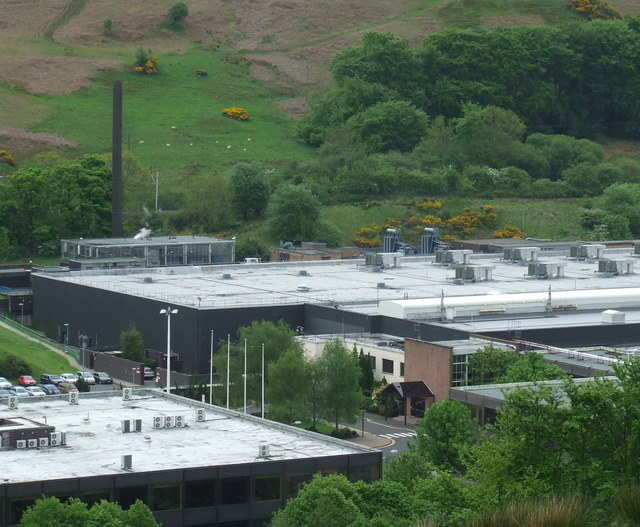
IBM Reception in 2008

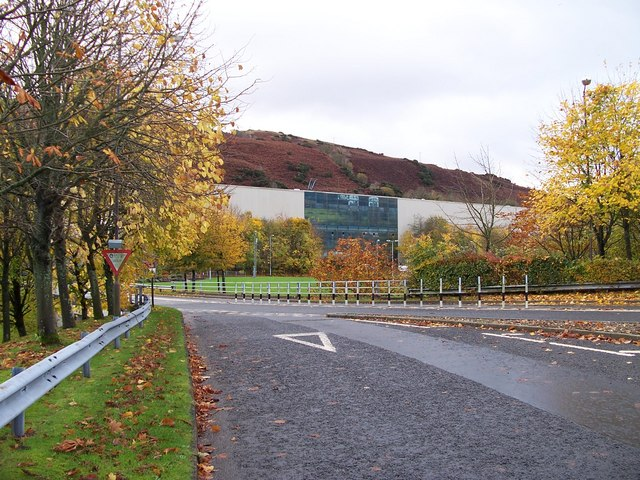
IBM Automated Materials Distribution Centre building

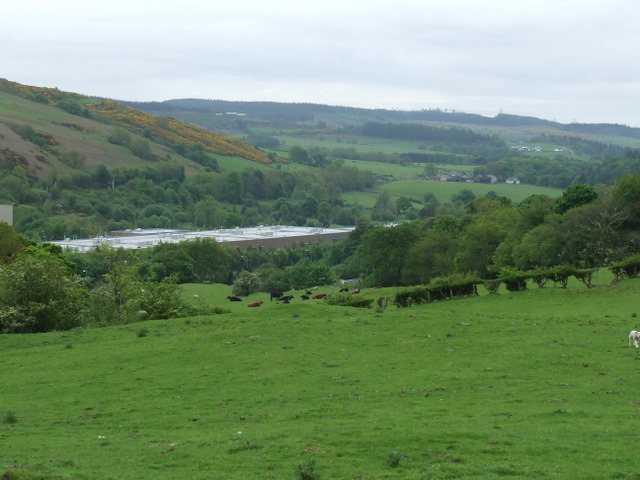
IBM buildings in 2008

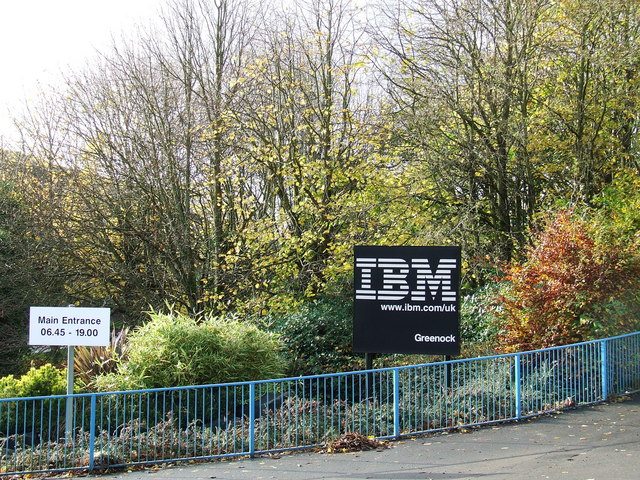
IBM main access road in 2007

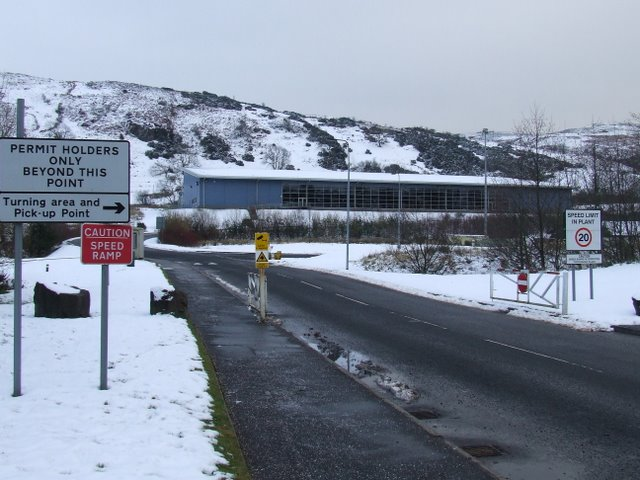
IBM call centre building in 2009

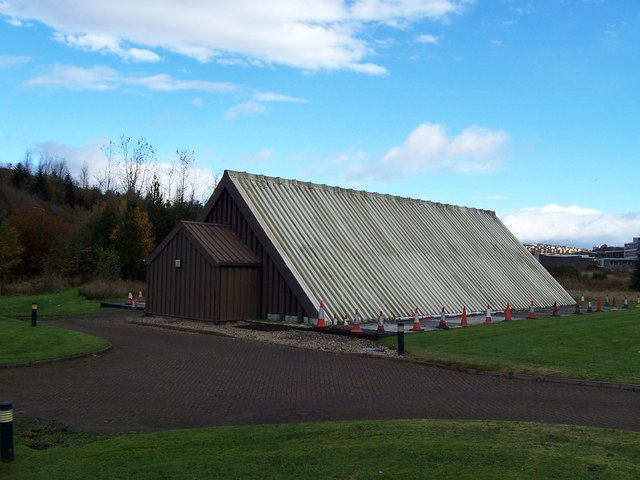
A plastic building which housed a lab to test computer products for electrical emissions

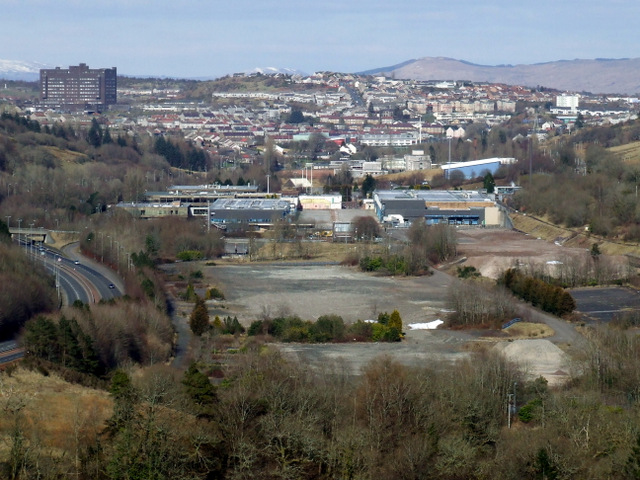
This 2013 photo shows that much of the factory has been demolished

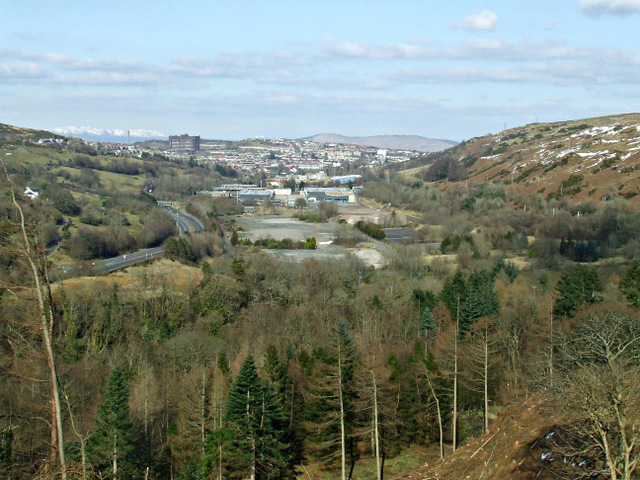
This 2013 photo shows that much of the factory has been demolished

== Inverkip Road ==
In the early 1980s the A742 Inverkip Road through Spango Valley was substantially upgraded to dual carriageway standard to accommodate the increased traffic to and from the IBM complex and the nearby Inverkip Power Station which has also since been demolished. At that time, the road was renumbered to A78 and became a trunk road. The former A78 road (through Gourock) was renumbered to A770 at the same time.

=== Inverkip Road Gallery ===
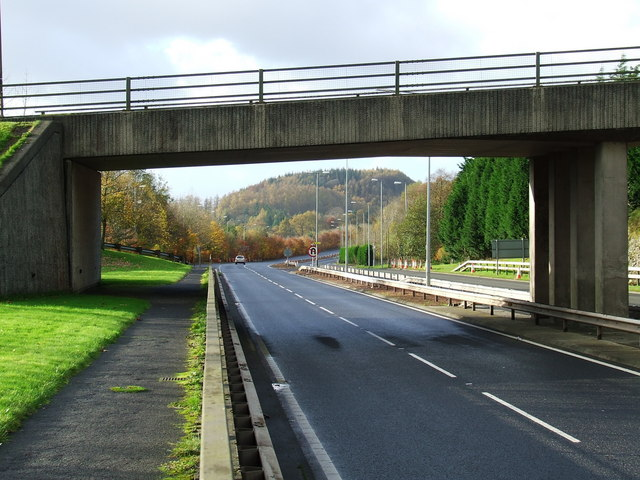
The "IBM flyover" which provided access to the IBM campus from the A78

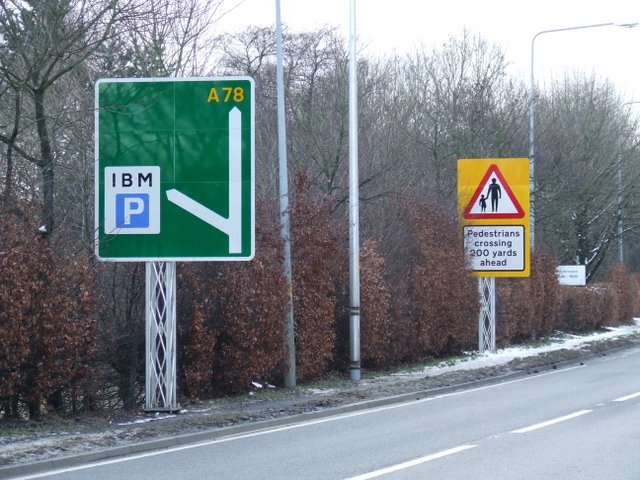
New road signs on the approach to the (by now mostly derelict) IBM campus

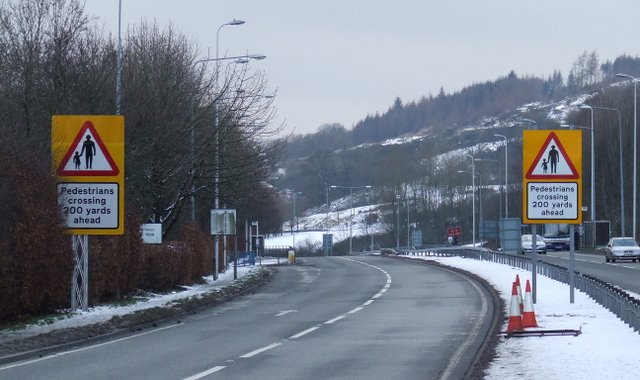
Pedestrians crossing warning signs on the approach to the IBM campus

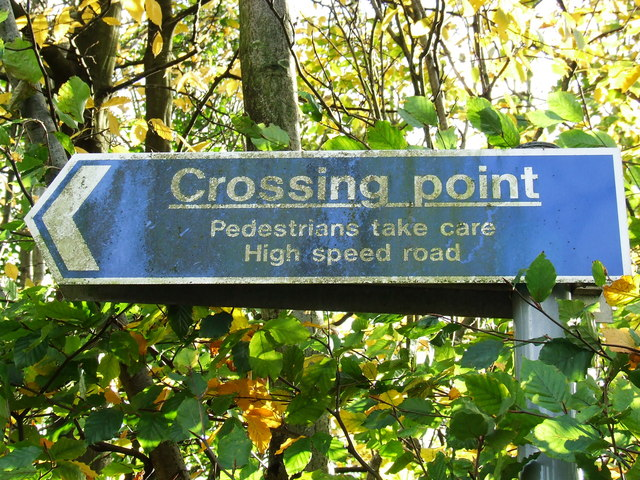
Warning sign at the pedestrian crossing point at the IBM campus

== Railway ==
The Greenock and Wemyss Bay Railway Company opened a line from Port Glasgow, through Spango Valley to Wemyss Bay in 1865. Ravenscraig station was a single platform station, located at the extreme north end of the valley, which was in use from 1865 to 1944.

Now part of the electrified Inverclyde railway line between Glasgow Central and Wemyss Bay, the single track line passes along the east side of the valley (between Branchton and Inverkip stations). IBM railway station, which opened in May 1978 as IBM Halt to serve the IBM factory had its services suspended on 8 December 2018 following demolition of the IBM factory.

A branch line left the main line at Dunrod Farm at the extreme south end of the valley. This approximately 1.6 km (1 mi) long mineral line ran to the sandstone quarries at the top of Shielhill Glen.

=== Railway Gallery ===
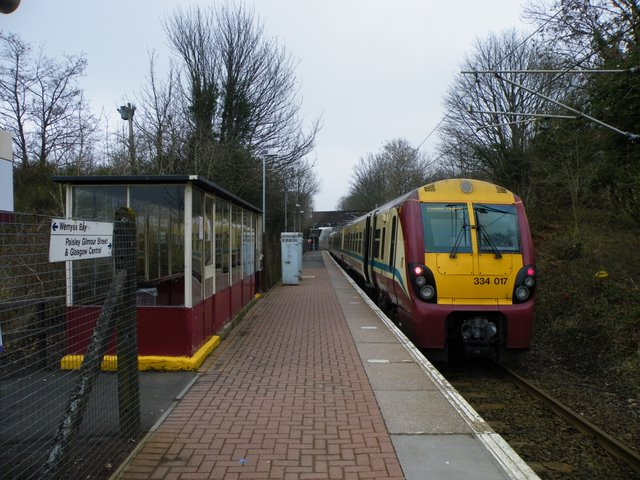
IBM Halt in 2009

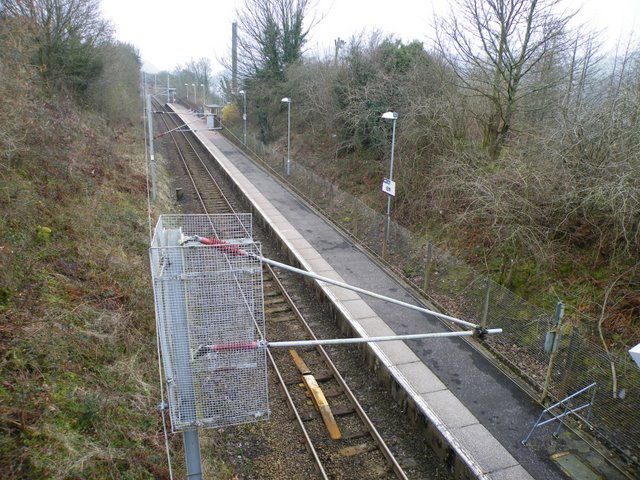
IBM Halt in 2009

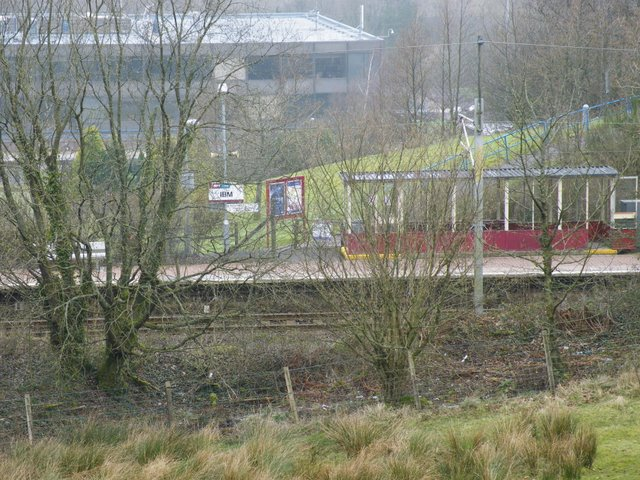
IBM Halt in 2009

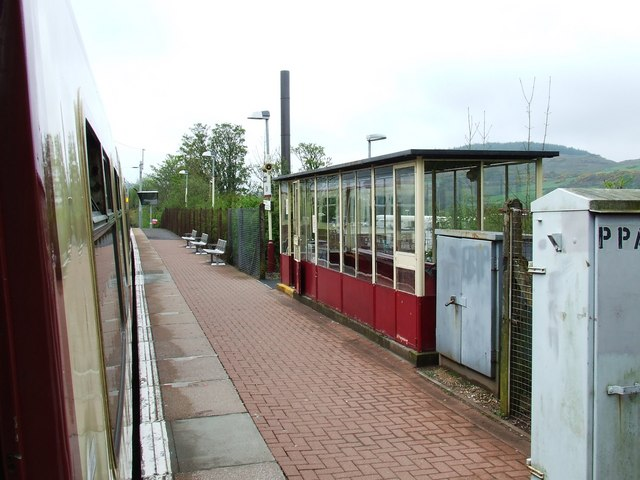
IBM Halt in 2007

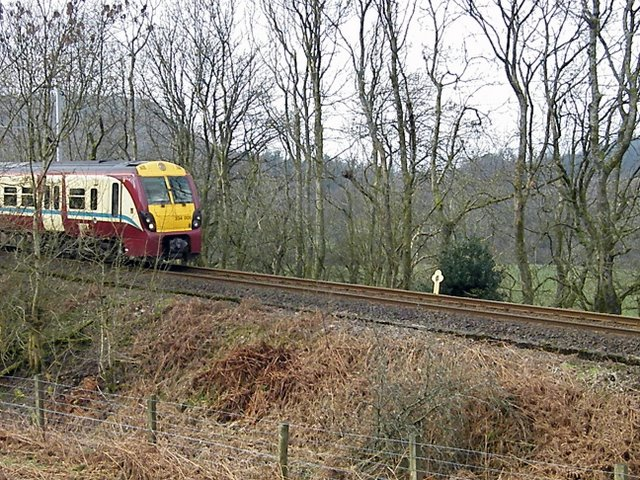
A train at the south end of the valley

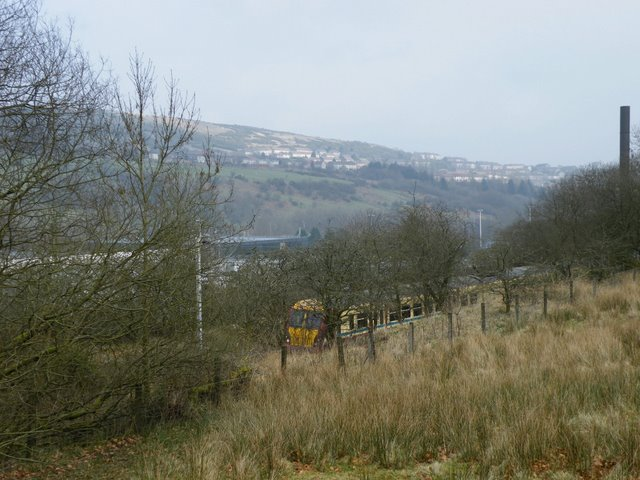
A train passing the IBM boiler house

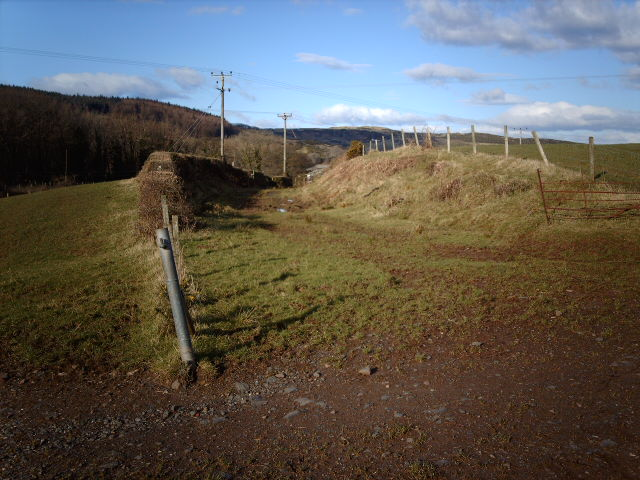
Remains of the mineral line junction at Dunrod in 2006

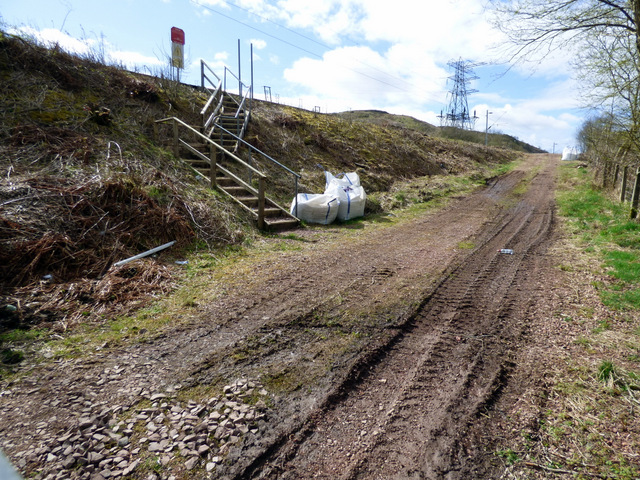
Site of Ravenscraig railway station

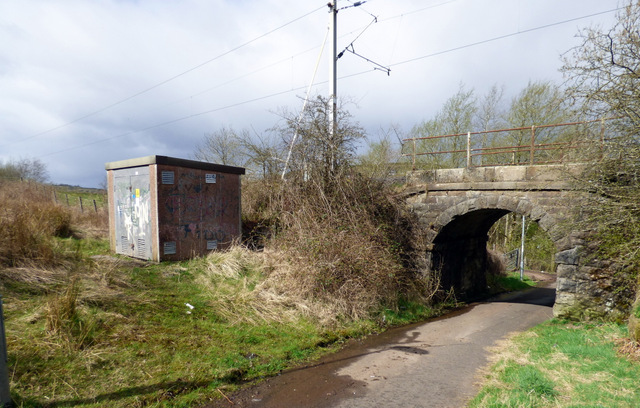
Site of Ravenscraig railway station

== Schools in the valley ==
Two schools were located adjacent to each other in the north end of the valley. They shared an access road off Inverkip Road, including a bridge over the Spango Burn.

Greenock High School opened their new building 1971. This replaced the former high school building on Dunlop Street.

The new Glenburn Special Needs School opened in the 1960s.

By 2014, both schools had been closed and demolished. Glenburn relocated to the 'super campus' in the east end of Port Glasgow and Greenock High School merged with wellington Academy High School formally Gove park to form Inverclyde Academy.

The schools site was later prepared for the construction of a new £75 million 300 cell prison for women. This included the building of a new access road and bridge across the Spango Burn. However, plans were dropped by the Scottish Government before construction began. This was due to a change in government policy related to the imprisonment of women. The site remains fenced off and unused at the time of writing in January 2022.

=== Schools in the valley Gallery ===
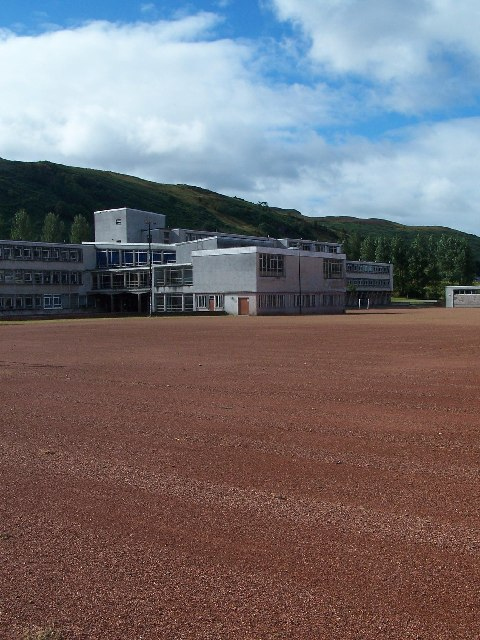
Greenock High School in 2005

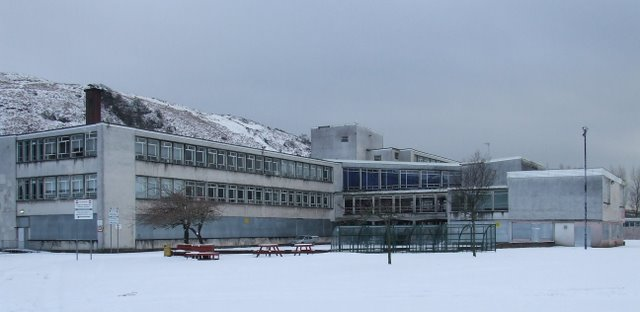
Greenock High School awaits demolition in 2009

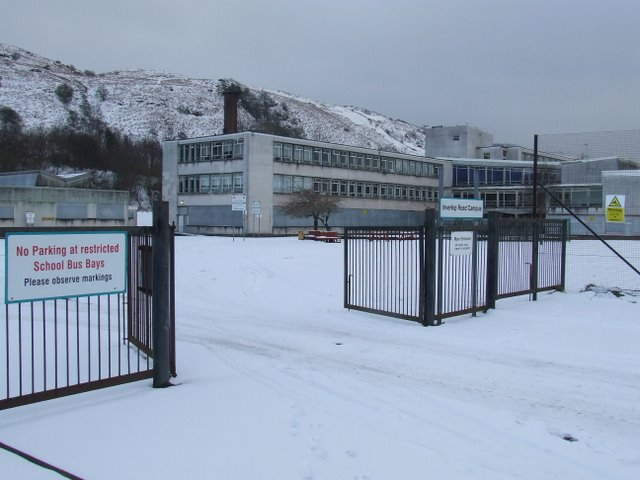
Greenock High School awaits demolition in 2009

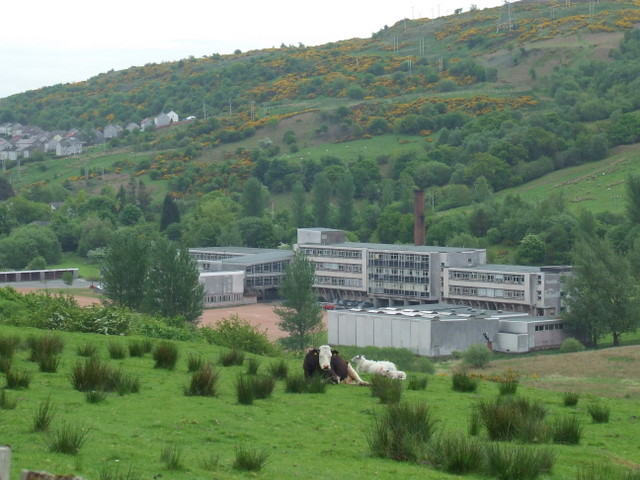
Former Greenock High School building in 2008

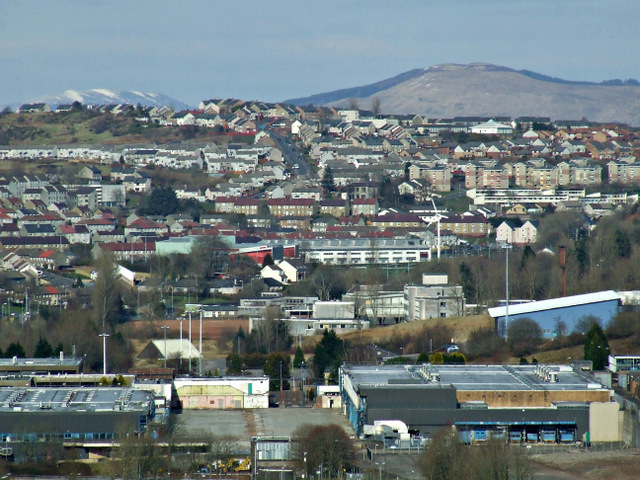
Greenock High School and Glenburn School can be seen in this view

== Current state ==
The valley floor south of Aileymill Gardens is now (April 2023) a brownfield site, extending approximately 2.1 km (1.3 mi) from end to end. The last of the former IBM buildings was demolished in March 2022. The remaining land is farmland, with some other housing on the northern fringes.

== Future development ==
An amended proposal for a £100 million mixed-use development on the northern half of the former IBM site by a local company was approved by Inverclyde Council in March 2023. The plans include houses, shops, leisure and community facilities.
