= Whinhill railway station =

Railway station in Inverclyde, Scotland

Whinhill Scottish Gaelic: Cnoc a' Chonaisg
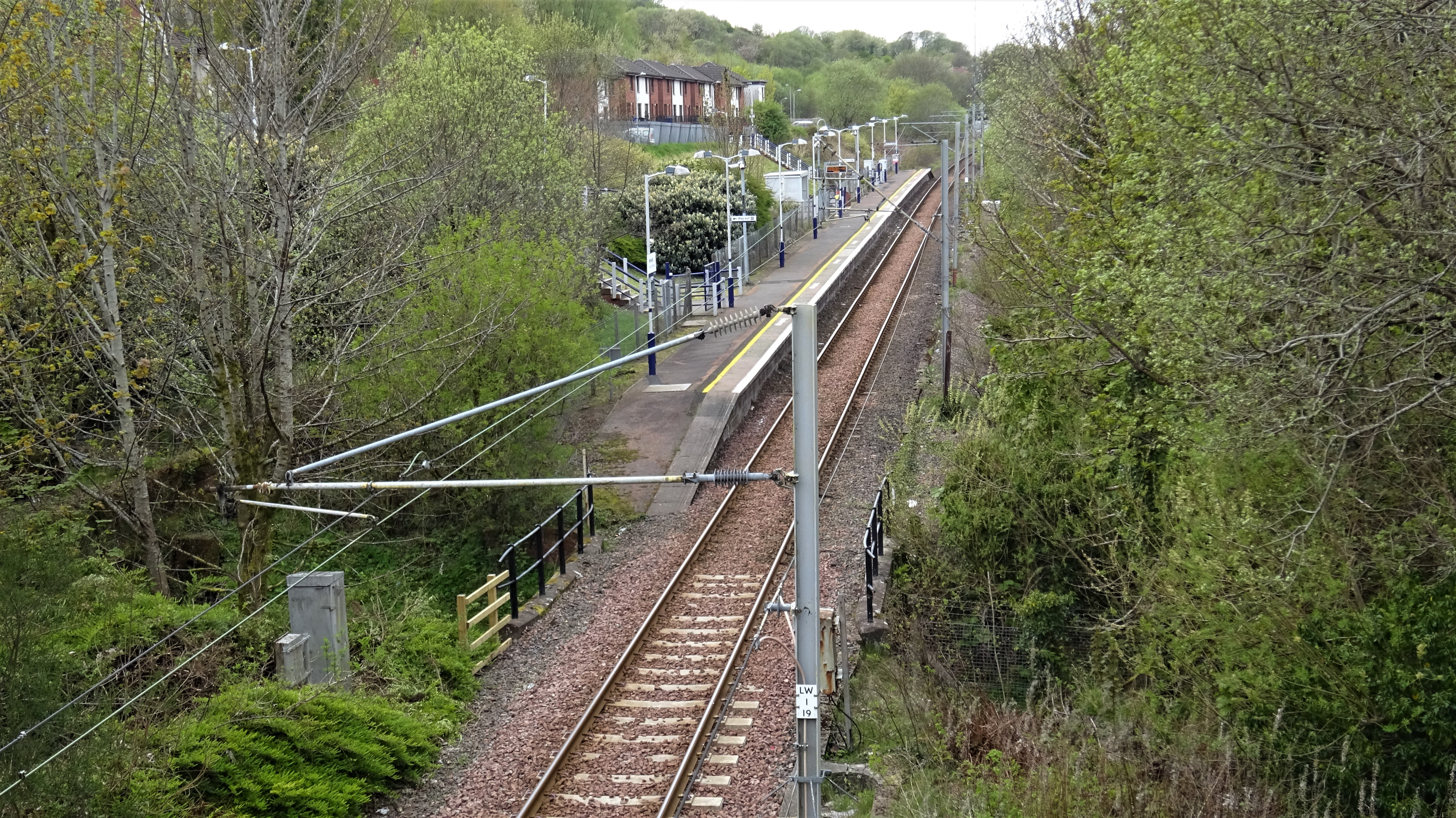
- View west towards Drumfrochar

General information
- Location: Greenock, Inverclyde; Scotland
- Coordinates: 55.9384°N 4.7466°W
- Grid reference: NS285751
- Manager: ScotRail
- Platforms: 1

Other information
- Station code: WNL

Key dates
- 14 May 1990: Opened

Passengers
- 2021/22: ▲22,292
- 2022/23: ▲27,304
- 2023/24: ▲38,220
- 2024/25: ▲43,124
- 2025/26: ▲46,942
Location
Notes
- Passenger statistics from the Office of Rail and Road

Whinhill railway station is a railway station located in the east of the town of Greenock, Inverclyde, Scotland. The station is managed by ScotRail and is on the Inverclyde Line, 2 1/4 miles (3.6 km) from Port Glasgow and 22 1/2 miles (36.2 km) from Glasgow Central.

Opened in 1990, it is one of the newer stations on the line constructed by British Rail. Its opening made the line available to users in the south-east of Greenock for the first time in almost thirty years, since the closure of Upper Greenock station.

== Services ==
The typical off-peak service in trains per hour is:

- 2 tph to Glasgow Central via Paisley Gilmour Street
- 2 tph to Wemyss Bay

This service is reduced to hourly during the evenings, and on Sundays.

Preceding station	National Rail	Following station
Drumfrochar	ScotRail; Inverclyde Line	Port Glasgow
