= IBM railway station =

Disused railway station in Inverclyde, Scotland

IBM
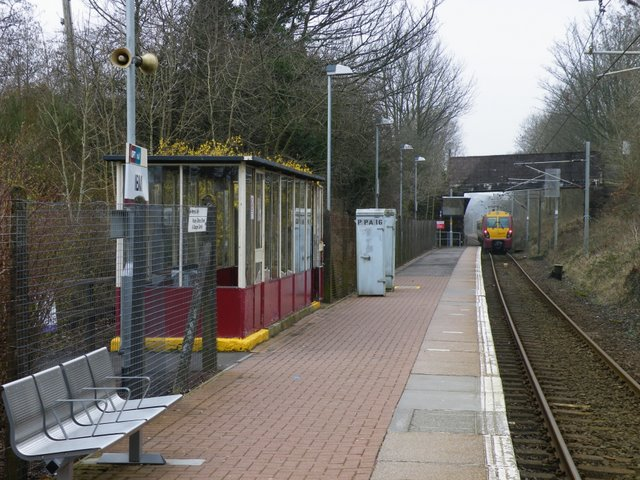
- The platform of the former IBM station in 2009

General information
- Location: Greenock, Inverclyde; Scotland
- Coordinates: 55.9295°N 4.8271°W
- Grid reference: NS234743
- Platforms: 1

Other information
- Status: Services suspended
- Station code: IBM

History
- Original company: Scottish Region of British Railways

Key dates
- 9 May 1978: Opened as I B M Halt - unadvertised
- 16 May 1983: Renamed I B M - unadvertised
- 12 May 1986: I B M became publicly advertised
- 8 December 2018: Last usage prior to services being suspended

Passengers
- 2014/15: ▼47,376
- 2015/16: ▼22,016
- 2016/17: ▼6,032
- 2017/18: ▼768
- 2018/19: ▼506
- ^: Services Suspended
Location
Notes
- Passenger statistics from the Office of Rail and Road

IBM railway station (formerly known as IBM Halt) is a disused railway station on the Inverclyde Line, 5 miles 22 chains (8.5 km) west of Wemyss Bay Junction at Port Glasgow, and approximately 25 miles (40 km) west of Glasgow Central. It is one of a number of railway stations which remain open but have no passenger services.

== History ==
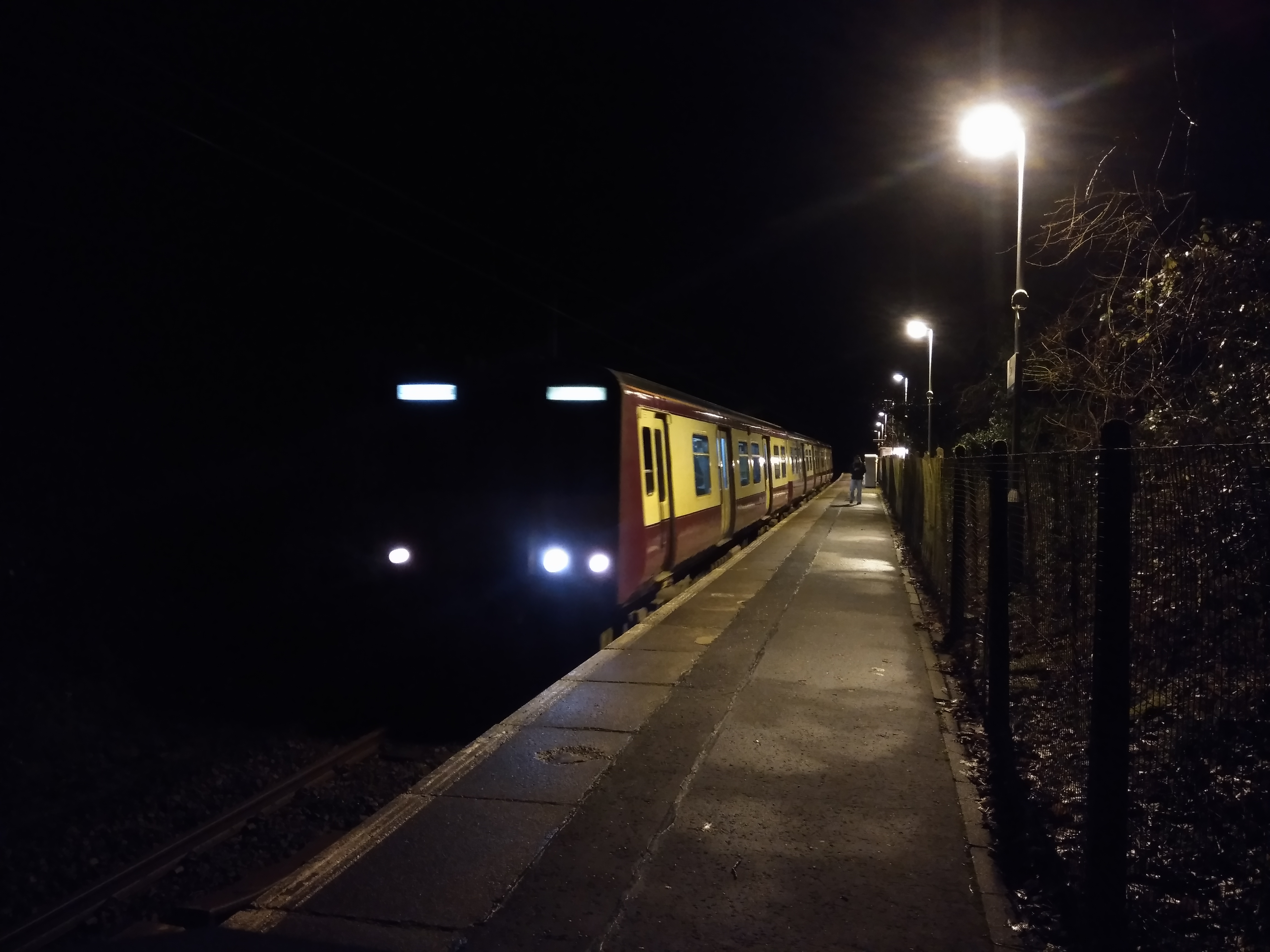
314216 arrives at IBM on 8 December 2018 forming the 23:48 service to Glasgow Central. This was the last passenger service to stop at the station.

Clinging to the south slope of Spango Valley on the Glasgow-Wemyss Bay line, IBM Halt was opened on 9 May 1978 by British Rail to serve what was at that time a thriving IBM computer manufacturing plant, employing over 4,000 people. Originally, the stop was unadvertised and only peak-time services stopped there, but subsequently the station was publicly advertised from May 1986.

The station was located within the confines of a large facility formerly owned entirely by IBM, a major employer for the town of Greenock until the plant closed. By June 2009, half of the buildings had been demolished, and the site was re-branded as Valley Park.

Until 16 May 1983, it was the only station to have the suffix "halt". By 1974, the term "halt" had been removed from British Rail timetables, station signs, and other official documents. The return of the term came in 1978 for the opening of IBM Halt, and in the renaming of the two Cornish stations in 2008.

=== Service suspension ===
The station had its service suspended with effect from 9 December 2018, with ScotRail citing low patronage and anti-social behaviour on the nearby derelict IBM site. Services may be re-introduced once the site is rebuilt, although there is no fixed timeline for that to happen. A planning application for a mixed-use development on the IBM site, which would involve the reopening of the station, was submitted in February 2020.

== Passenger volume ==
Due to its location away from major housing areas and other transport links, the station was used primarily by people employed in Valley Park, but access to the station by the general public was possible. Despite an hourly service, the annual patronage declined dramatically, from well over 100,000, to about 500 when the services were suspended.

Passenger Volume at IBM
	2002–03	2004–05	2005–06	2006–07	2007–08	2008–09	2009–10	2010–11	2011–12	2012–13	2013–14	2014–15	2015–16	2016–17	2017–18	2018–19
Entries and exits	94,462	128,741	117,359	93,954	93,519	153,358	145,664	136,414	127,828	122,590	71,128	47,376	22,016	6,032	768	506

The statistics cover twelve month periods that start in April.

== Services ==
Prior to the suspension of services, the station was served by an hourly service on the Inverclyde Line between Glasgow Central and Wemyss Bay.

Preceding station	National Rail	Following station
Inverkip	ScotRail; Inverclyde Line (Service suspended)	Branchton

== Bibliography ==
- Quick, Michael (2023). Railway Passenger Stations in Great Britain: A Chronology (PDF) (5th ed.). London: Railway and Canal Historical Society.
