= Upper Greenock railway station =

Former railway station in Scotland

Upper Greenock
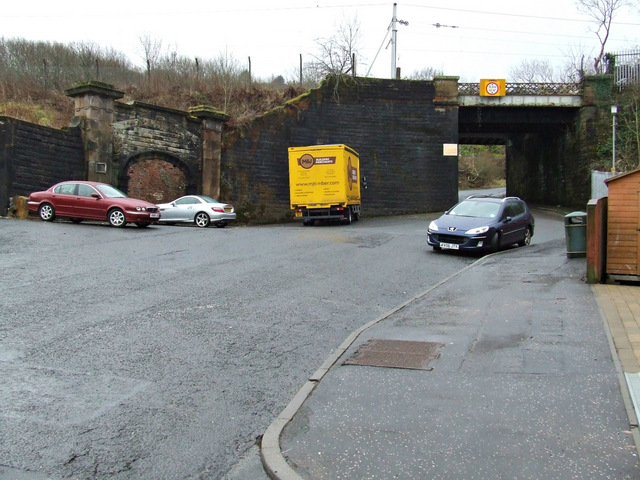
- The bricked-up entrance to the old Upper Greenock station.

General information
- Location: Greenock, Inverclyde; Scotland
- Coordinates: 55.940°N 4.758°W
- Platforms: 2

Other information
- Status: Disused

History
- Original company: Greenock and Wemyss Bay Railway
- Pre-grouping: Caledonian Railway
- Post-grouping: LMS

Key dates
- 15 May 1865: Opened
- 5 June 1967: Closed
Location

Upper Greenock railway station was a railway station serving the town of Greenock, Inverclyde, Scotland, originally as part of the Greenock and Wemyss Bay Railway and later owned by the Caledonian Railway.

== History ==
The station opened on 15 May 1865 and closed permanently on 5 June 1967. The station was directly replaced by Branchton station, approximately 2.8 km west.

== Gallery ==
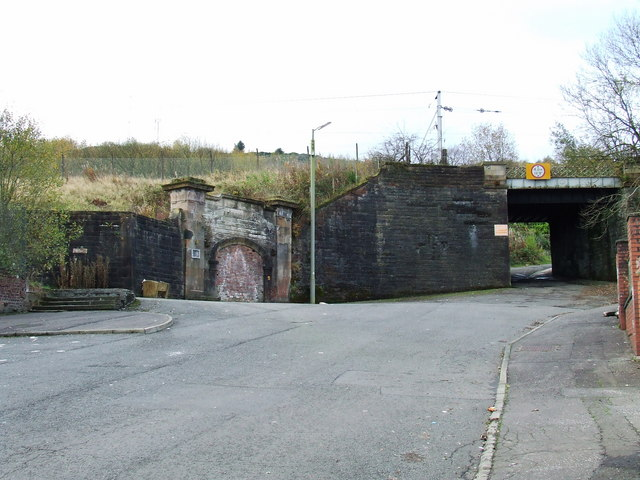
The station was located at the top of Lynedoch Street

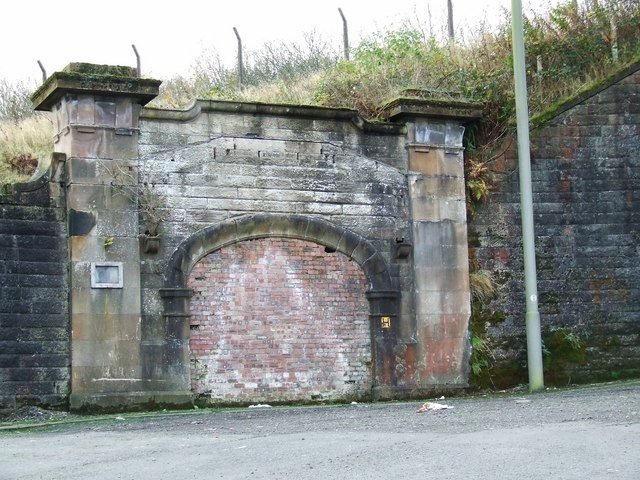
The bricked-up entrance on Lynedoch Street

Preceding station	Historical railways	Following station
Ravenscraig; Line open; station closed	Caledonian Railway; Greenock and Wemyss Bay Railway	Port Glasgow; Line and station open
