= Drumfrochar railway station =

Railway station in Inverclyde, Scotland

Drumfrochar Scottish Gaelic: Druim Fhraochair
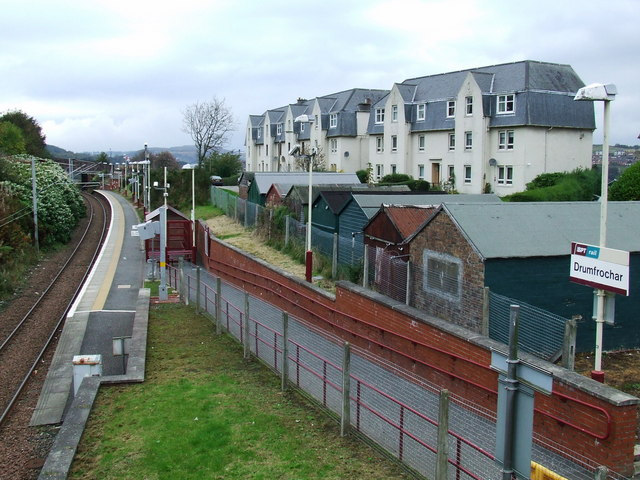
- Drumfrochar station, looking west towards Wemyss Bay in October 2007

General information
- Location: Greenock, Inverclyde; Scotland, United Kingdom
- Coordinates: 55.9412°N 4.7723°W
- Grid reference: NS269754
- Manager: ScotRail
- Platforms: 1

Other information
- Station code: DFR

Key dates
- 24 May 1998: Opened

Passengers
- 2021/22: ▲32,924
- 2022/23: ▲46,980
- 2023/24: ▲65,562
- 2024/25: ▲71,638
- 2025/26: ▲74,286
Location
Notes
- Passenger statistics from the Office of Rail and Road

Drumfrochar railway station is a railway station located in a residential district in the south-western part of Greenock, Scotland. The station is managed by ScotRail and is on the Inverclyde Line, 23 miles (37 km) west of Glasgow Central.

Upon exiting the station to the west, one is confronted with panoramic views over the south-west of the town, including Greenock prison.

Opened on 24 May 1998, it is the newest station on the line.

The station is on the site of the Greenock rail crash in 1994.

== Services ==
The typical off-peak service in trains per hour is:

- 2 tph to Glasgow Central via Paisley Gilmour Street
- 2 tph to Wemyss Bay

This service is reduced to hourly during the evenings, and on Sundays

Preceding station	National Rail	Following station
Branchton	ScotRail; Inverclyde Line	Whinhill

== Gallery ==
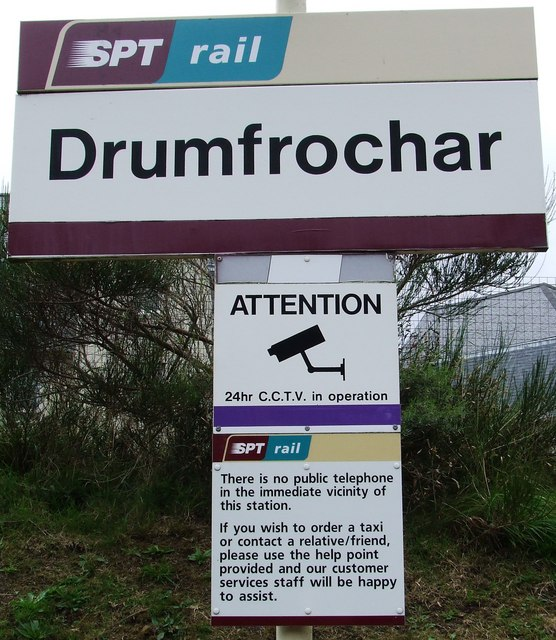
Drumfrochar station signs

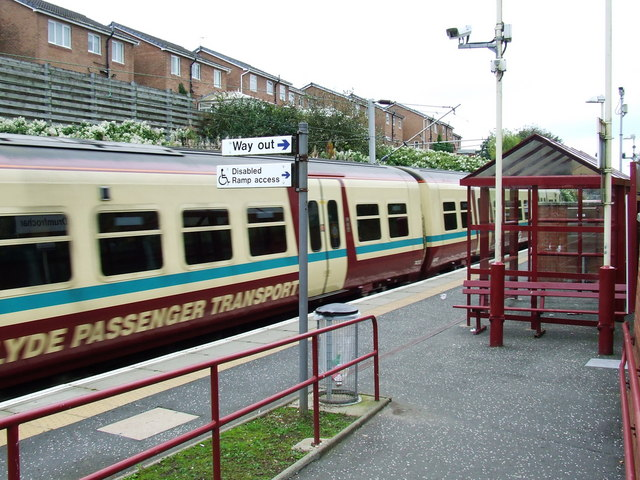
A Glasgow bound train is just leaving

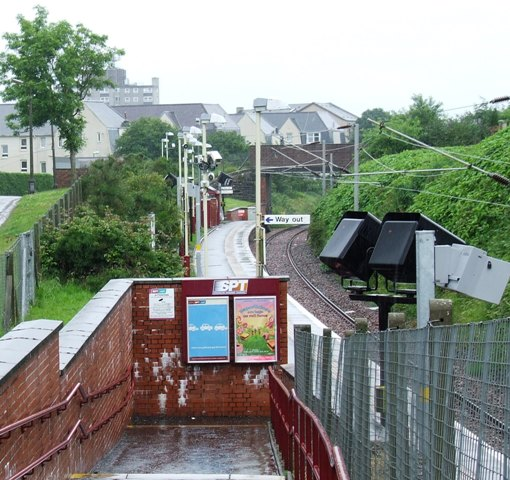
Drumfrochar station, looking east towards Glasgow
