= Branchton =

Coordinates: 55°56′16″N 4°48′27″W

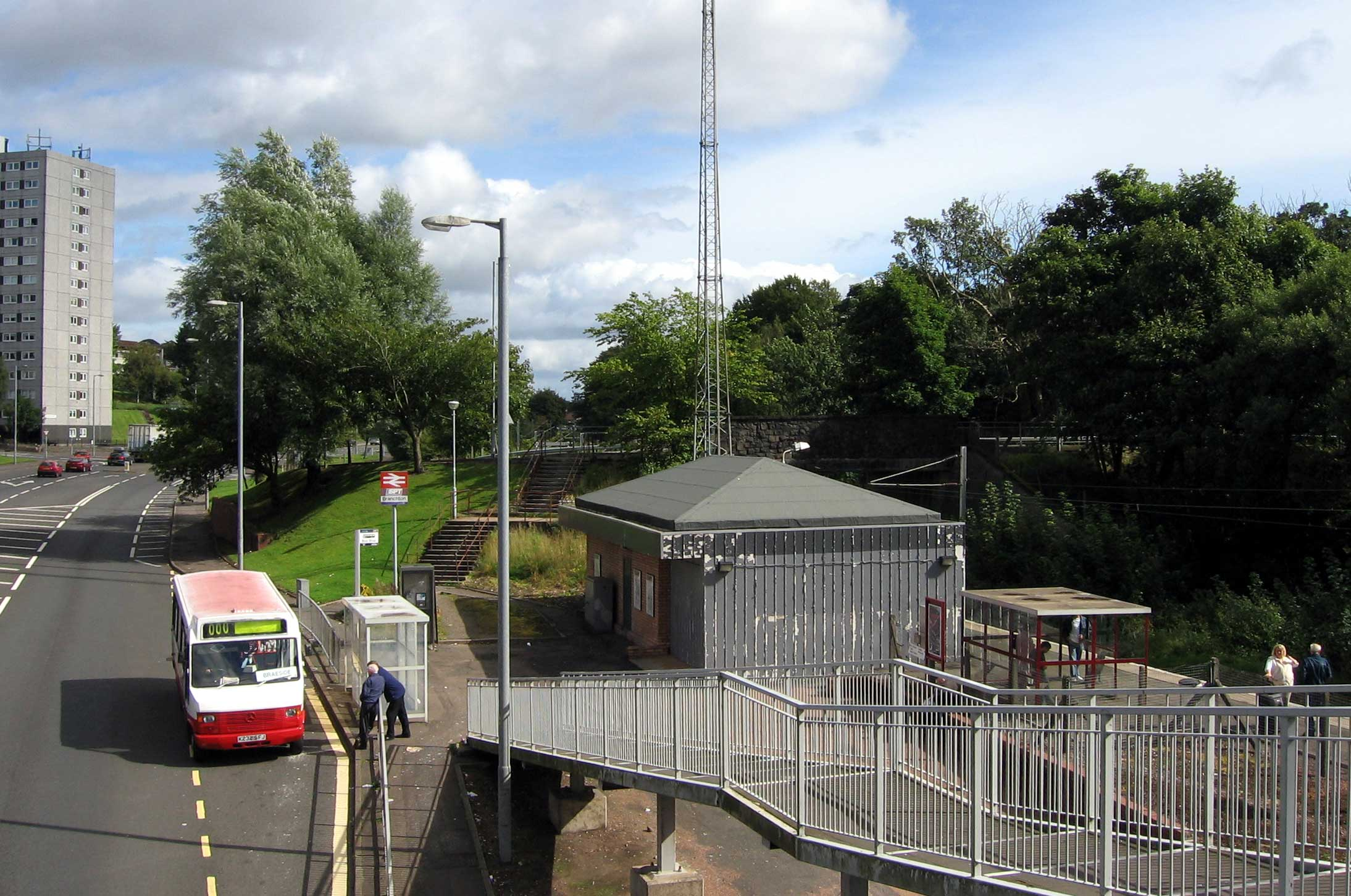
Branchton station, seen in front of the road embankment.

Branchton (Scots: Branchtoun, Scottish Gaelic: Brainsdean) is an area of the town of Greenock, in Inverclyde, Scotland. Tenements used to dominate the area, which acquired a reputation as socially disadvantaged, but a recent cash injection means that the area is being redeveloped with new housing and community projects.

Branchton railway station is on the Wemyss Bay to Glasgow Central line. The road up to the Branchton houses from the main A78 Inverkip road rises up an embankment and over a railway bridge just to the north of the station.
