= Greenock rail crash =

Railway accident caused by sabotage

Coordinates: 55.94105°N 4.77365°W

Details
- Date: 25 June 1994; 23:00
- Location: near Drumfrochar railway station, Greenock
- Country: Scotland
- Line: Inverclyde Line (Strathclyde Passenger Transport)
- Operator: ScotRail
- Cause: Vandalism

Statistics
- Trains: 1
- Passengers: 4
- Crew: 2
- Deaths: 2

On 25 June 1994, the 22:45 from Wemyss Bay to Glasgow, in Scotland, derailed and smashed into a bridge after hitting concrete blocks placed deliberately on the railway by vandals outside of where Drumfrochar railway station would be opened four years later.

The train involved was a refurbished Class 303 Electric Multiple Unit. The concrete blocks were cable-trough covers, which were placed across the rails of the single-track line by two vandals who had climbed down to the railway to urinate on their way home. The railway at this point is on a curve, going to the right as the train was travelling.

The leading bogie of the EMU derailed and the train immediately collided with the solid structure of the overbridge, crushing the driver's cab, killing driver Arthur McKee, 35, and also killing passenger Alan Nicol, 21, who was seated immediately behind the cab, with his back to the partition. Nicol had taken this location to reduce the risk of injury from broken glass should the train be stoned by vandals, which was a common occurrence in that area. Including the two trainstaff, the train was carrying six people.

Following the tragedy, many youths in the surrounding area were questioned by police regarding the incident. After a trial by the High Court, Gary Dougan and Craig Houston, two 17-year-olds from Greenock were each imprisoned for 15 years for culpable homicide. Dougan and Houston launched an appeal against their convictions two years later. In September 1996, the Court of Appeal in Edinburgh upheld both convictions.
