= Ravenscraig railway station =

Disused railway station in Inverclyde, Scotland

Ravenscraig
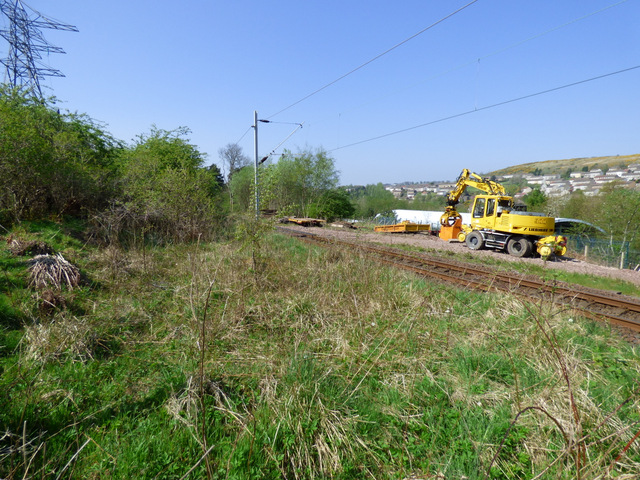
- The site of Ravenscraig station in 2016.

General information
- Location: Near Greenock, Inverclyde; Scotland
- Coordinates: 55.936°N 4.813°W
- Platforms: 1

Other information
- Status: Disused

History
- Original company: Greenock and Wemyss Bay Railway
- Pre-grouping: Caledonian Railway
- Post-grouping: LMS

Key dates
- 15 May 1865: Opened
- 1 January 1917: Closed
- 1 February 1919: Reopened
- 1 February 1944: Closed
Location

Ravenscraig railway station was a railway station located south west of the town of Greenock, Inverclyde, Scotland, originally as part of the Greenock and Wemyss Bay Railway and later owned by the Caledonian Railway.

The Greenock suburbs now border the site of the station, but When the station opened in 1865, the area was entirely farmland, the nearest suburb being 1.5 miles (2.4 km) away at Cornhaddock. Even when the station closed in 1944, it was still some distance from the nearest suburb, which was 1.0 mile (1.6 km) away at Gateside.

Smithston Poorhouse and Asylum opened in 1879, this was located around 0.7 miles (1.1 km) from the station as the crow flies. It was renamed Ravenscraig Hospital when it came under NHS control in 1948. This was four years after the station closed, therefore the name of the station and that of the hospital are not directly connected.

== History ==
The station opened on 15 May 1865 and closed permanently on 1 February 1944.

== Gallery ==
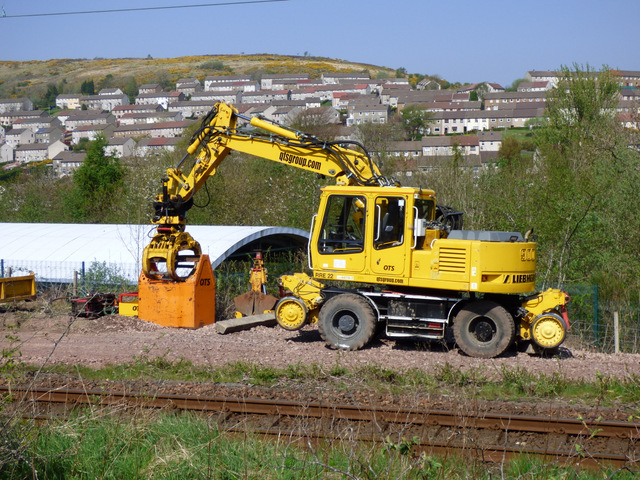
The yellow machine is standing where the siding was located (May 2016)

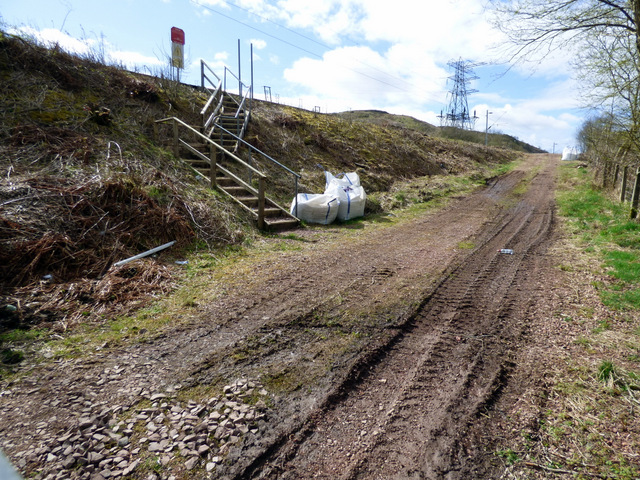
The siding was located at the top of this path (April 2016)

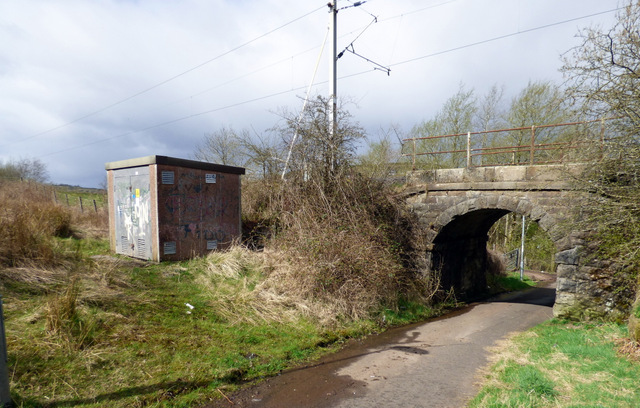
The platform was located to the left of the more recent building (April 2016)

Preceding station	Historical railways	Following station
Inverkip; Line open; station open	Caledonian Railway; Greenock and Wemyss Bay Railway	Upper Greenock; Line open; station closed
