= Inverkip railway station =

Railway station in Inverclyde, Scotland

Inverkip Scottish Gaelic: Inbhir Chip
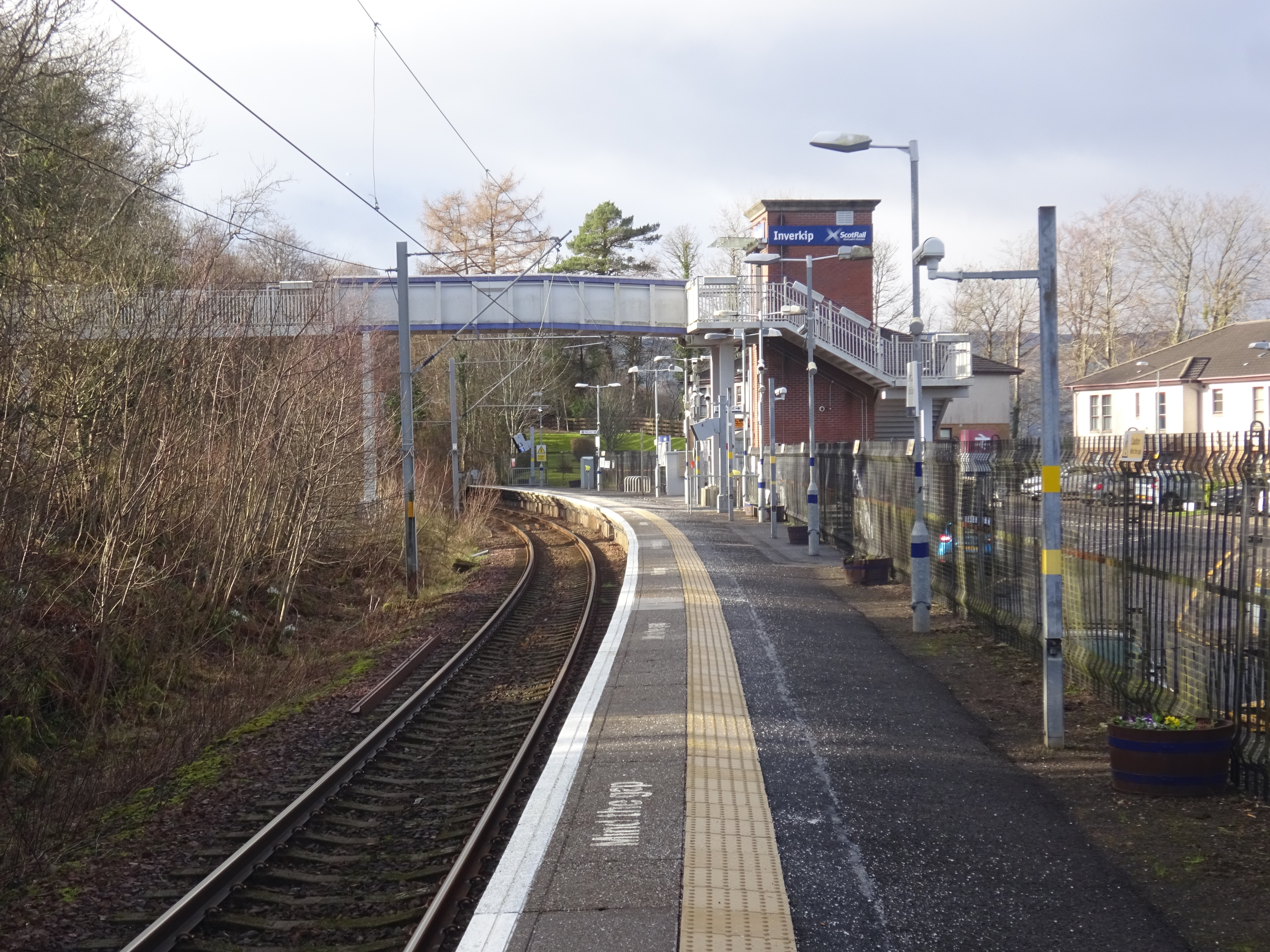
- View west towards Wemyss Bay

General information
- Location: Inverkip, Inverclyde; Scotland
- Coordinates: 55.9060°N 4.8724°W
- Grid reference: NS205718
- Manager: ScotRail
- Platforms: 1

Other information
- Station code: INP

Passengers
- 2021/22: ▲39,516
- 2022/23: ▲57,690
- 2023/24: ▲73,212
- 2024/25: ▲82,900
- 2025/26: ▲92,684
Location
Notes
- Passenger statistics from the Office of Rail and Road

Inverkip railway station serves the village of Inverkip, Inverclyde, Scotland. The station is managed by ScotRail and is on the Inverclyde Line, located 28 3/4 miles (46.3 km) west of Glasgow Central.

== History ==
The embankment is all that remains of the former down platform. All of the station buildings have now been removed and replaced with a bus shelter. The flats at the station, known as The Kyles, are built in what was the station goods yard. There was also a coal yard located in this area. Inverkip also had its own signal box, located at the end of the down platform. A camping coach was positioned here by the Scottish Region from 1959 to 1969; from 1963, it was a Pullman camping coach. At the further end of the yard area, where the housing development is located, are the parapets of a metal overbridge, presumably used to move goods across from the up platform.

The station, built in 1865, was substantially modified in 2012 to accommodate the erection of a footbridge with an integrated lift. This structure was required as a planning permission clause related to the construction of a new housing estate in the fields across the line from the station. It was not possible to fit a ramped bridge in the available space, hence the need for a lift, making Inverkip one of the few unstaffed stations in Scotland to have a lift (other examples can be found at Prestwick International Airport) The shelter was replaced and relocated further west and the steps from station Avenue were relocated slightly further east. Temporary steps were put in place during the year-long construction project. The lift serves the platform level and the footbridge level. Strangely, it is necessary to exit the station in order to access the steps to the footbridge since there are no steps directly from the platform to the bridge. There are no steps to the bridge on the other side of the line due to the steep embankment there.

Groundworks for the footbridge started in 2011, with the main span being lifted into place in the early hours of 15 July 2012; the bridge was formally opened in December 2012. A Park & Ride car park with 26 spaces was also opened across the line from the station at that time.

== Services ==
The station is served by Class 318s, Class 320s, Class 380s and Class 385s.

The typical off-peak service in trains per hour is:

- 2 tph to Glasgow Central via Paisley Gilmour Street
- 2 tph to Wemyss Bay

This service is reduced to hourly during the evenings, and on Sundays

Preceding station	National Rail	Following station
Wemyss Bay	ScotRail; Inverclyde Line	Branchton
	Historical railways	
Wemyss Bay; Line and station open	Caledonian Railway; Greenock and Wemyss Bay Railway	Ravenscraig; Line open; station closed

== Gallery ==
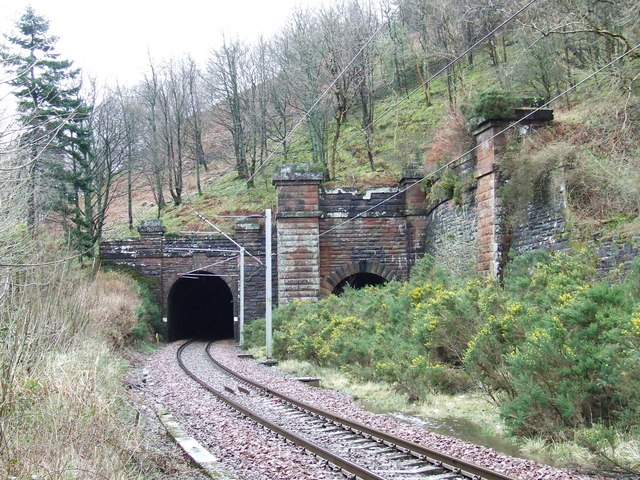
The western end of the tunnels which run beneath the steeply sloped Commoncraig. The tunnel on the right has been out of use since electrification of the Wemyss Bay line in 1966.

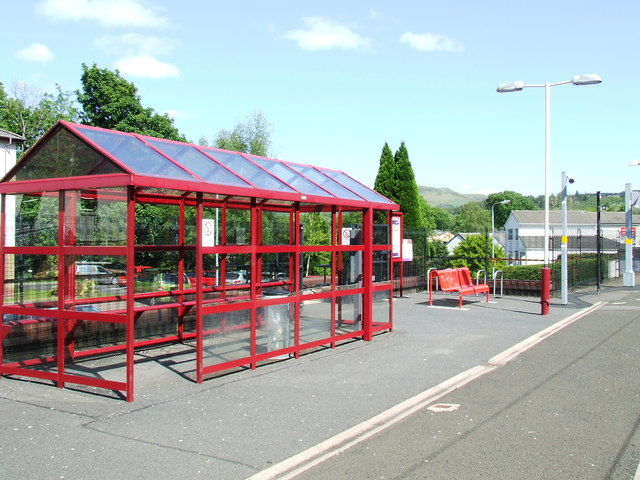
This was once a fairly grand station with two platforms, substantial buildings and a goods yard. It is now reduced to one platform with bus shelter. Dunrod Hill is visible in the distance, beyond the trees.

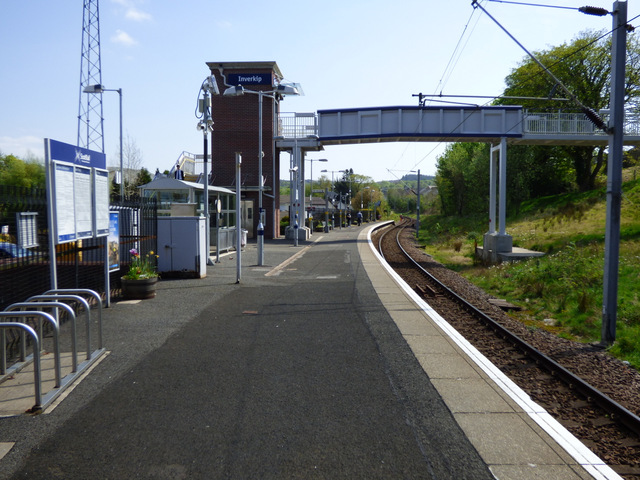
View past the footbridge towards the former IBM Halt.

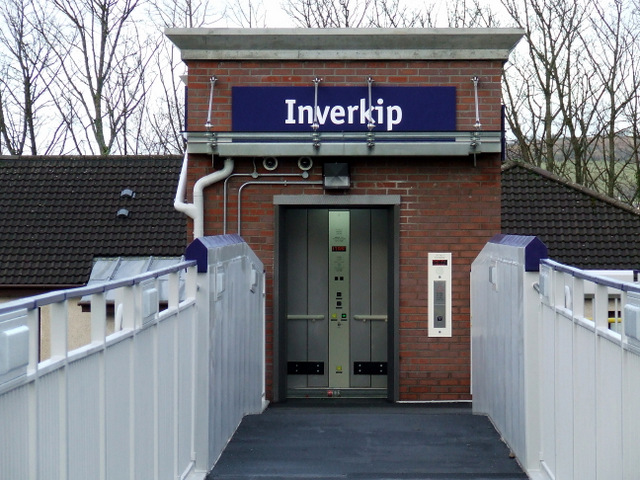
The lift at footbridge deck level.

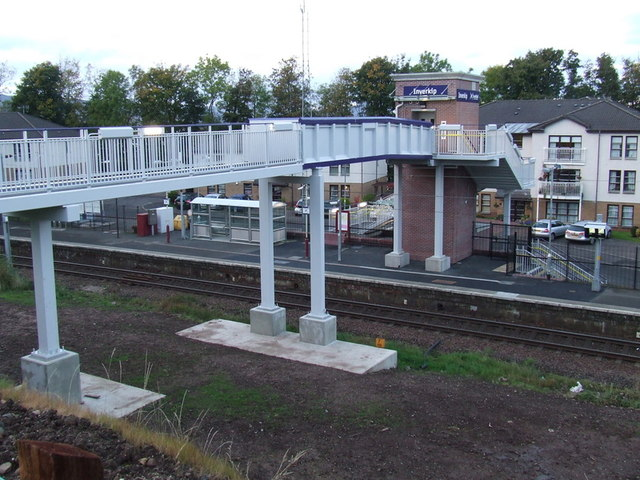
Looking across the line to the station from Lochans Drive.
