= Greenock and Wemyss Bay Railway =

Former railway line in Scotland

Overview
- Locale: Scotland
- Dates of operation: 17 July 1862–1 August 1893
- Successor: Caledonian Railway

Technical
- Track gauge: 1,435 mm (4 ft 8 1/2 in)

The Greenock and Wemyss Bay Railway was a railway owned by the Caledonian Railway, providing services between Greenock and Wemyss Bay.

== History ==
=== The Glasgow, Paisley and Greenock Railway ===
In 1841 the Glasgow, Paisley and Greenock Railway opened its line. At the time the River Clyde was heavily used by Clyde steamers, but it was impassable for larger sea-going vessels, which anchored at the Tail of the Bank for transshipment at Greenock, and transfer of passengers.

The company's promoters anticipated the carriage of goods from the industries of Greenock, and as well as competing for the transshipment traffic. However their terminal station at Greenock Cathcart Street, around 300 yards (280 m) from Custom House Quay, and was not directly connected to any shipping berth.

Nonetheless substantial traffic built up, and in particular passenger traffic grew considerably. The traffic to resort locations on the Firth of Clyde and other coastal places, was especially encouraging, and the steamer trade became lucrative.

The throughout journey time—rail and ship—was considered critical. As a pioneer railway, the Greenock company had not given thought to this, but slowly the disadvantage of the Greenock station became more prominent. The walk from the railway station to the Quay was through squalid streets, and the steamer transit to the lower Clyde involved a circuit round Kempock Point and Cloch Point to reach the seaway.

In 1851 the Glasgow, Paisley and Greenock Railway was absorbed by the dominant Caledonian Railway.

=== The Wemyss Bay Railway ===
Greenock and Wemyss Bay Railway Act 1862
- Act of Parliament
- Parliament of the United Kingdom
- Long title: An Act for making a Railway from the Glasgow, Paisley, and Greenock Railway to Wemyss Bay in the County of Renfrew, and a Pier and Roads in connexion therewith; and for other Purposes.
- Citation: 25 & 26 Vict. c. clx

Dates
- Royal assent: 17 July 1862

Text of statute as originally enacted

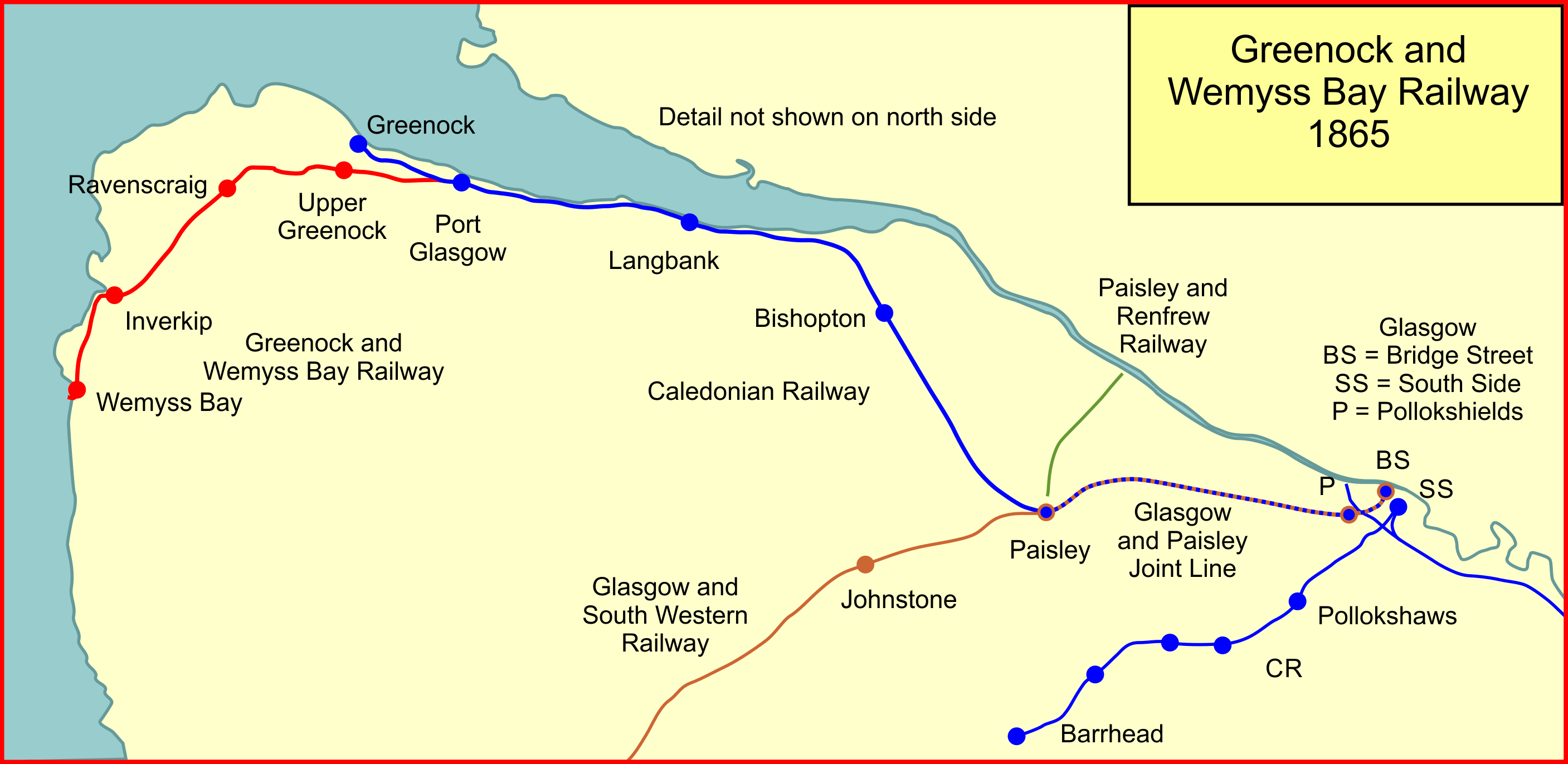
The Greenock and Wemyss Bay Railway network in 1865

Rothesay assumed dominance as the resort destination of choice, and many businesspeople in Glasgow kept residences there, travelling weekly to their places of business in the city. Promoters saw that a railway link to Wemyss Bay would be ideal, as the pier they lay directly opposite Rothesay, and on 17 July 1862 they obtained the Greenock and Wemyss Bay Railway Act 1862 (25 & 26 Vict. c. clx) giving authorisation for the Greenock and Wemyss Bay Railway. Their line was to form a junction with the Greenock line a short distance west of Port Glasgow station; it would then climb and run round to the south of Greenock, then following the valley of the Spango Burn to a station on the hillside above Inverkip, then turning south to a pier station at Wemyss Bay. Lands were acquired speculatively at Upper Greenock for industrial development.

The line was opened to traffic on 15 May 1865.

=== Difficult early years ===
The railway was worked by the Caledonian Railway, which operated through passenger trains from the Bridge Street station in Glasgow. An independent Wemyss Bay Steamboat Company Limited operated steamers in connection with the trains. However this meant that the railway company was dependent on two other concerns for the conduct of its business, and reliability problems on the railway and in operating the steamers led to a poor reputation. After four years, the Wemyss Bay Steamboat Company failed (in 1869), and the Rothesay connections, on which the Wemyss Bay Railway relied, were made by other steamer operators as part of their wider network of routes.

To add to the difficulties, the industrial development confidently expected at Upper Greenock failed to materialise, and the lands acquired there were sold off at a loss.

=== A new steamboat operator ===
However the steamboat connection was taken up by Captain James Gillies and Captain Alexander Campbell, who took over the liquidated steamboat company's fleet, and built the service up with high levels of comfort and service, with extremely low fares. Once again the railway company found itself subordinate to the activities of other parties: the Caledonian Railway and Captain Campbell's operation agreed the low fares—for some time the return fare was half a crown—and the Wemyss Bay Railway was not consulted. The half crown fare was exceedingly popular, however, and carryings, and profits, on the route escalated considerably.

At this time, the Greenock and Ayrshire Railway opened a new line to Albert Harbour in Greenock; the company was allied to the Glasgow and South Western Railway, and the Albert Harbour station was adjacent to the steamer berths; the new entrant was severe competition for the Caledonian Railway's Greenock operation, and for a time there was cut-throat competition with ruinous fare reductions there, until a traffic pooling agreement was finalised in 1871.

From 1869 the Caledonian was considering extending its line to Gourock, but opposition frustrated these wishes, and in the meantime Wemyss Bay was an attractive route. (The Caledonian opened an extension to Gourock in 1889.)

The Greenock and Wemyss Bay Railway was able to pay its first dividend, a remarkable 5½%, in 1878.

=== Absorbed by the Caledonian ===
For some years the relationship between the Wemyss Bay company and the Caledonian had been prickly, the smaller company believing that its interests were not being taken into account. In January 1887 the Wemyss Bay company applied to the Railway and Canal Commissioners to compel the Caledonian to transfer their trains to Glasgow Central station: at that time they were still using the less convenient (to the public) Bridge Street; but the application failed. (Bridge Street continued to be used for Caledonian operations from the Paisley direction until 1905. The more stable financial situation enabled more harmonious working, and the disadvantageous circumstances of the Caledonian's operation at Greenock made the Wemyss Bay route more attractive to them. Widespread talk of amalgamation was put into effect: in August 1899 the Glasgow Herald announced that the Wemyss Bay company was to be absorbed. In fact the announcement was premature, but the agreement to amalgamate had been finalised, and from this time the two companies co-operated more fully. The actual amalgamation was authorised by an act of Parliament on 27 July 1893, and took effect on 1 August 1893.

Work was immediately put in hand to improve the line, and to rebuild Wemyss Bay station, as well as Inverkip and Upper Greenock. Nock observes that the station was rebuilt to an exceptionally pleasing design with a light glass canopy to the circulating area; the pier could accommodate five steamers at once. He goes on

At Wemyss Bay ... quite apart from the beauty of the station itself, the traffic facilities provided in the reconstruction of 1900 are remarkable in themselves. The enterprising timetables of the day required that a train and a steamer should arrive simultaneously, and exchange passengers. Although the changeover did not need to be done at the lightning speed demanded by the most competitive services at Gourock, there was to be no dawdling about. The station platforms, and the approach ways to the steamer berths, were therefore made exceptionally wide, so that two opposing streams of pedestrians could pass without interference. From the railway point of view, while the two long island platforms provided four platform faces for trains, a third line was laid in between the two island platforms to enable locomotives of incoming trains to be released immediately on arrival, and "run round" their trains.

The station had a purely decorative italianate clock tower. It opened on 7 December 1903; the architect was James Miller. The improvement works on the line between 1898 and 1907 cost the Caledonian Railway more than £267,000.

=== The Caledonian Steam Packet Company ===
The Caledonian Railway had long been dissatisfied with the service provided by independent steamer operators for the onward connections from its piers, and in 1889 it tried to obtain legal powers from Parliament to operate steamers itself. This was vigorously resisted by the steamboat operators, and was turned down by Parliament. The Caledonian established a nominally independent company, the Caledonian Steam Packet Company (CSPC), in May 1889.

=== Greenock Container Terminal ===
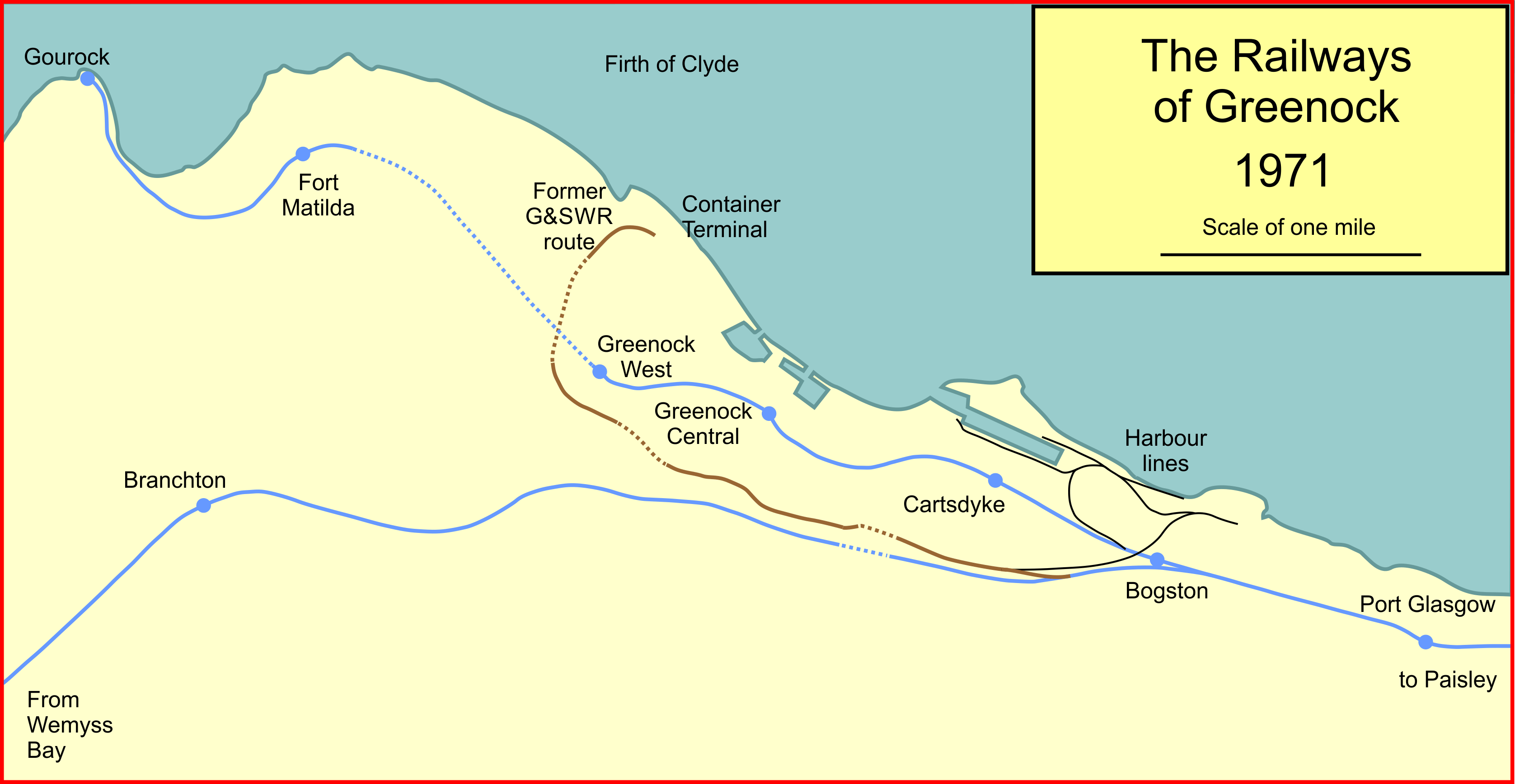
Greenock railways in 1971

The Greenock and Ayrshire Railway had reached Princes Pier in Greenock in 1869, but the line closed by 1969. In the following years an initiative was taken to develop the Princes Pier area for container ship operation; the Clyde Port Authority managed the development. The rail connection was reinstated in 1971 from the harbour. The original Greenock and Ayrshire route had crossed the Wemyss Bay line near Upper Greenock, and a connection was made from the G&AR line into the Wemyss Bay line at that point. The point of junction with the Wemyss Bay line was named Containerbase Junction.

The line was now single and laid in the centre of the tunnels, enabling 8 foot (2.44 m) containers to pass. In fact this did not prove a long-term opportunity, and rail movement became dormant for many years; containers in use were larger than the original 8-foot size, and cannot be moved through the tunnels, and the line was officially closed on 30 September 1991. However it remains available, but dormant.

== Electrification ==
In the early 1960s, electrification of suburban routes around Glasgow was being implemented, using the 25 kV AC overhead system. After several routes had been electrified, in October 1964 the Gourock and Wemyss Bay lines were authorised for treatment. The Glasgow and Paisley Joint Line was quadruple track, but was reduced to double track as part of the work, and the Wemyss Bay branch was mostly singled. There are many areas on the line where you can still see where the line was doubled. Most bridges can be seen to have abutments wide enough for two lines even although the steel bridges present today are single. Parallel tunnels exist at both Whinhill and Inverkip where one tunnel has been closed and the second tunnel was retrofitted for Electrification and remains in use today. A pair of viaducts existed in Inverkip. During Electrification the steel bridge to the north was removed but the supports that once carried the second line are very much still evident when walking up the Glen.

19 three-car units were ordered for the services, from Cravens, part of the Metro Cammell group; the units became Class 311. The electric train service started on 5 September 1967.

== The present day ==
Today, this line together with the former Glasgow, Paisley and Greenock Railway is fully operational as part of the Inverclyde Line, however several stations have closed and opened during its lifetime. There is no freight activity on the branch at the present (2019); the connection to the container terminal at Greenock (Containerbase Junction) remains in place but is dormant.

The passenger train service, branded as part of the Inverclyde Line is basically hourly on the line, running from and to Glasgow Central. There is a slight increase in frequency at peak periods, and on three occasions each day passenger trains cross at Dunrod.

The timetable for the line has been consistent for decades, even with the recent closure of the IBM railway station. The timetable has been left untouched as to allow for the potential re-opening of the station, should there be significant industrial redevelopment in the area.

== Topography ==
The line opened on 15 May 1865.

Stations shown in bold are open at the present day; locations in italic were not passenger stations.

- Wemyss Bay Junction; from Paisley to Greenock line;
- Containerbase Junction; for Greenock Container Terminal from 1971; now dormant;
- Cartsburn Tunnel; (310 yards, 283 m);
- **Whinhill**; opened 14 May 1990;
- Upper Greenock; closed 5 June 1967;
- **Drumfrochar**; opened 24 May 1998;
- **Branchton**; opened 5 June 1967;
- Ravenscraig; closed 1 January 1917; re-opened 2 June 1919; closed 1 February 1944;
- IBM Halt; opened 9 May 1978 but not advertised until 12 May 1986; Mothballed 9 December 2018 primarily due to the closure of the namesake IBM factory.
- **Inverkip**;
- Inverkip Tunnel; (200 yards, 183 m);
- **Wemyss Bay**.

There is a train length of double track on the branch from Wemyss Bay Junction; it is used to hold a train for Wemyss Bay clear of the Greenock line, if the single line is occupied. There is a crossing loop at Dunrod, about a mile west of IBM Halt; and there are two platforms at Wemyss Bay; the remainder of the line is single track.

== Connections to other lines ==
- Glasgow, Paisley and Greenock Railway at Port Glasgow
