= Branchton railway station =

Railway station in Inverclyde, Scotland

Branchton
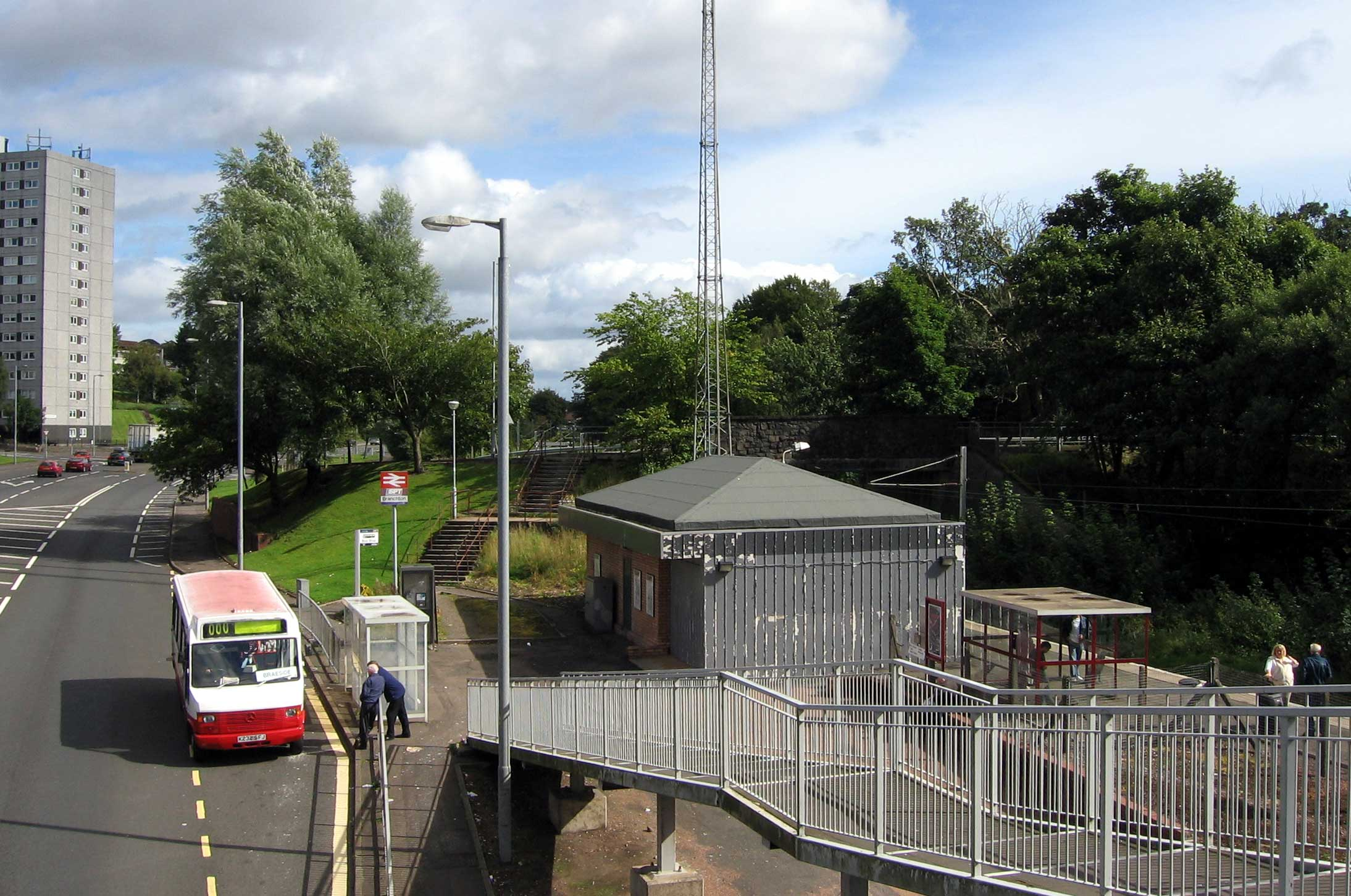
- View looking towards Greenock from footbridge over Inverkip Road

General information
- Location: Branchton, Inverclyde; Scotland
- Coordinates: 55.9404°N 4.8042°W
- Grid reference: NS250754
- Manager: ScotRail
- Platforms: 1

Other information
- Station code: BCN

History
- Original company: BR Scottish Region

Key dates
- 5 June 1967: Opened

Passengers
- 2021/22: ▲68,962
- 2022/23: ▲88,506
- 2023/24: ▲0.110 million
- 2024/25: ▲0.122 million
- 2025/26: ▲0.139 million
Location
Notes
- Passenger statistics from the Office of Rail and Road

Branchton railway station is a railway station in Scotland opened in 1967 under British Rail located in the south-west of the town of Greenock, beside the area called Branchton. The station is on the Inverclyde Line, 24 3/4 mi (40 km) west of Glasgow Central. The station is managed by ScotRail.

The station experienced severe flooding in December 2022.

== Services ==
The typical off-peak service in trains per hour is:

- 2 tph to Glasgow Central via Paisley Gilmour Street
- 2 tph to Wemyss Bay

This service is reduced to hourly during the evenings, and on Sundays

| Preceding station | National Rail | Following station |
|---|---|---|
| Inverkip | ScotRail; Inverclyde Line | Drumfrochar |

== Gallery ==
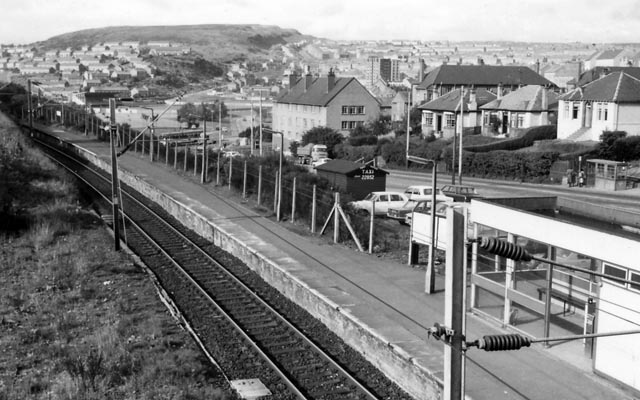
The station in 1974

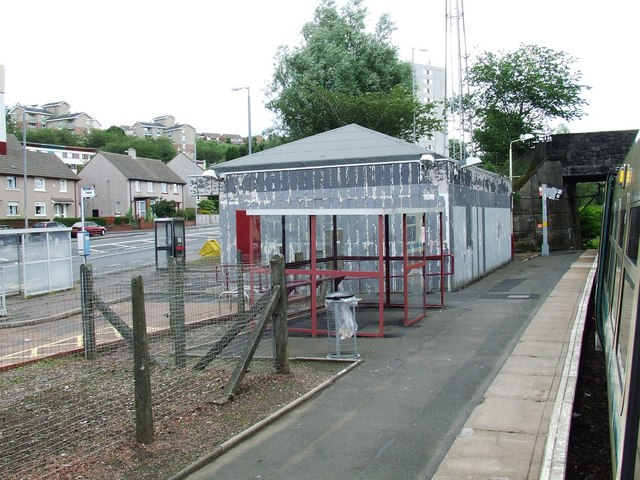
The station building had been unstaffed and boarded up for several years. It was boarded up shortly after being completely renovated, The station building was demolished in March 2015. Inverkip Road is to the left; Ravenscraig Court is obscured by the trees.

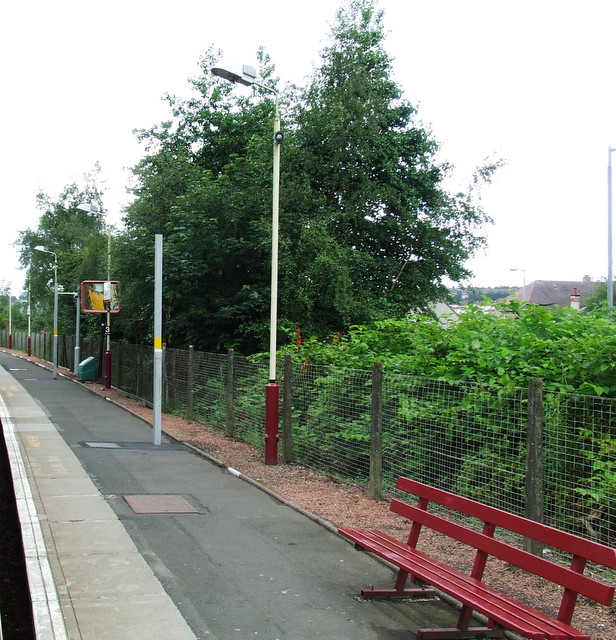
Looking down the platform, away from the station building. The posts with the yellow bands are for new CCTV equipment for use by train drivers.

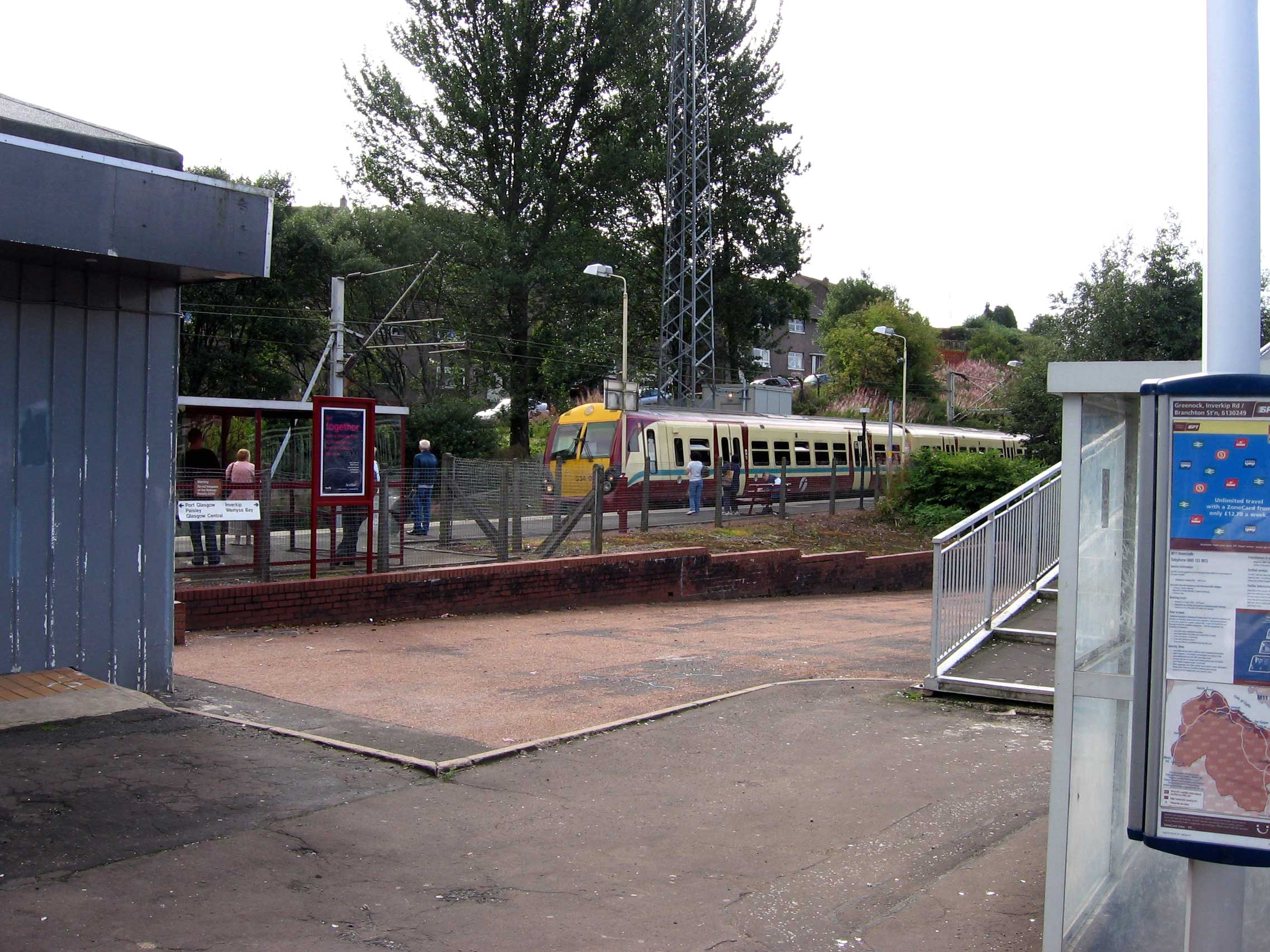
Eastbound Class 334 train arriving at the station
