= Wemyss Bay railway station =

Railway station in Inverclyde, Scotland

Wemyss Bay Scottish Gaelic: Bàgh Wemyss
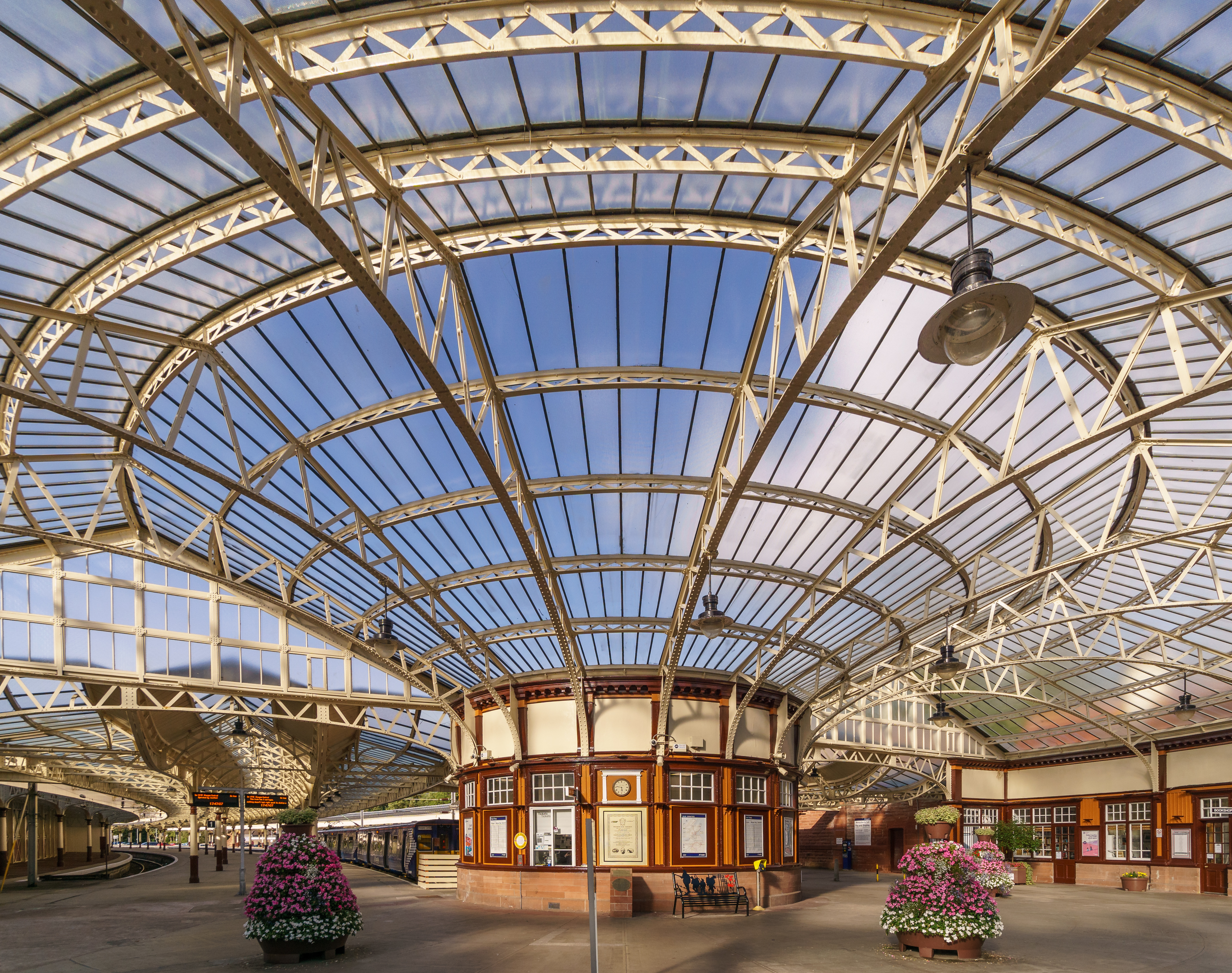
- Interior of the railway station, August 2018

General information
- Location: Wemyss Bay, Inverclyde; Scotland
- Coordinates: 55.8769°N 4.8891°W
- Grid reference: NS192685
- Manager: ScotRail
- Transit authority: SPT
- Platforms: 2

Other information
- Station code: WMS

History
- Original company: Greenock and Wemyss Bay Railway
- Pre-grouping: Caledonian Railway
- Post-grouping: LMS

Key dates
- 15 May 1865: Opened

Passengers
- 2021/22: ▲0.123 million
- 2022/23: ▲0.164 million
- 2023/24: ▲0.210 million
- 2024/25: ▲0.211 million
- 2025/26: ▲0.223 million

Listed Building – Category A
- Designated: 10 June 1971
- Reference no.: LB12473
Location
Notes
- Passenger statistics from the Office of Rail and Road

Wemyss Bay railway station serves the village of Wemyss Bay, Inverclyde, Scotland. The station is a terminus on the Inverclyde Line, about 26 miles (42 km) west of Glasgow Central. The station incorporates the Caledonian MacBrayne ferry terminal connecting mainland Scotland to Rothesay on the Isle of Bute. The station is managed by ScotRail.

In Britain's 100 Best Railway Stations by Simon Jenkins, the station was one of only ten to be awarded five stars, and was the station photographed on the front cover.

The station won the 2023 World Cup of Stations, organised by the Rail Delivery Group.

== History ==
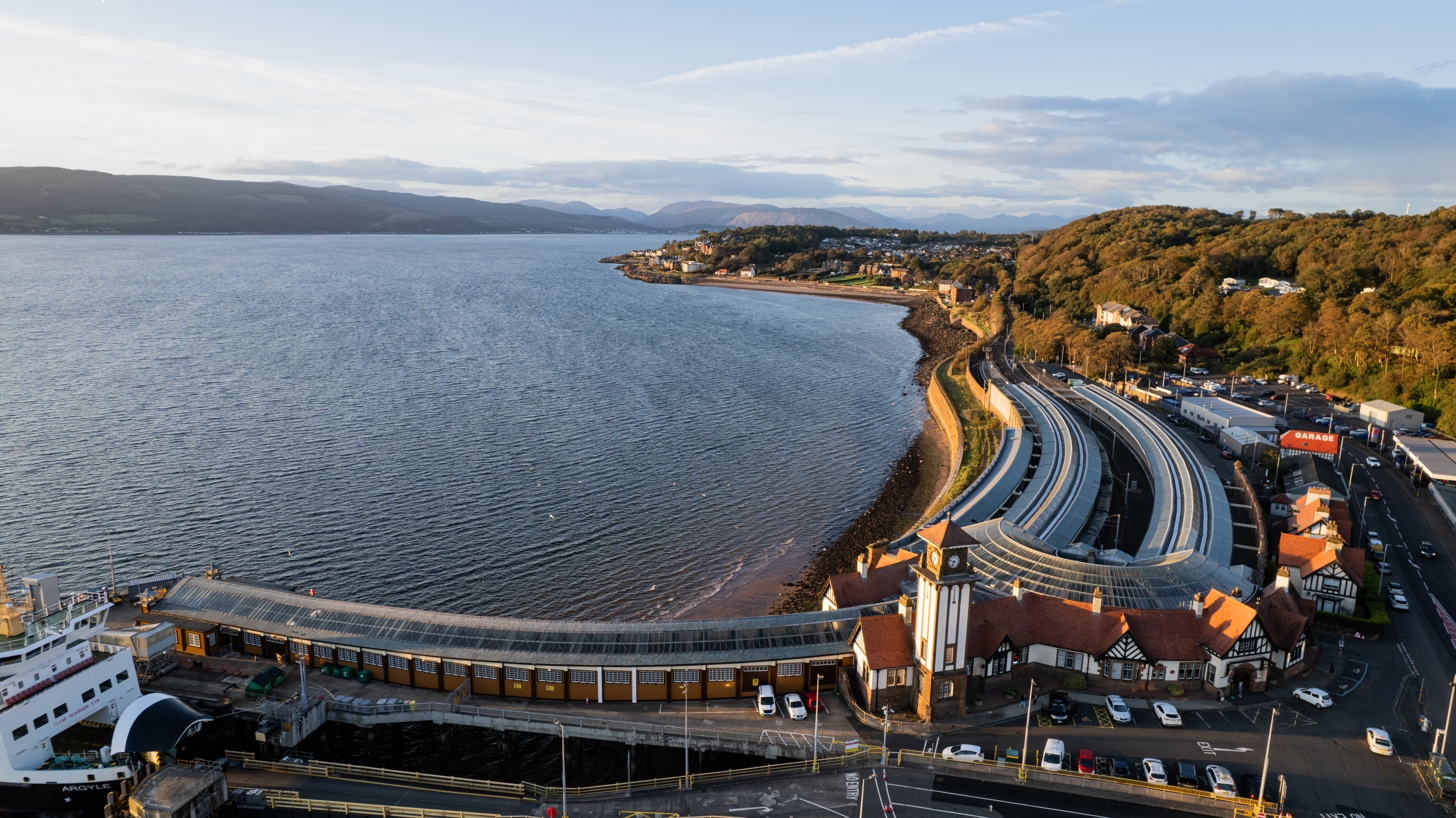
The station seen from above, September 2025

Work began in late 1862 on the single track Greenock and Wemyss Bay Railway branching from the main Glasgow, Paisley and Greenock Railway at Port Glasgow and taking an inland route across to the coast at Inverkip before descending to Wemyss Bay. This was to connect to Clyde steamer services for Rothesay, Largs, and Millport, Isle of Cumbrae, allowing a combined train and steamer journey time of an hour and a half, compared with a typical time of three hours by steamer from Glasgow. The Wemyss Bay Steamboat Company was formed to own the connecting steamers, competing with the private owners of other Clyde steamer services. The route opened on 15 May 1865, but over-ambitious timetables led to severe delays during the first year, damaging the company's reputation, and the route subsequently faced strong competition from other pierheads. A camping coach was positioned here by the Scottish Region in 1961, then two coaches from 1962 to 1969, with an additional one in 1965 only.

Train services were electrified in 1967 by British Rail, using the 25 kV AC system.

=== Station building ===
The station was designed by James Miller in 1903 for the Caledonian Railway and is remarkable in its use of glass and steel curves. The station is noted for its architectural qualities and, although one of Scotland's finest railway buildings and Category A listed, it has suffered from neglect. A major refurbishment scheme carried out jointly by Network Rail, Inverclyde Council and the Scottish Government from June 2014 to the spring of 2016 has seen the station buildings and adjacent ferry terminal fully restored.

Two platforms are currently in use, though there were three available until 1987.

== Facilities ==
The Friends of Wemyss Bay Station group manage a bookshop, gallery and cafe in the station. There is also a ticket office and ticket machine, car park, toilets and cycle storage.

== Services ==
As of November 2024, there is a half-hourly service during the day to Glasgow Central via Paisley Gilmour Street. This service drops to hourly during the evenings, and all-day on Sundays. The average journey time is 55 minutes.

Preceding station	National Rail	Following station
Terminus	ScotRail; Inverclyde Line	Inverkip
	Ferry services	
Rothesay	Caledonian MacBrayne; Bute Ferry	Terminus
	Historical railways	
Terminus	Caledonian Railway; Greenock and Wemyss Bay Railway	Inverkip; Line and station open

== See also ==
- List of Category A listed buildings in Inverclyde
- List of listed buildings in Inverkip, Inverclyde

== Bibliography ==
- Brailsford, Martyn, ed. (December 2017) [1987]. Railway Track Diagrams 1: Scotland & Isle of Man (6th ed.). Frome: Trackmaps. ISBN 978-0-9549866-9-8.
- Butt, R. V. J. (October 1995). The Directory of Railway Stations: details every public and private passenger station, halt, platform and stopping place, past and present (1st ed.). Sparkford: Patrick Stephens Ltd. ISBN 978-1-85260-508-7. OCLC 60251199. OL 11956311M.
- Clark, A.J.C. (2001). Caley to the Coast : Rothesay by Wemyss Bay (1st ed.). Usk: The Oakwood Press. ISBN 0-8536-1580-2. OCLC 48979972.
- Marshall, Geoff; Pipe, Vicki (2018). The Railway Adventures: Places, Trains, People and Stations. September Publishing. ISBN 978-1910463871.
- McCrorie, Ian (1986). Clyde Pleasure Steamers (1st ed.). Greenock: Orr, Pollock & Co. Ltd. ISBN 1-869850-00-9. OCLC 20596284.
- McRae, Andrew (1998). British Railways Camping Coach Holidays: A Tour of Britain in the 1950s and 1960s. Vol. Scenes from the Past: 30 (Part Two). Foxline. ISBN 1-870119-53-3.
