= West Burn, Greenock =

River in Scotland

From the Greenock Cut, the burn flows down the Hole Glen to Barr's Cottage then to Westburn, where Greenock's first harbour formed, at Ocean Terminal.

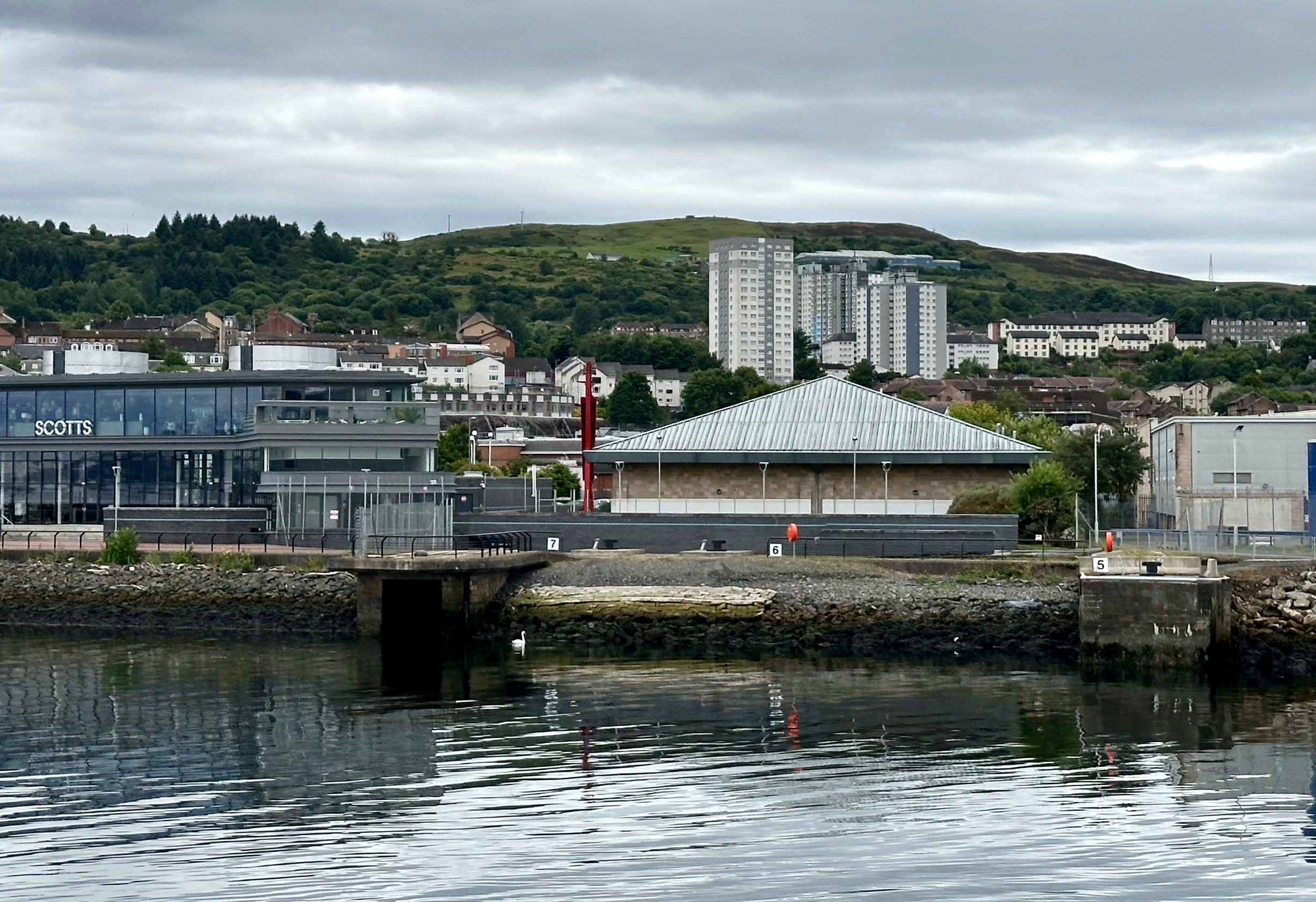
Swan at the West Burn culvert; former Westburn shipyard now Ocean Terminal and Waterfront Cinema, on the distant hill features Overton waterworks terminate The Cut.

The West Burn, Greenock, is is among the most historicallY significant of the many streams and rivers that flow down through Greenock to the estuary of the River Clyde and the deeper Firth of Clyde. Its source in adjacent moorland hills as the Hole Burn runs down a steep ravine called the Hole Glen to the Kip Valley, where it becomes the West Burn, once the boundary with the barony of Finnart.

Fishing boats sheltered in the river mouth. In 1591, after chapels in the area were closed, the Old West Kirk was built on its west bank. A small village became a town, with a weekly market and a jetty for fishermen from 1635. Herring busses took international exports and, following Cartsdyke and Port Glasgow, quays enclosed Greenock harbour in 1710. Shipbuilding in the town started in 1711, with Scotts' building busses in their Westburn yard. Water mills powered the town's industry, its first sugarhouse openied in 1765 near Scott's. Reservoirs were built, culminating in the Loch Thom aqueduct scheme including sluices controlling the proportion of flow down the Hole Burn. Caird & Company expanded the Westburn shipyard which was sold to Harland & Wolff in 1916, but closed in 1935. After wartime use as RAF Greenock it was disused until Waterfront redevelopment.

== Location ==
The coast is closely hemmed by an uneven ridge of hills fronting high moorland. The burn follows a pass known as the Kip Valley which has its high point near Branchton. Beyond there, the Spango Valley runs southwest down to Inverkip. The west side of the pass is bounded by Earn Hill and Bow Hill, to its southeast the main group of hills extends from Dunrod Hill near Inverkip to Corlic Hill south of Port Glasgow.

Numerous streams flow down from the hills. The Hole Burn, which originates on the flank of Scroggy Bank to the north of Dunrod, runs down the steep sided Hole Glen past the former Hole Farm, joining the West Burn at Barr's Cottage. With Bow Hill to its north, the river flows past a former monastic cell at Kilblain, and at its mouth formed a small harbour. The coast here is sheltered by the Tail of the Bank shoal.

=== Scroggy Bank, Hole Burn ===
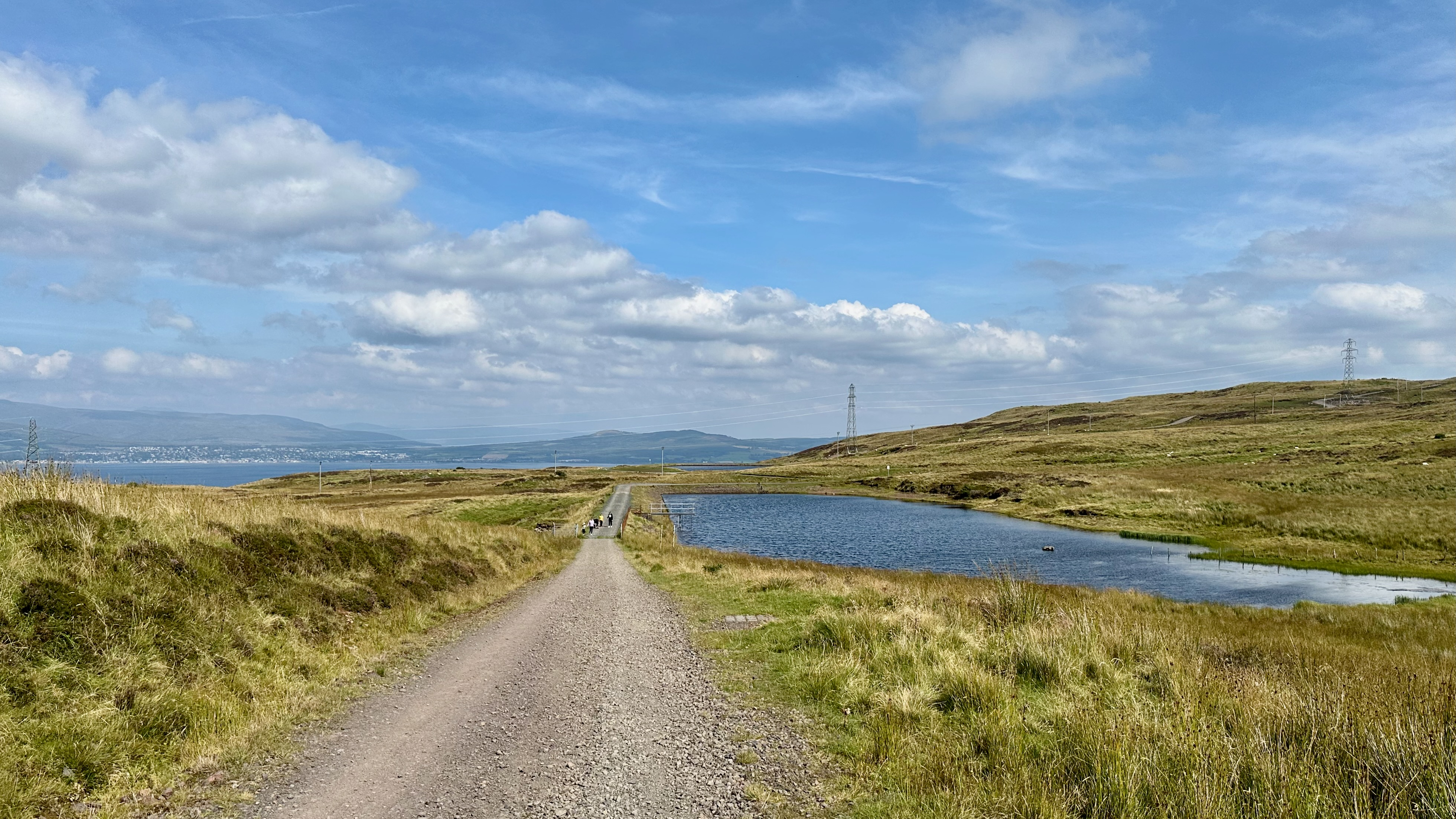
Down from Scroggy Bank, Reservoir No. 6 has sluices to Hole Burn channels, and Reservoir No. 8 is near Overton

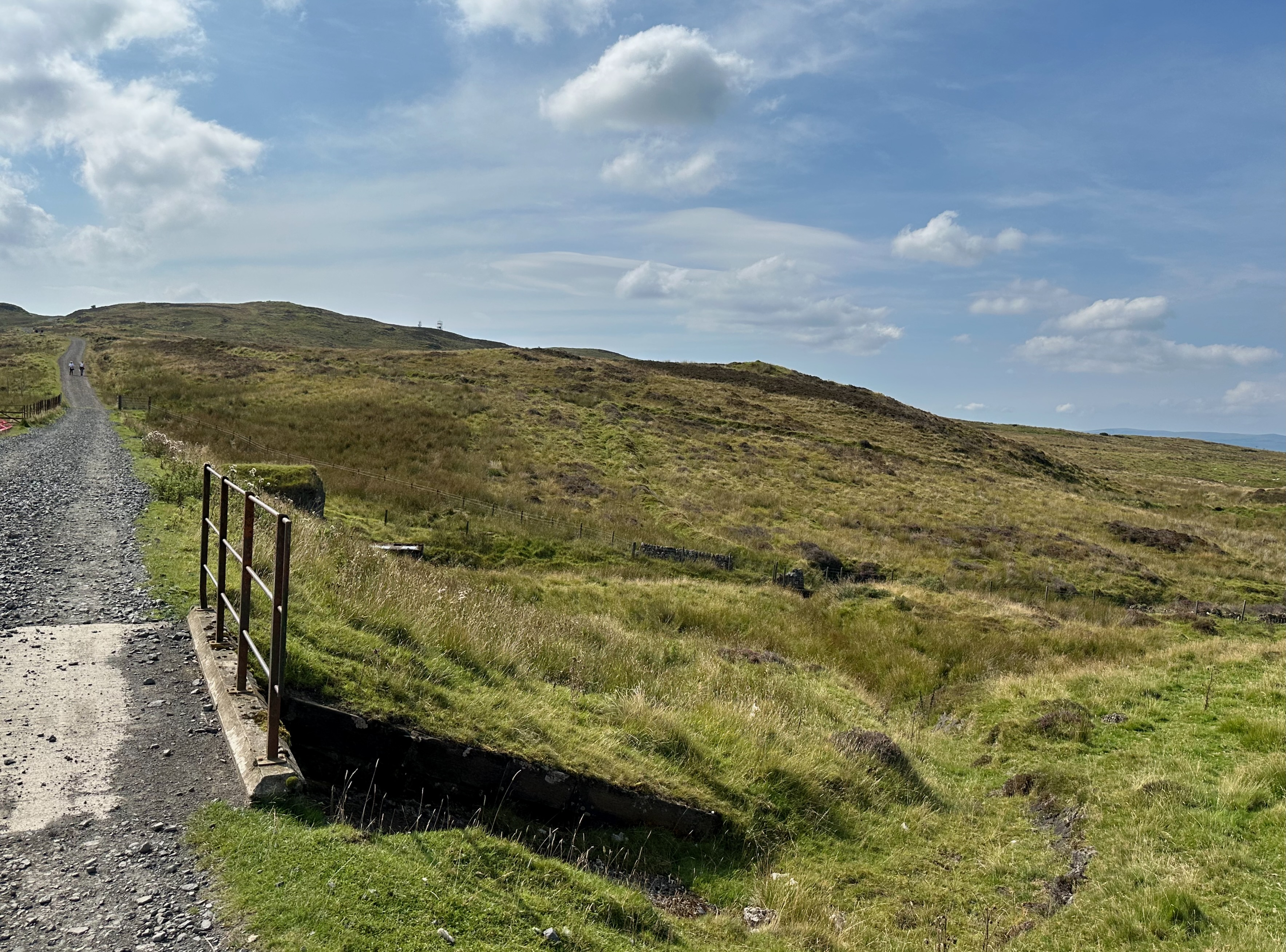
Reservoir No. 6 has sluice house and channel to the Hole Burn

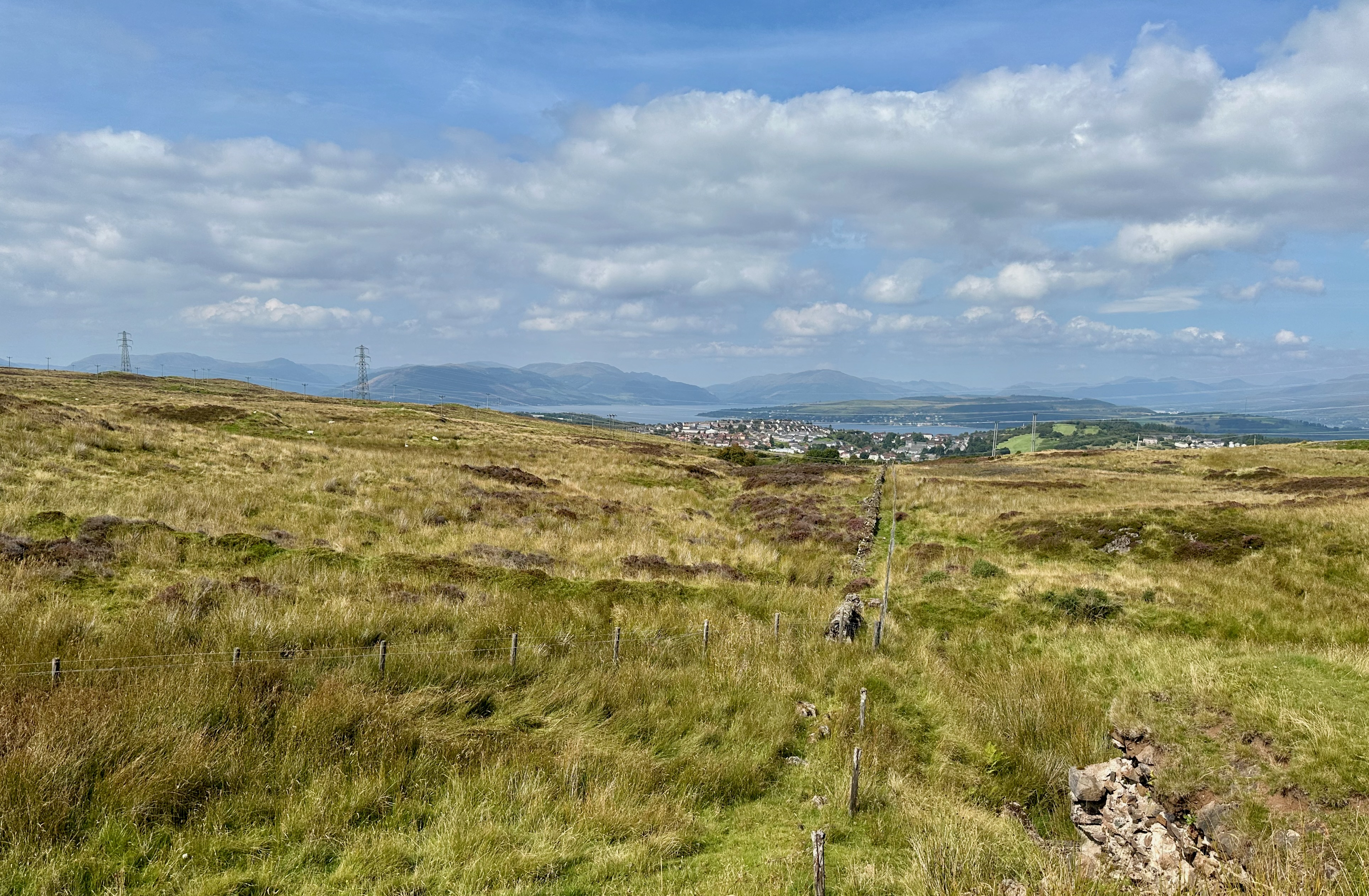
From Reservoir No. 6, Hole Burn channels and view to Bow Hill

=== Greenock cut at Hole Glen ===
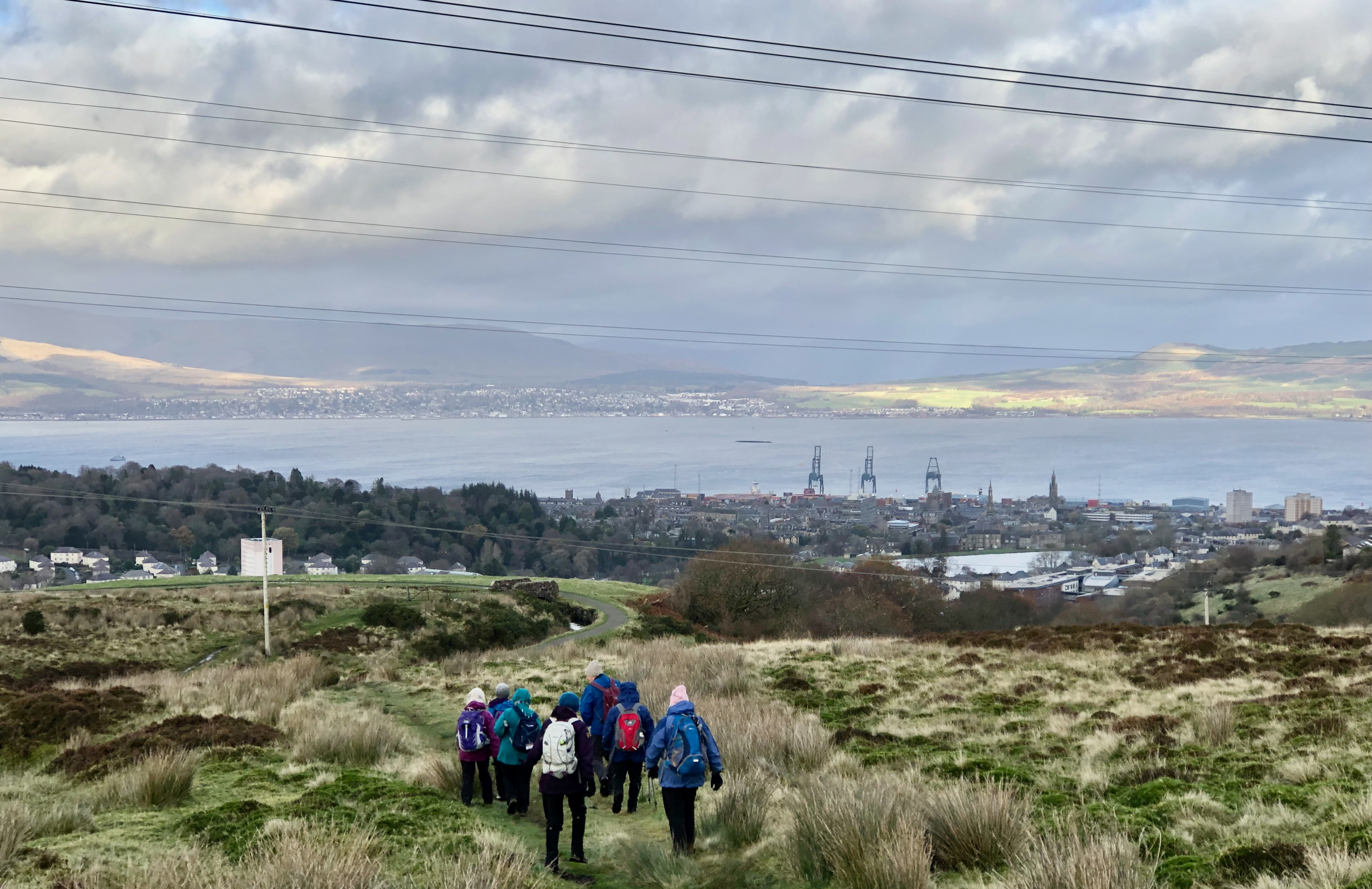
Winter descent to Greenock Cut above Hole Glen

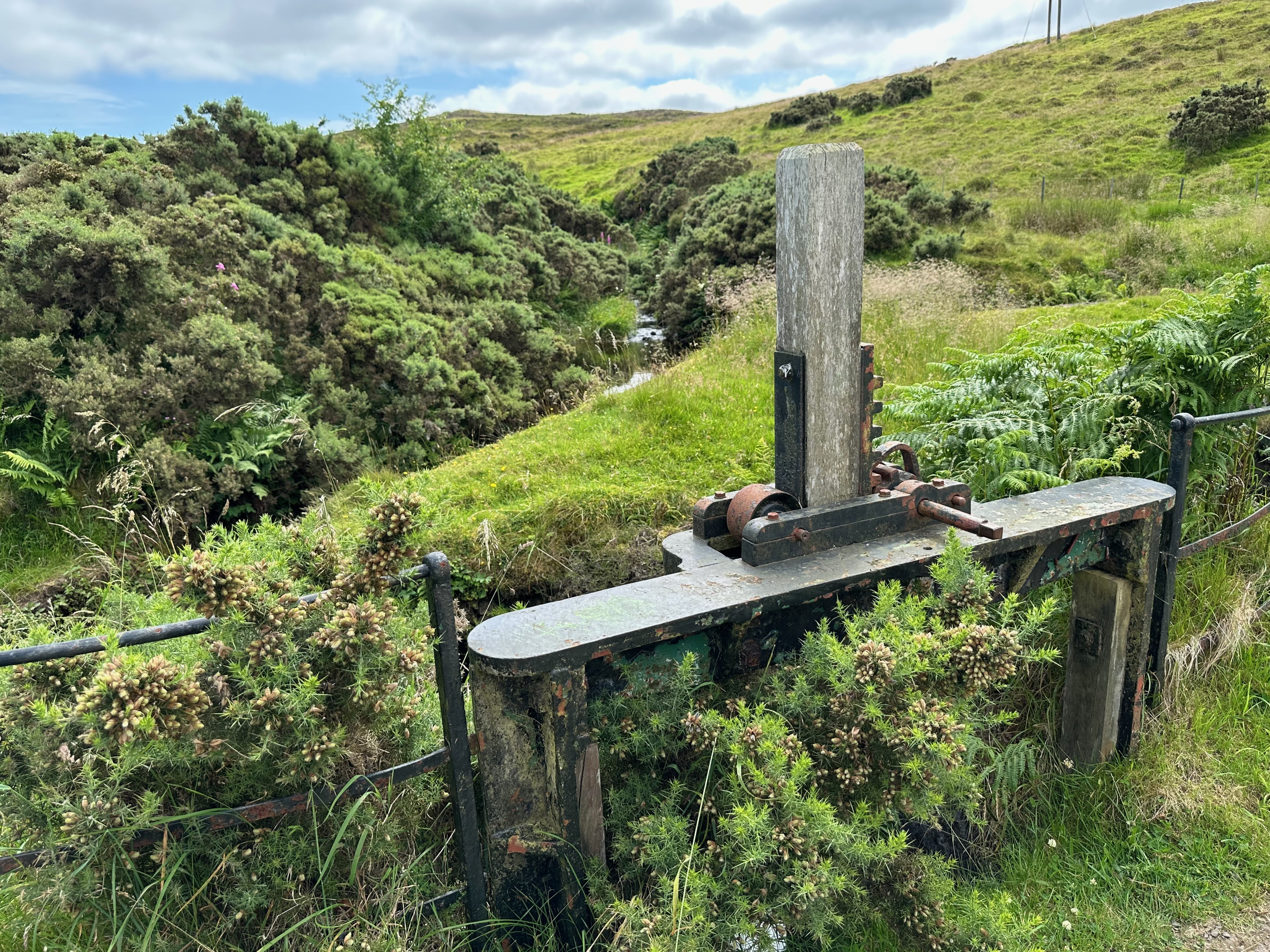
Hole Burn nearing Greenock Cut sluice

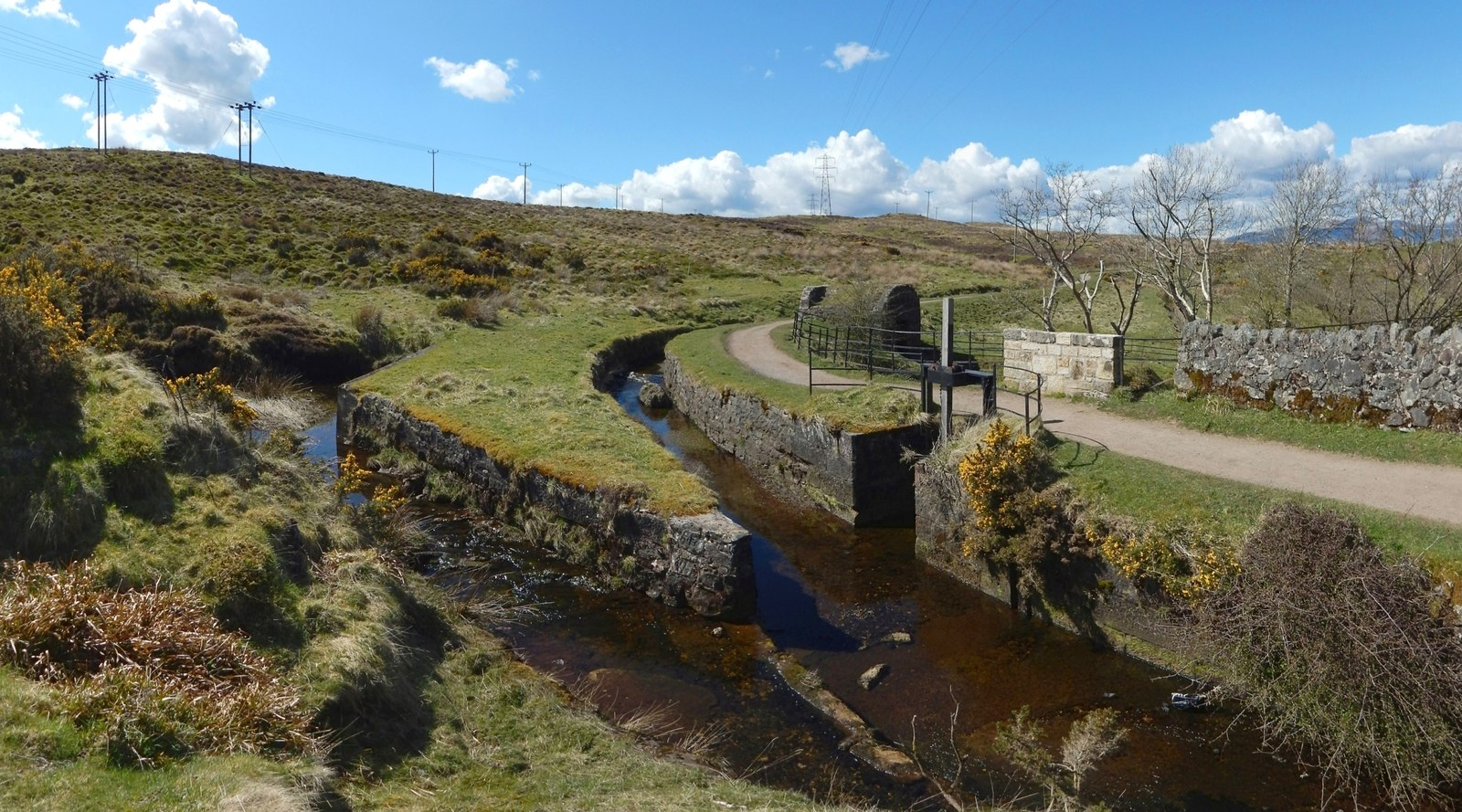
Hole Burn junction to Greenock Cut, sluice house and gate

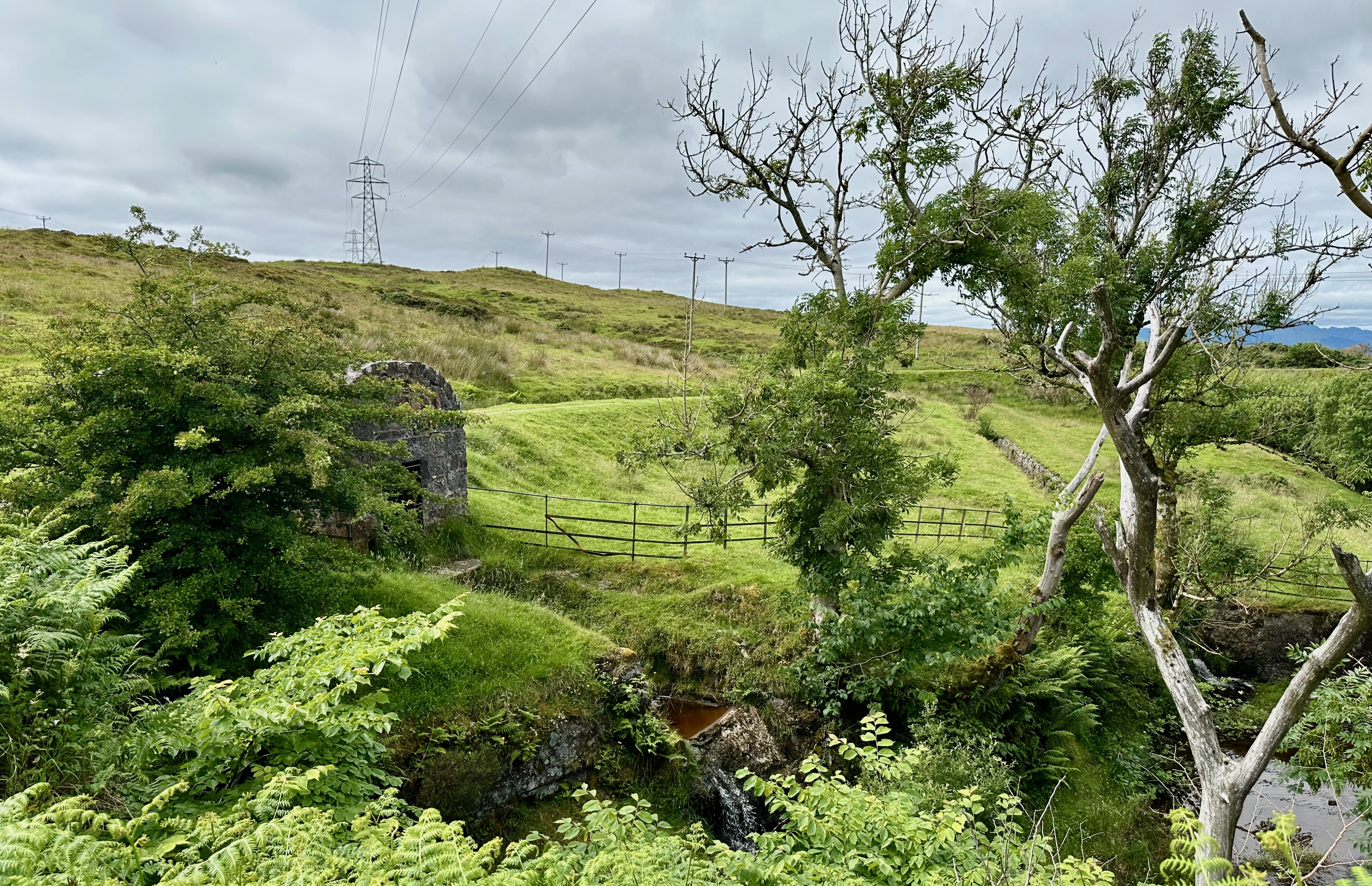
Sluice house above pool

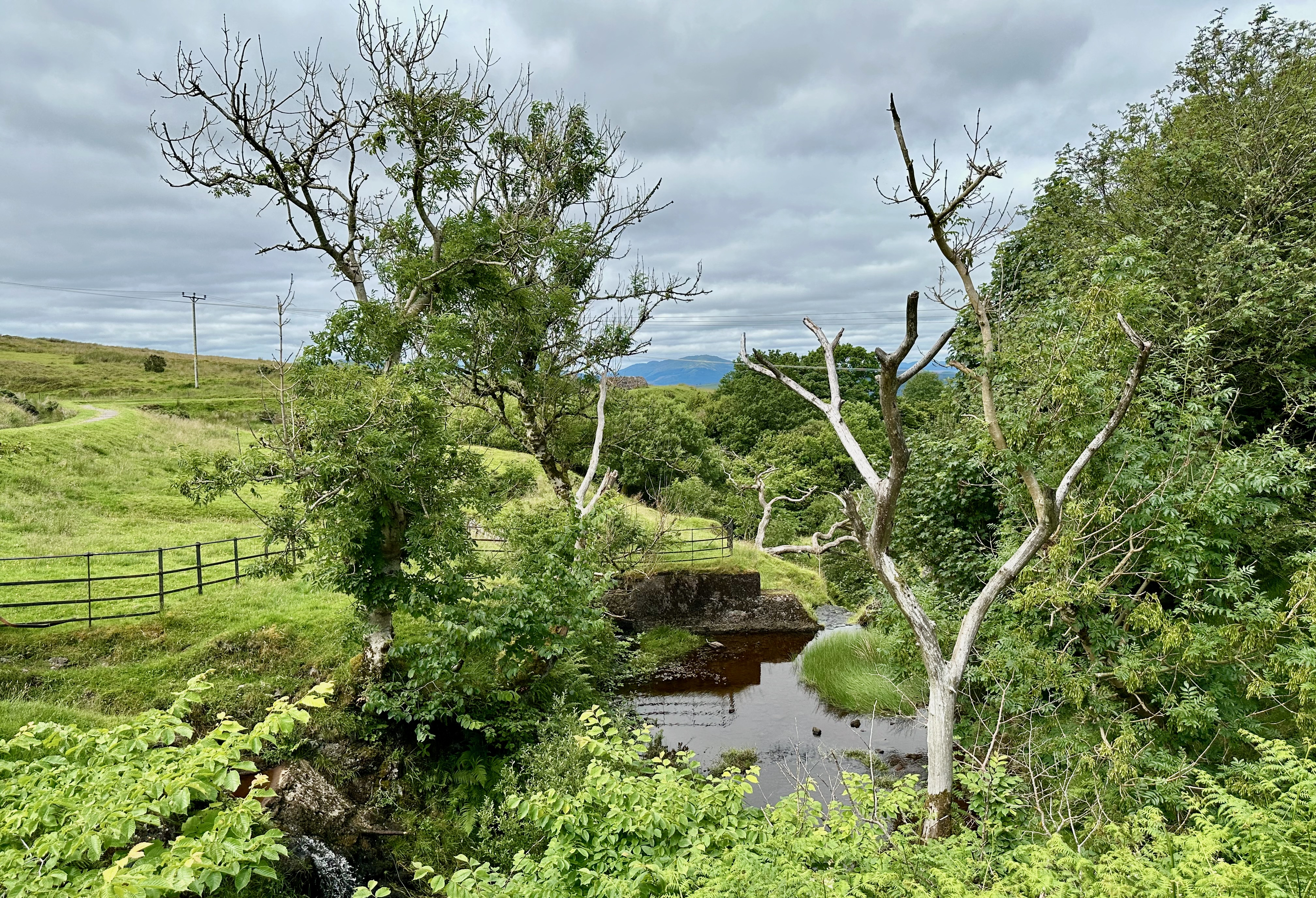
Hole Burn pool at head of Hole Glen

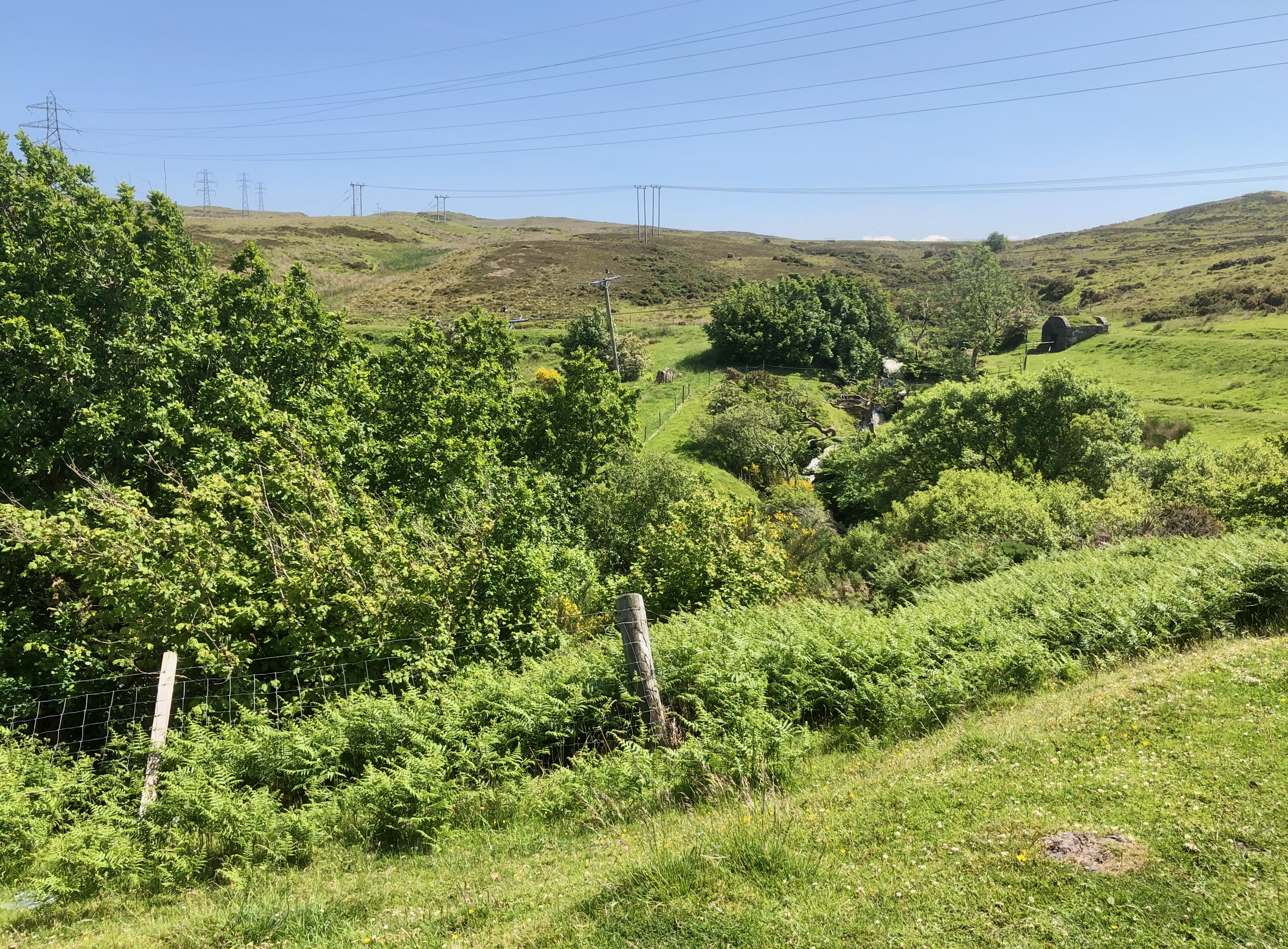
Hole Glen waterfalls down from sluice house

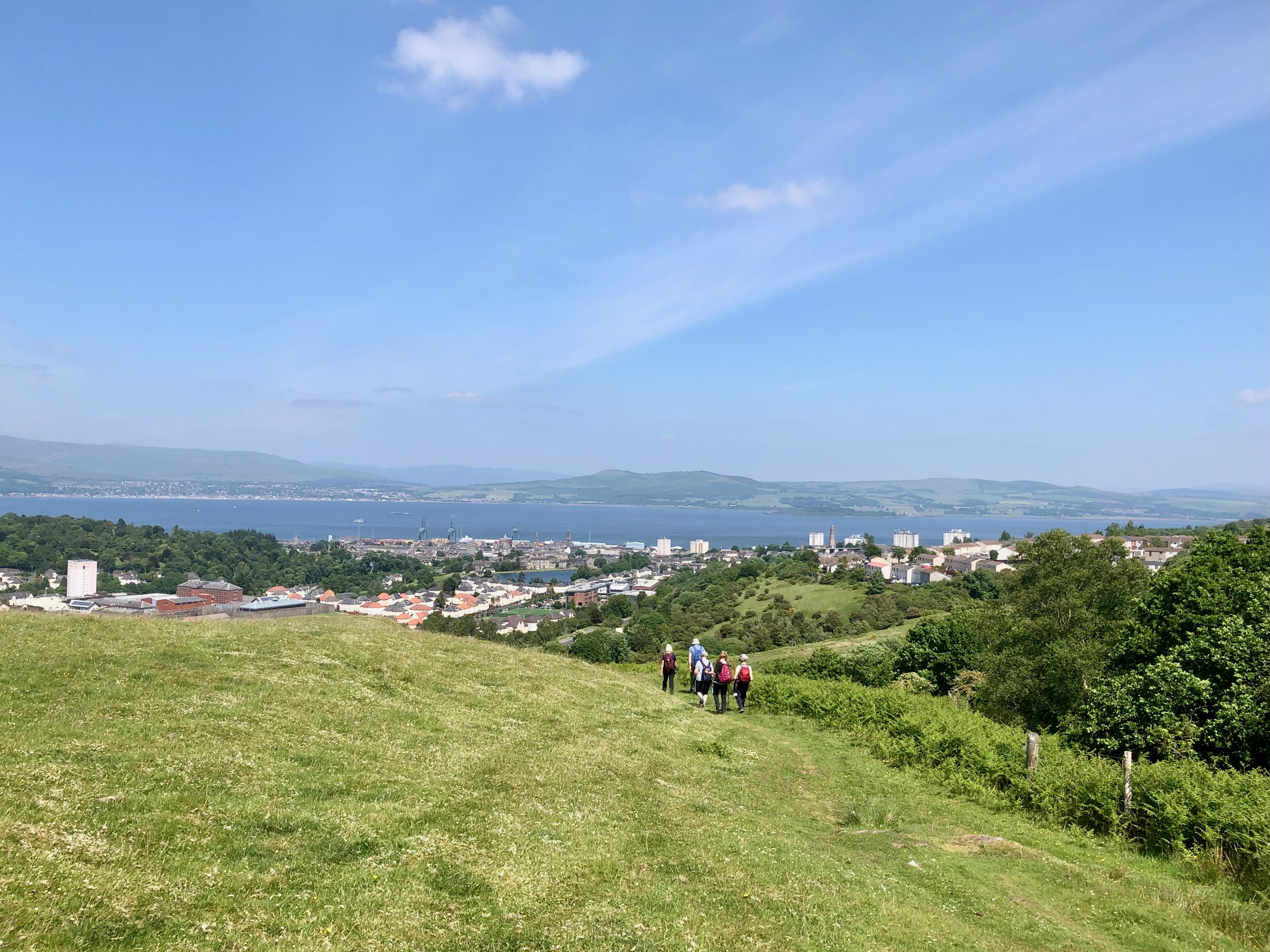
Hill track beside Hole Glen, view over Cowdenknowes

=== Hole farm site at Cowdenknowes, Kip Valley, Rankin Park ===
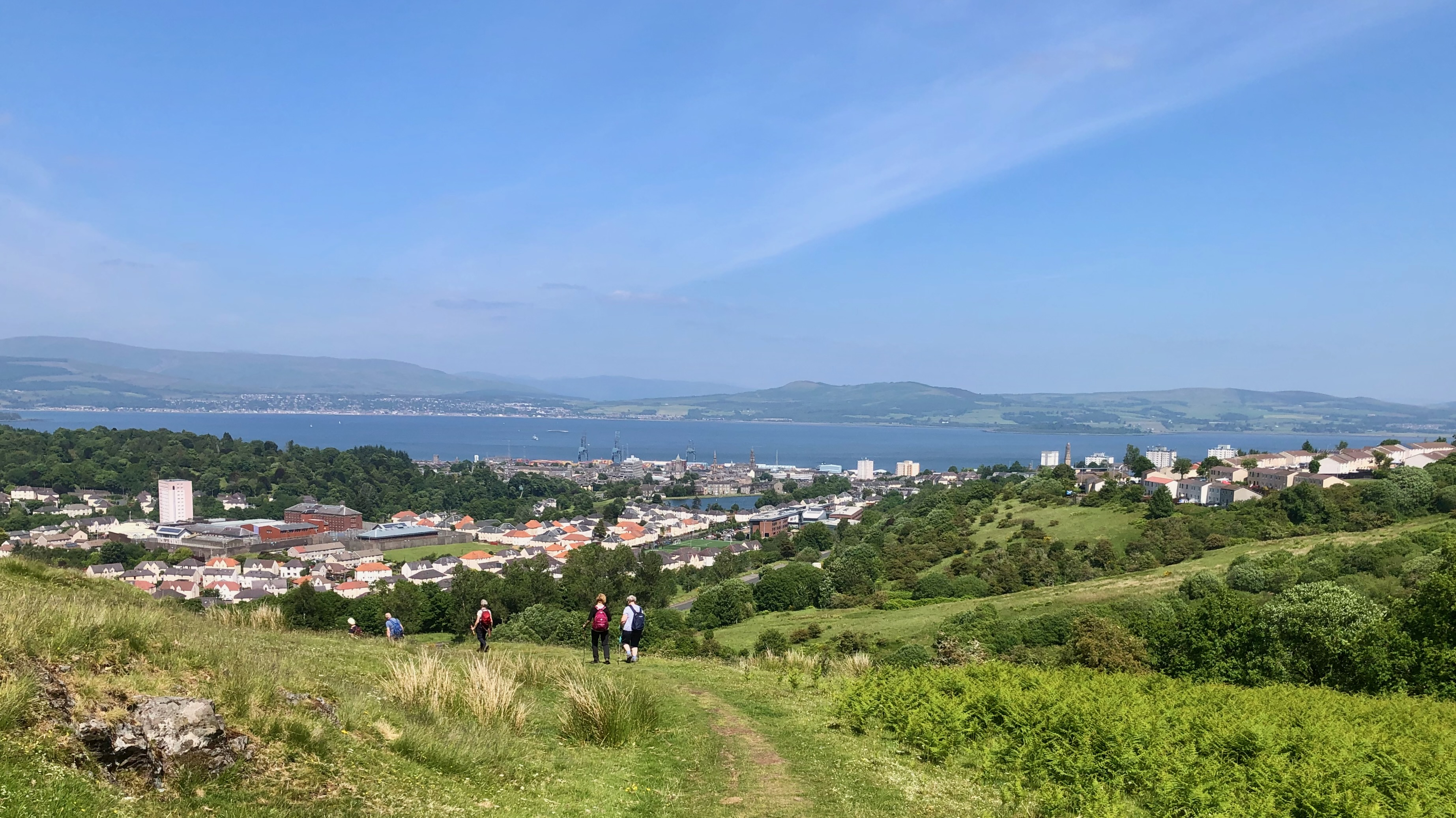
Cowdenknowes neighbourhood, Kip Valley

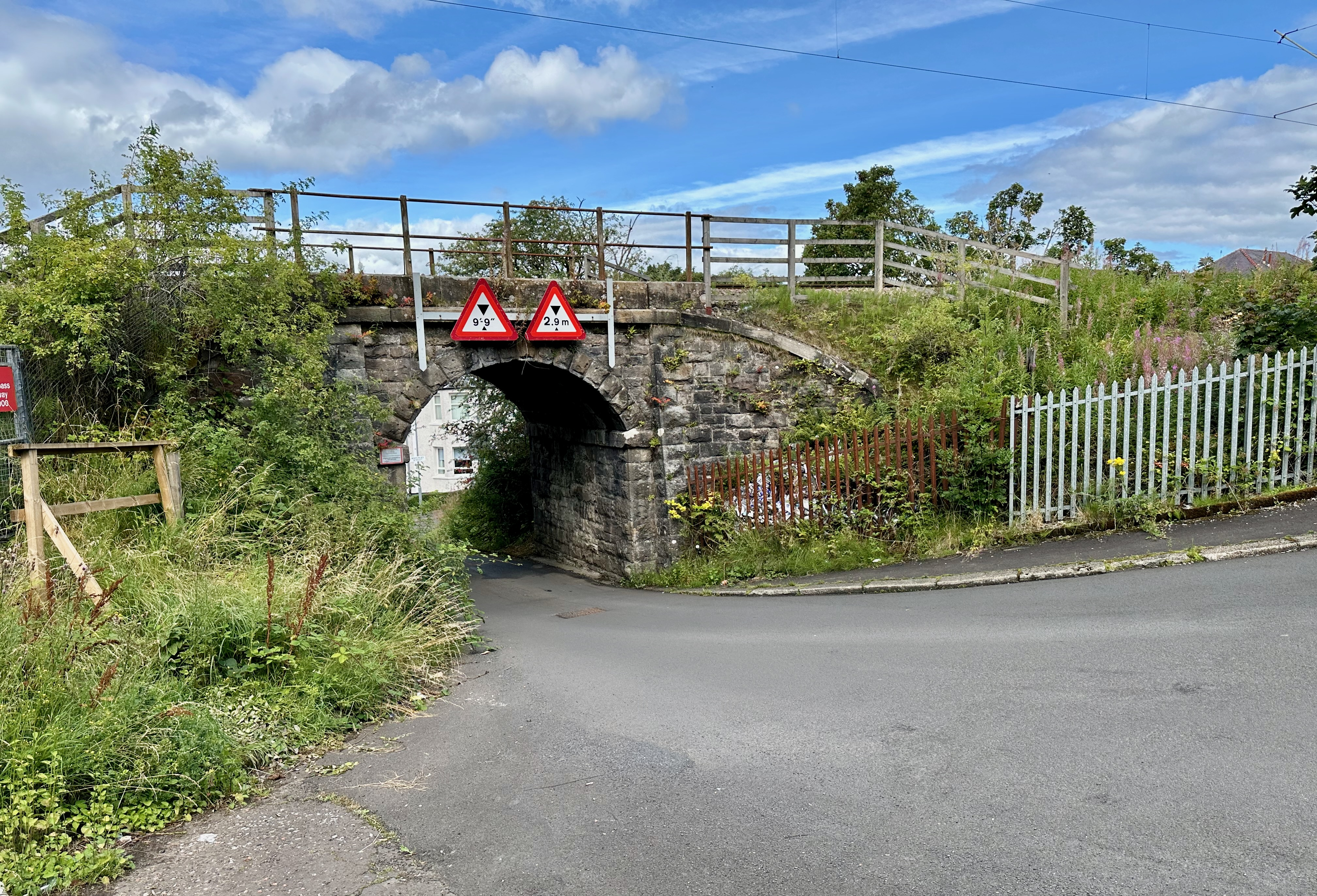
Greenock and Wemyss Bay Railway bridge over Hole Farm Road at Cowdenknowes

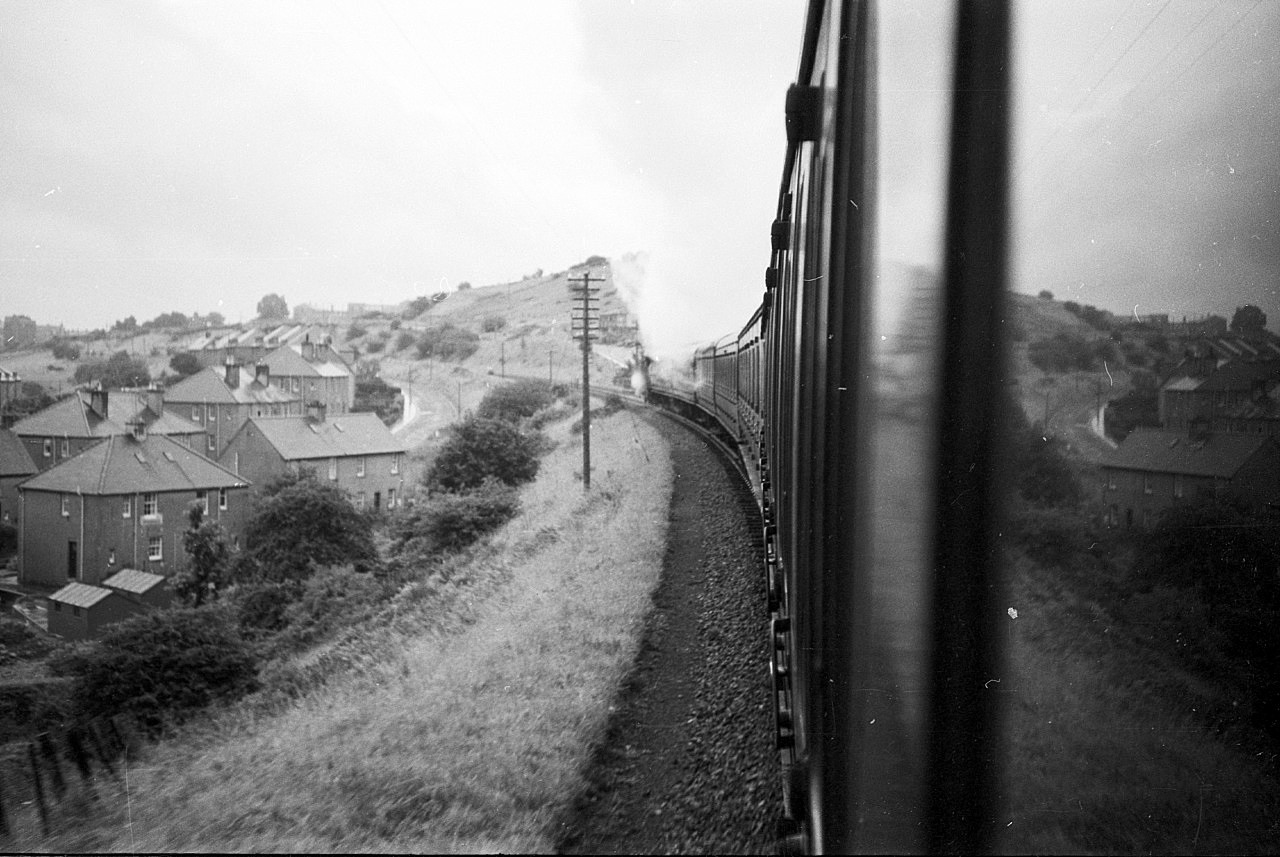
1965 train up from Branchton, passing over Hole Farm Road at Cowdenknowes

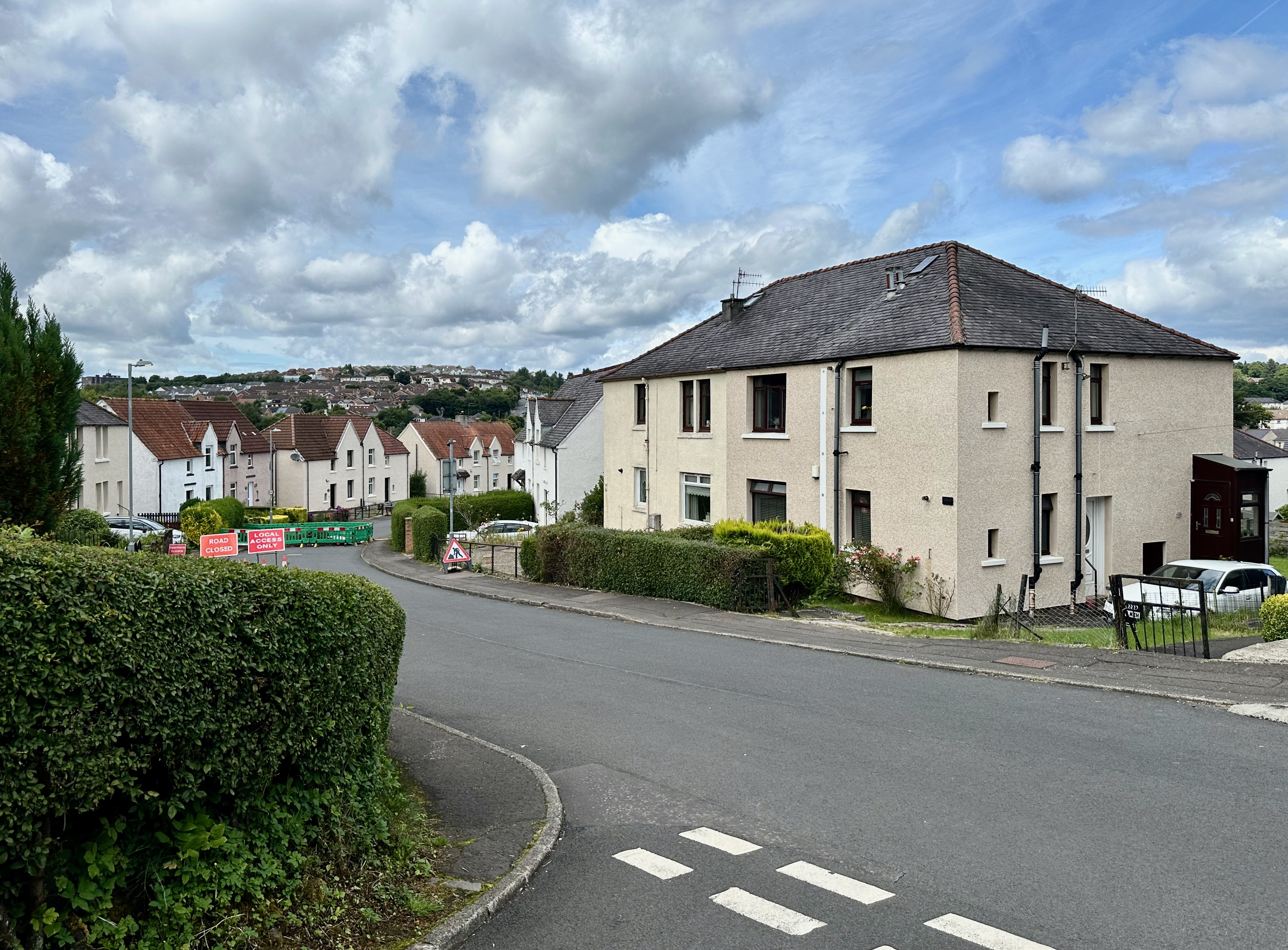
Cowdenknowes, Kip Valley houses built in 1930s on site of Hole farm

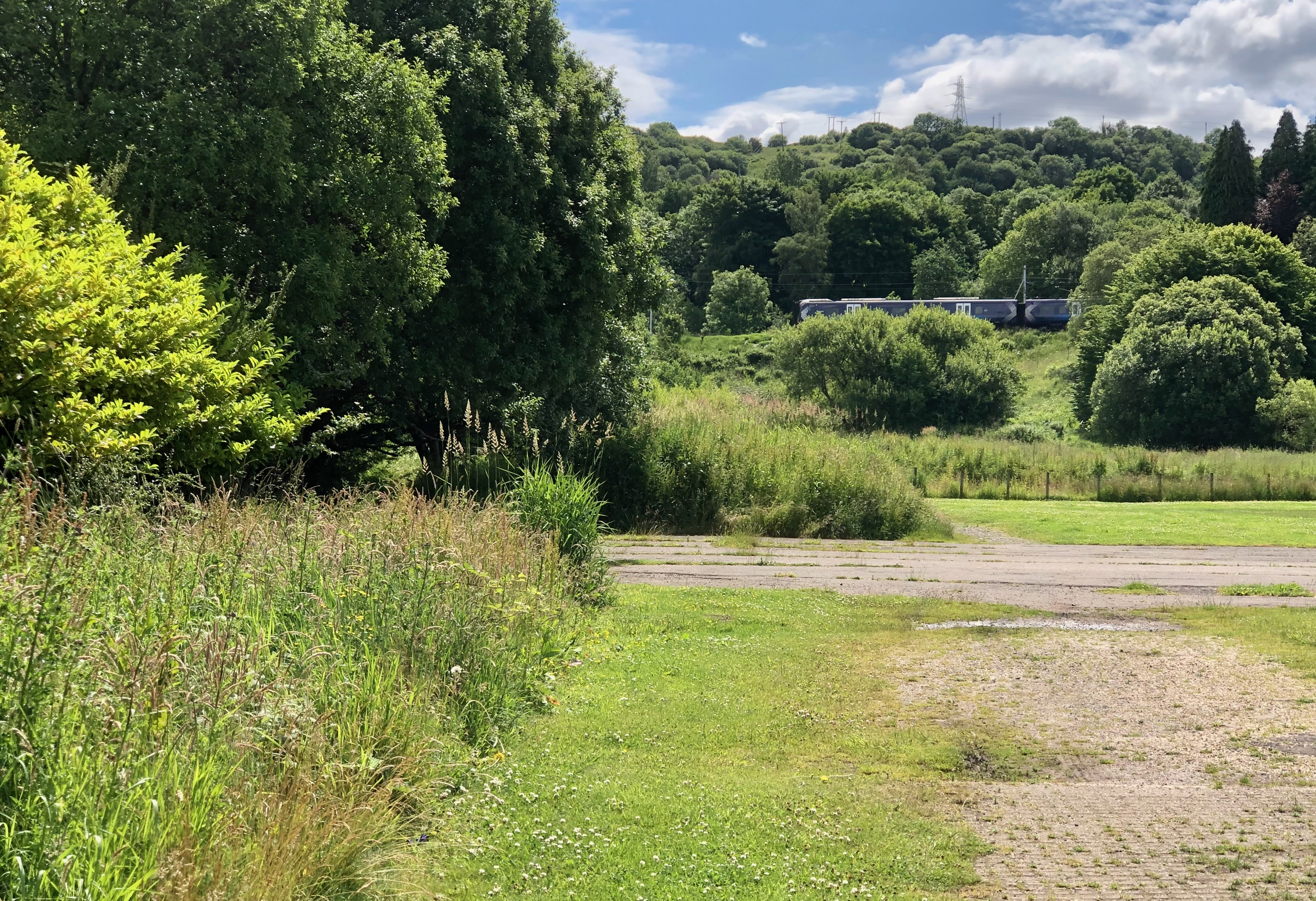
Hole Burn overgrown at Rankin Park, railway passing Hole farm site

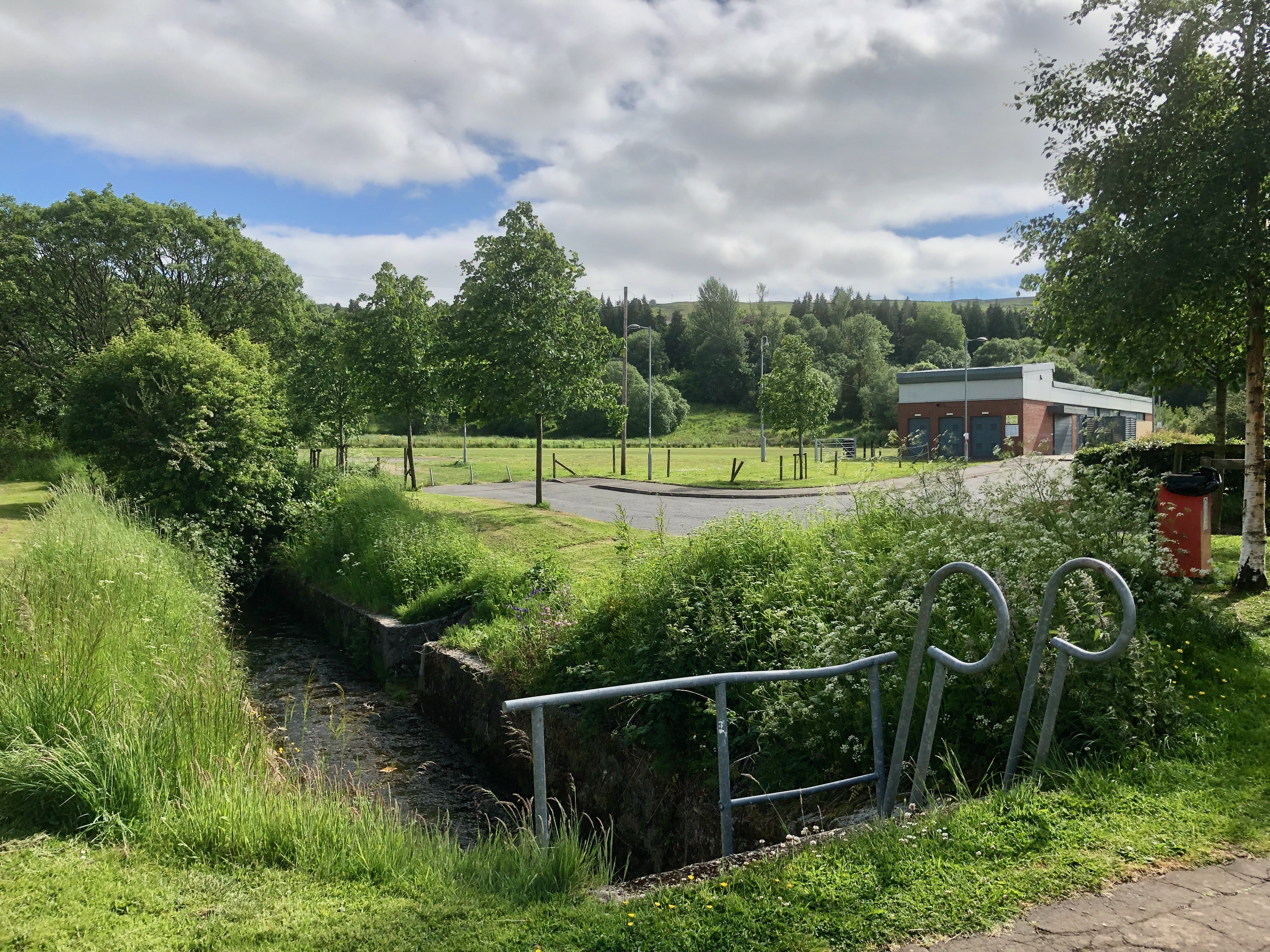
Rankin Park, burn at Dunlop Street culvert

=== Barr's Cottage, Inverkip Road ===
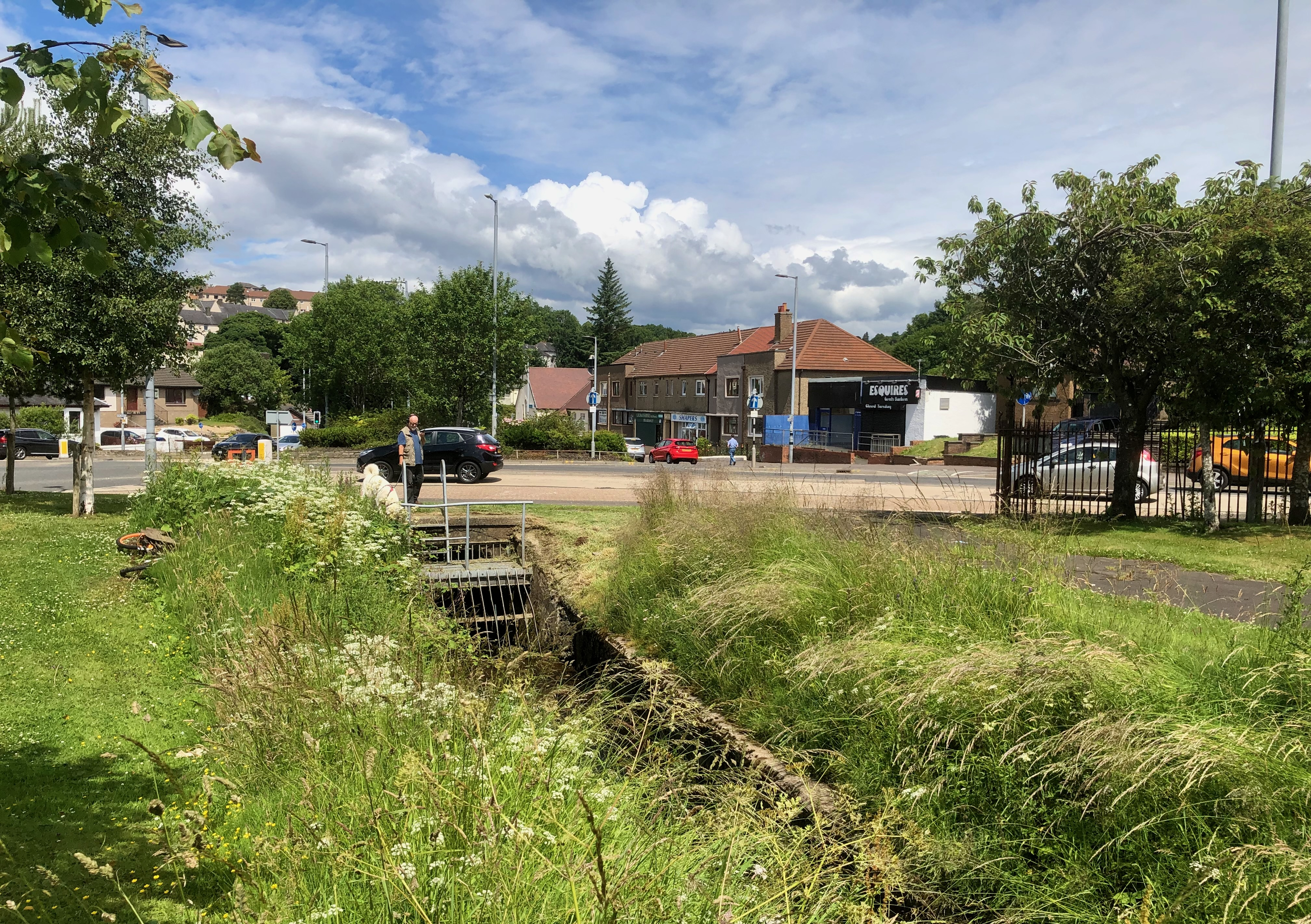
Barr's Cottage, West Burn culvert under Dunlop Street

Barr's Cottage down from Dunlop Street, fence to West Burn

Fence to West Burn, Old Inverkip Road at library

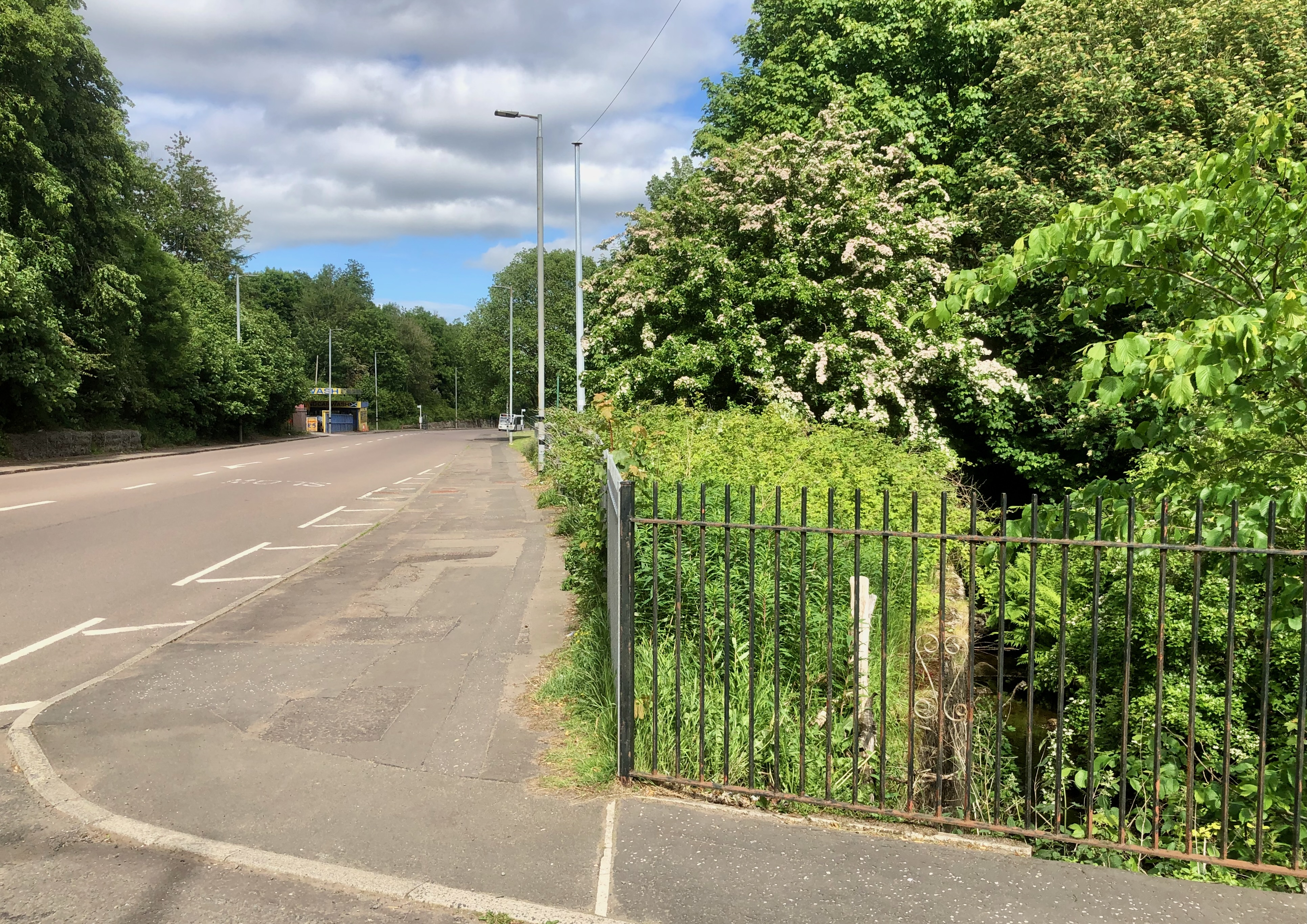
Short sections of the channel can be seen beside Inverkip Road.jpg

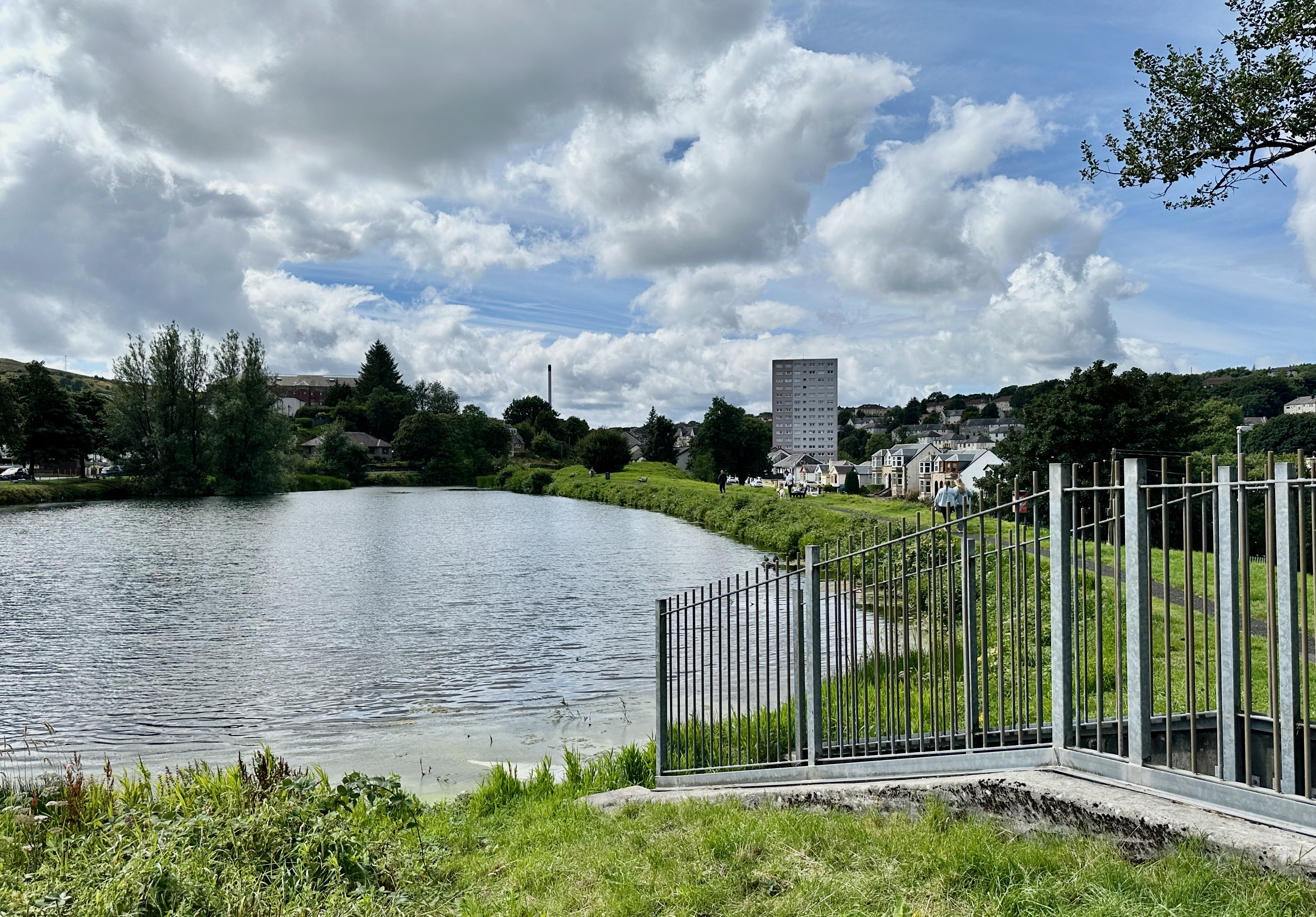
Town Reservoir, filled by the Murdieston Burn

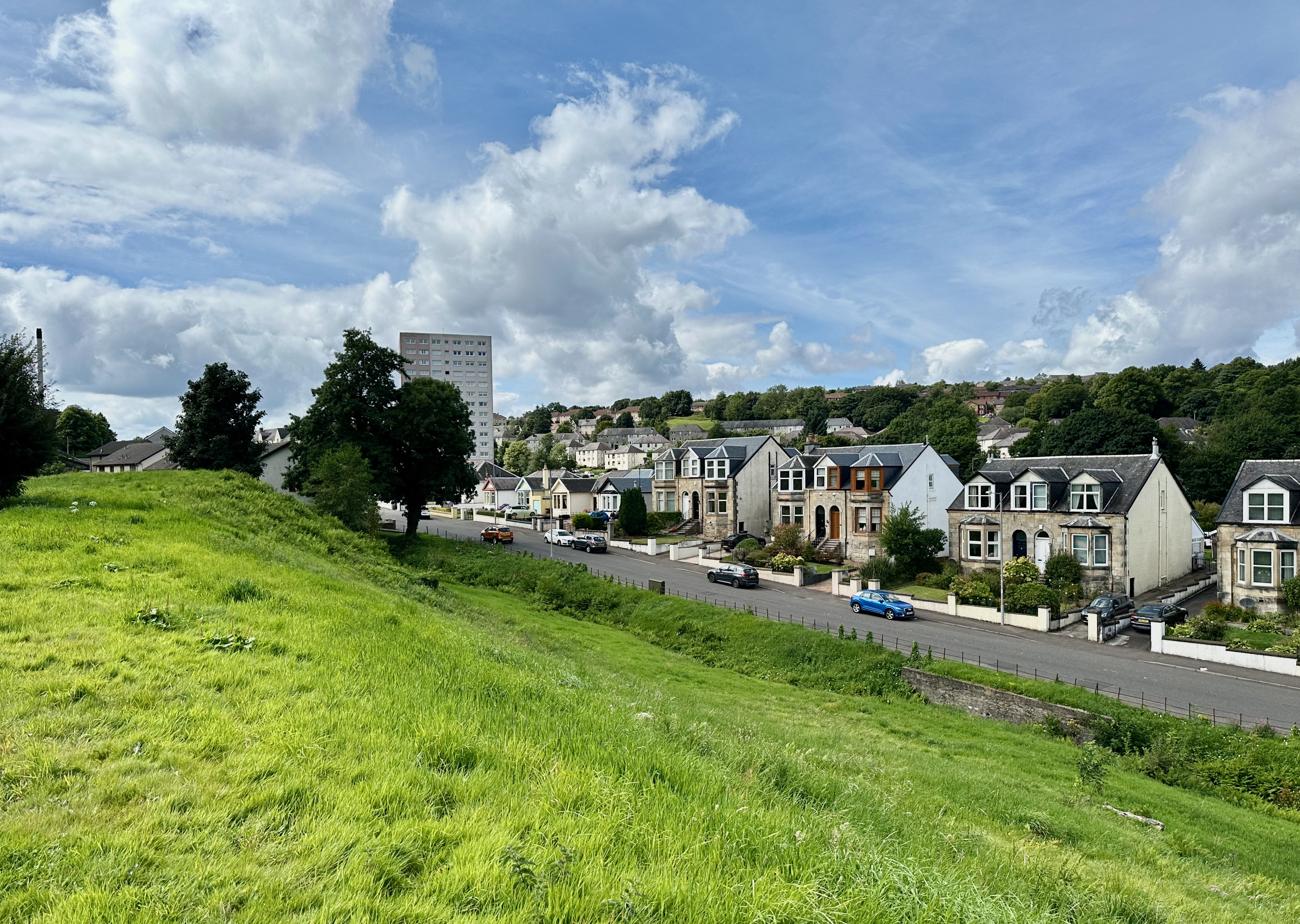
Rankin Court, Murdieston Burn beside Old Inverkip Road

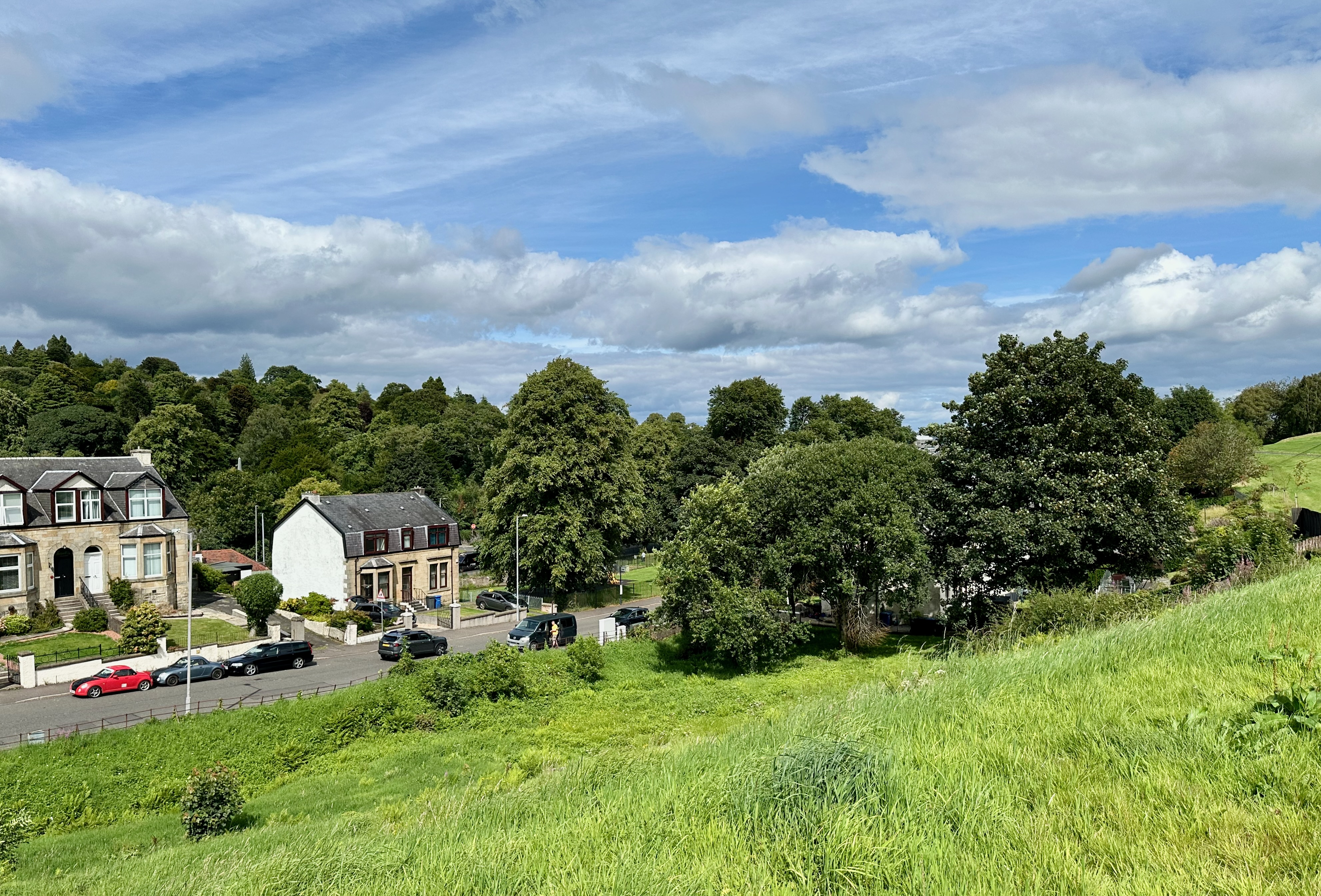
Murdieston Burn culverted to Lady Alice Park pond

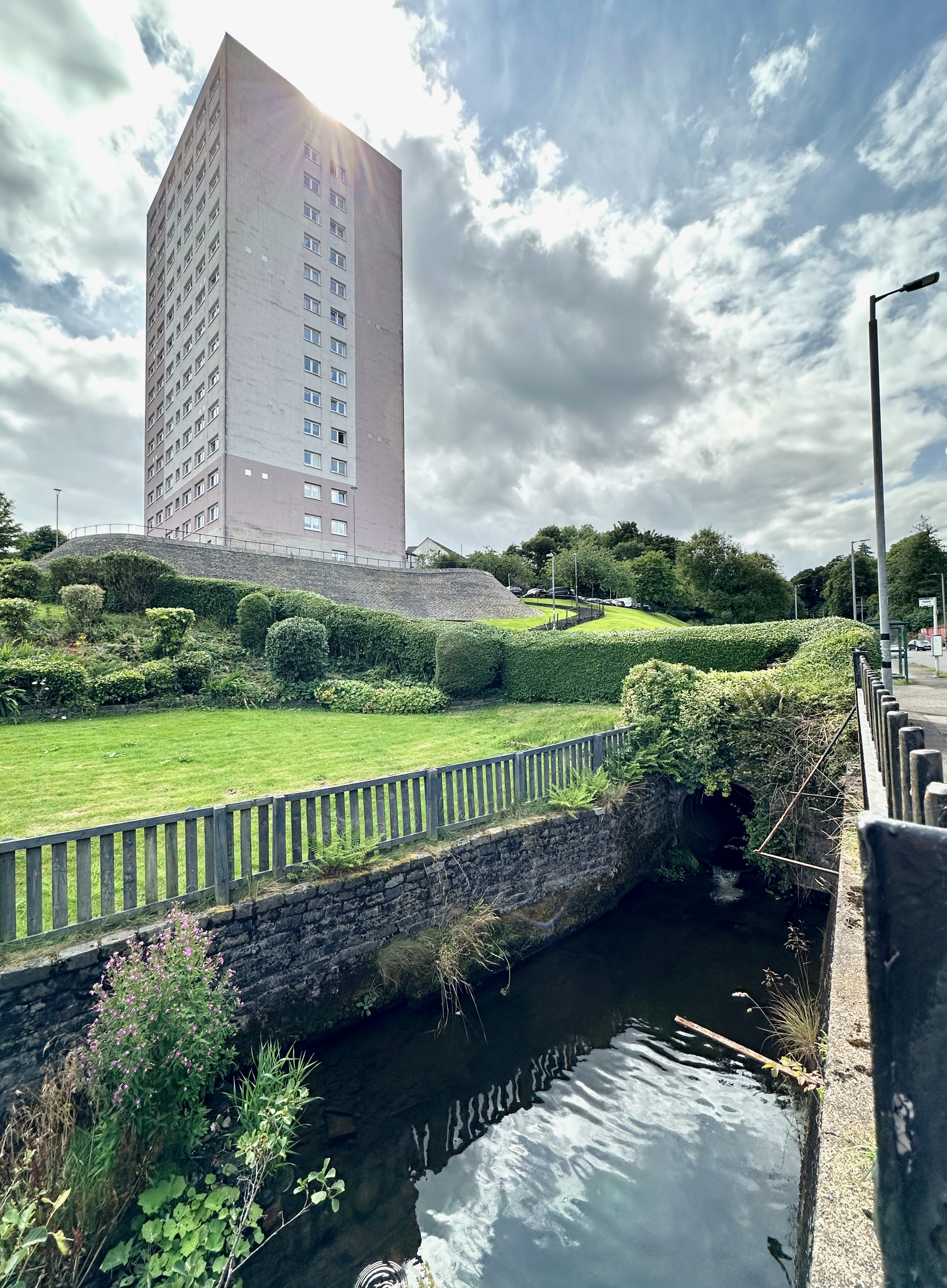
Rankin Court, West Burn culvert feeds open channel

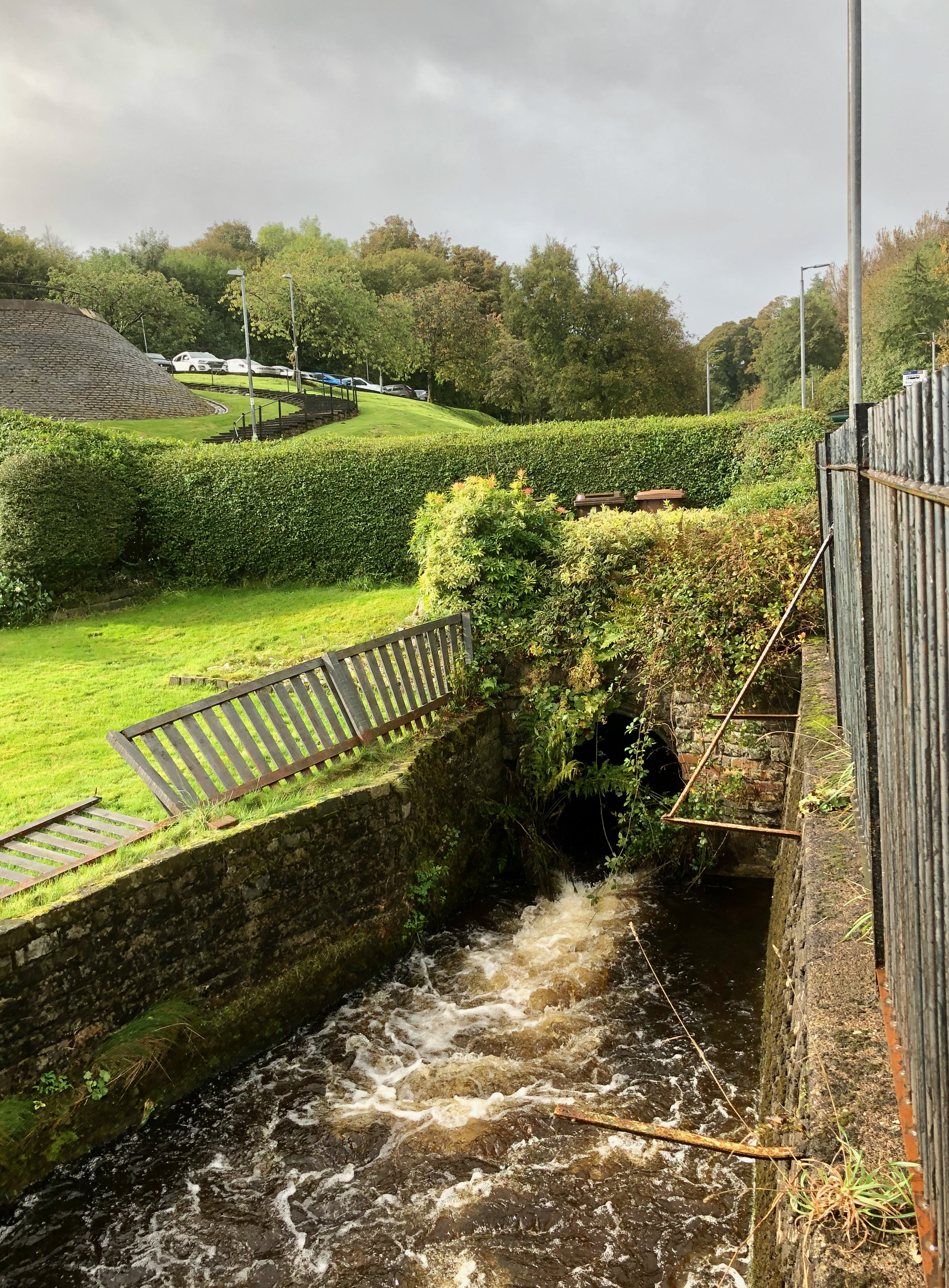
Culvert feeds channel at 49 Inverkip Road

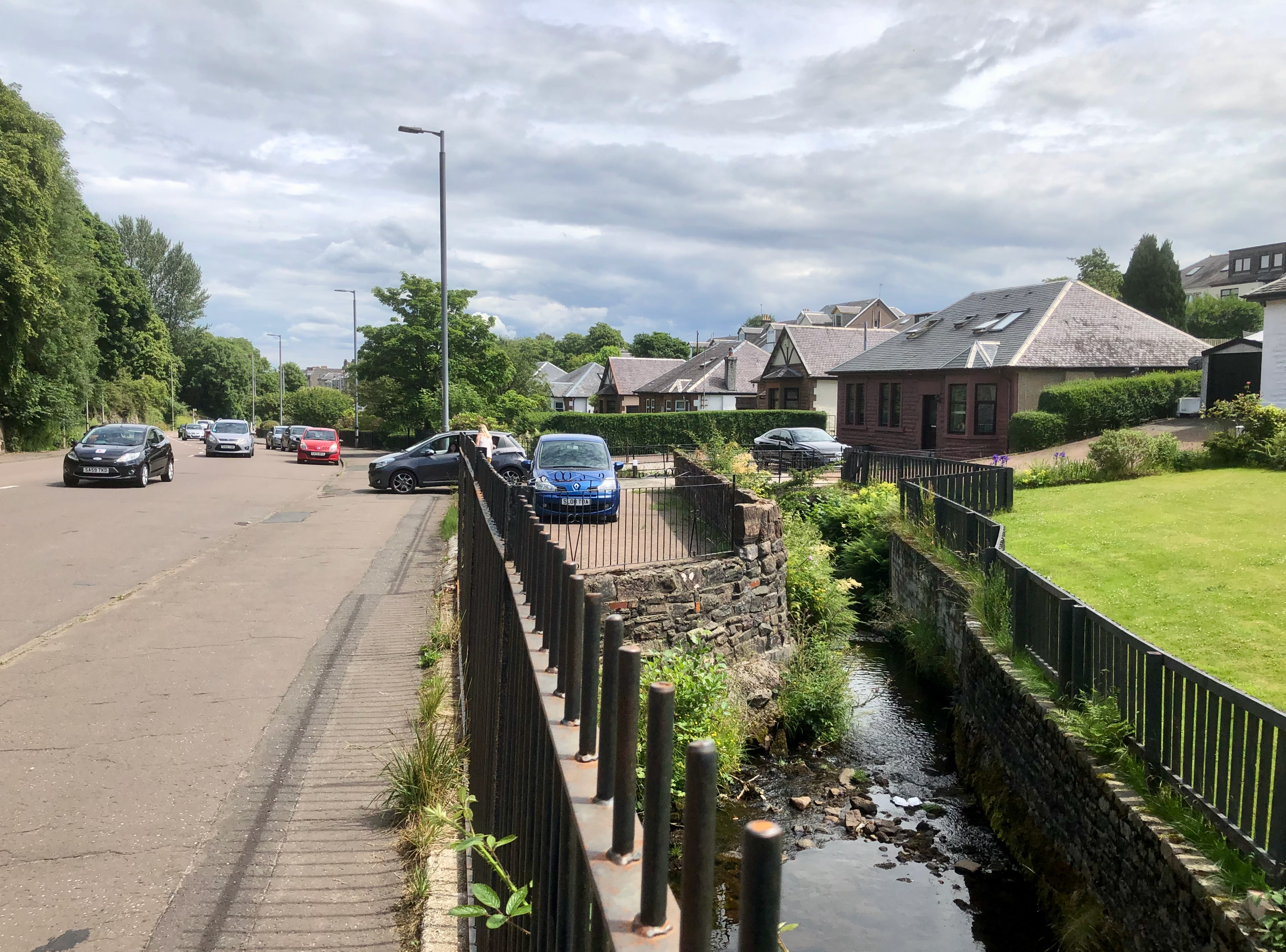
Inverkip Road, West Burn channel

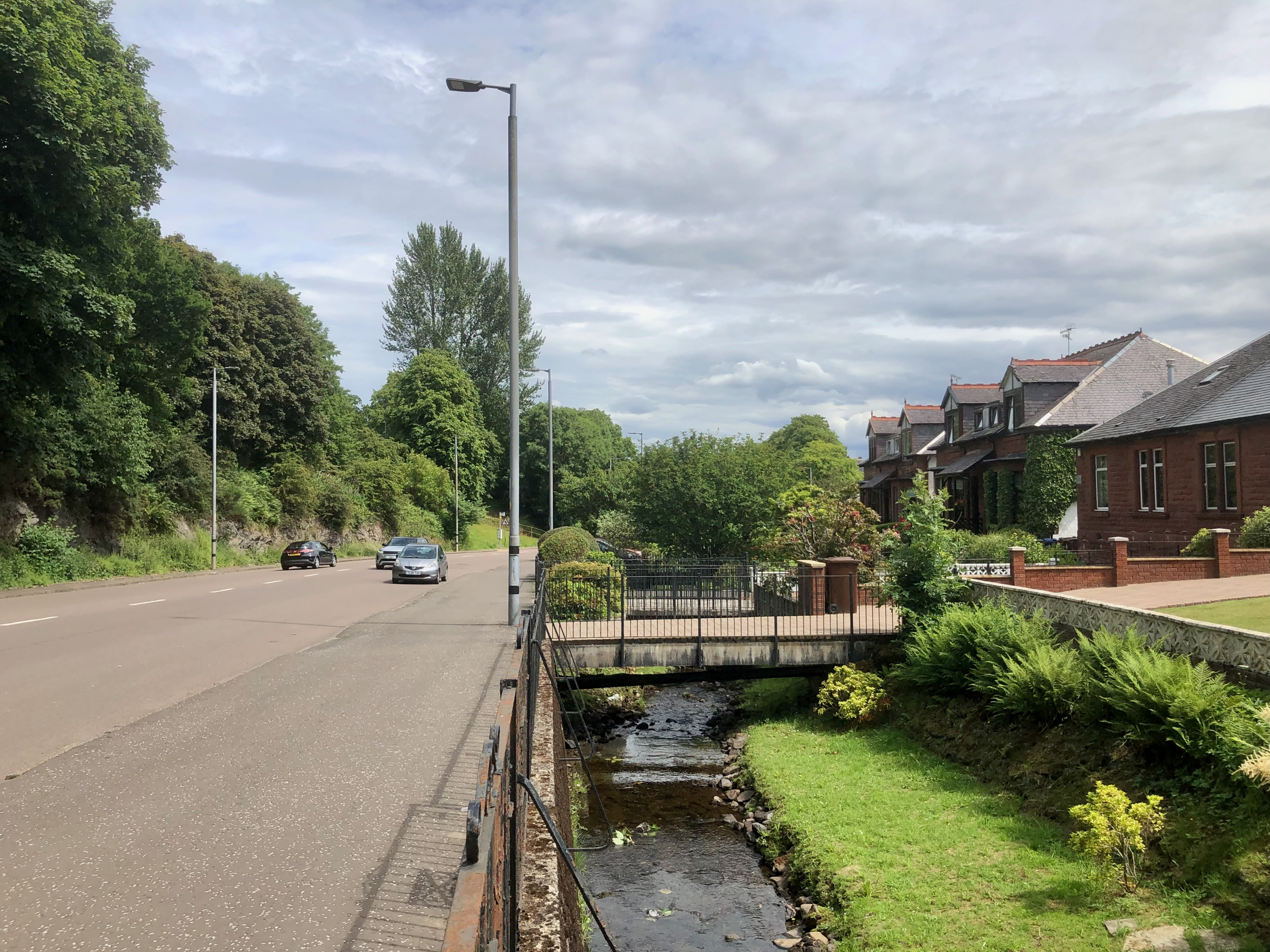
Bridges over West Burn

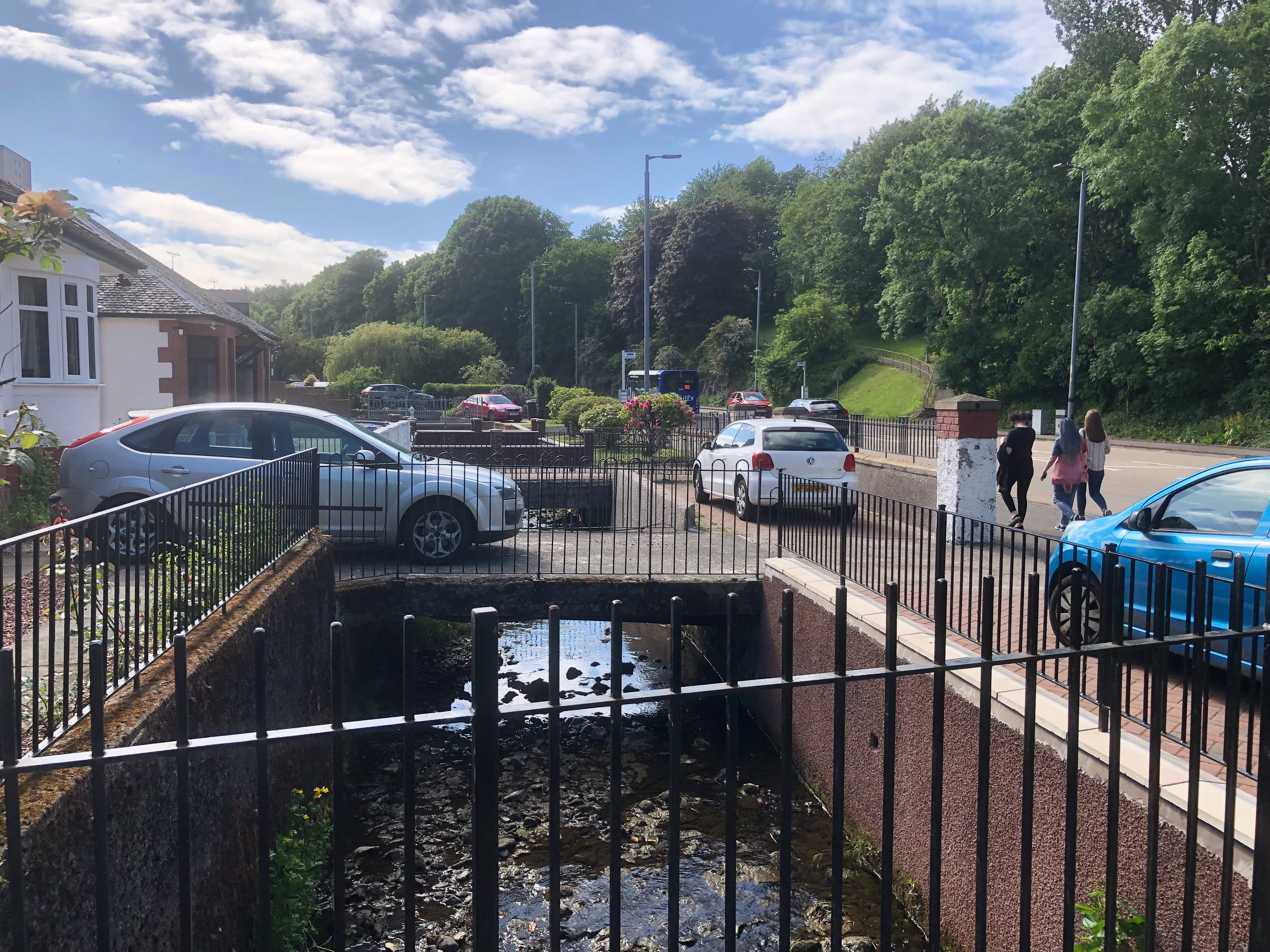
View upstream from Lady Alice park

=== Lady Alice Park, Brachelston Street, Inverkip Road ===
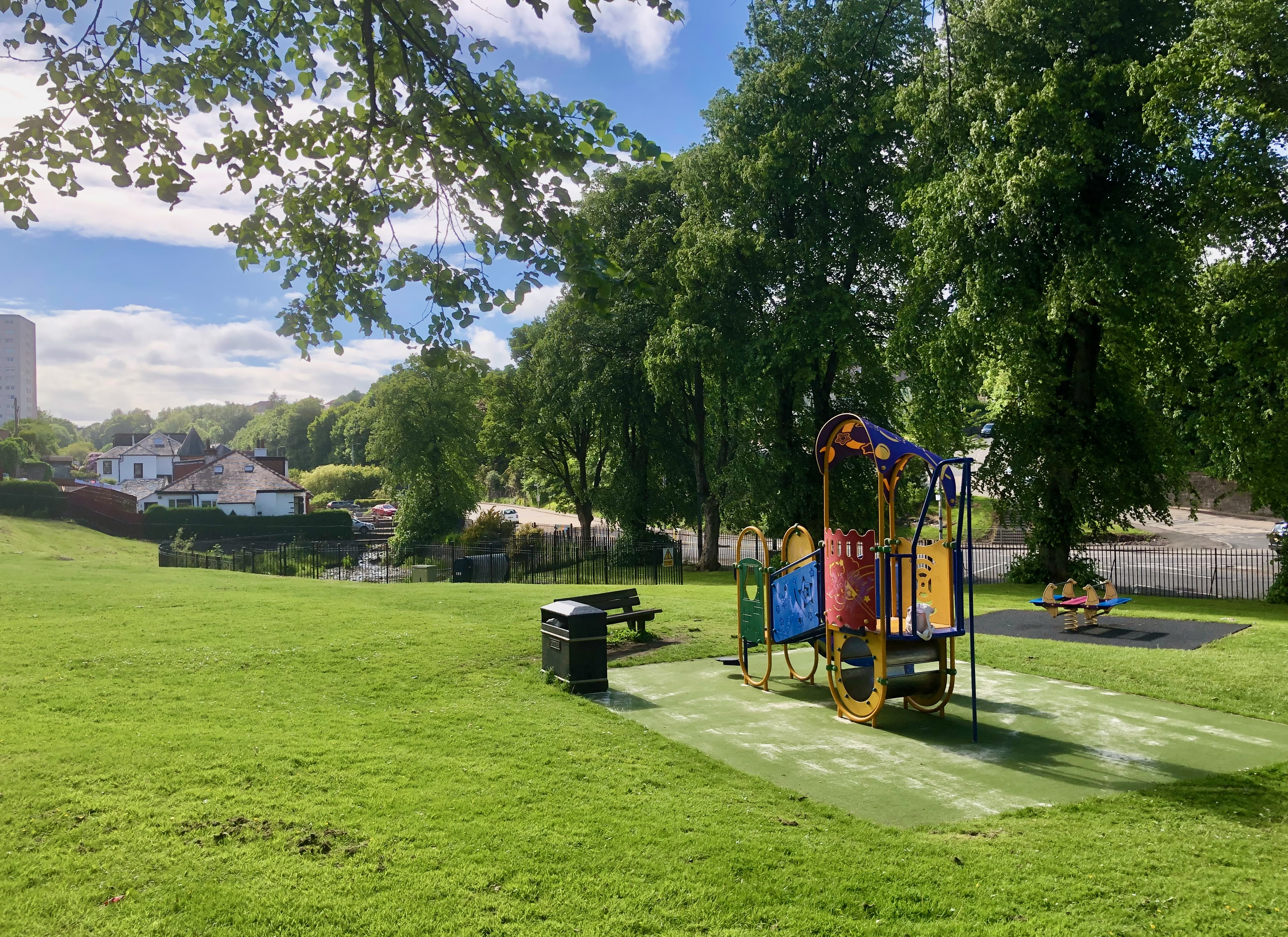
Lady Alice Park, houses with bridges to Inverkip Road

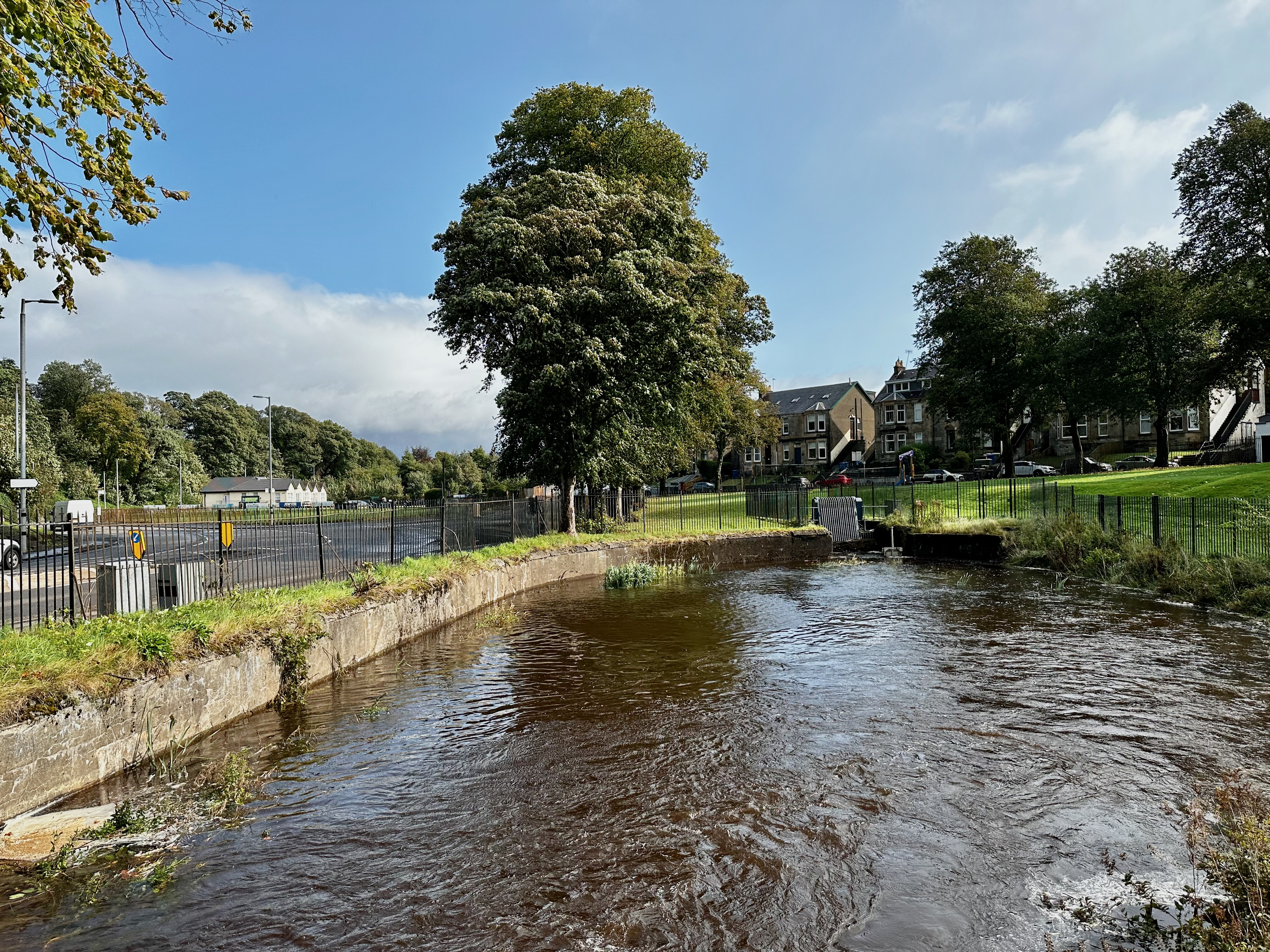
Lady Alice Park pond in spate

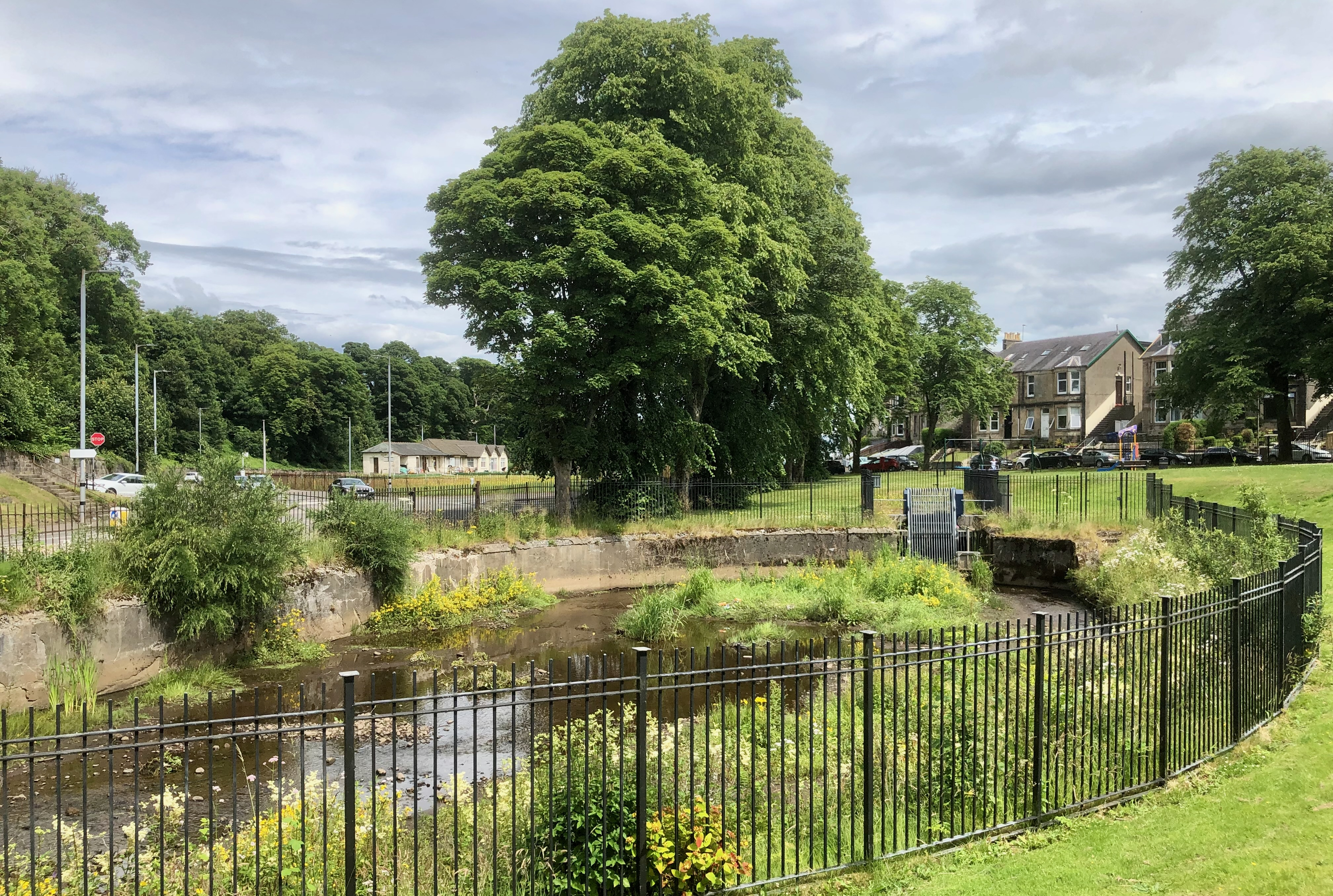
Old Inverkip Road meets Brachelston Street

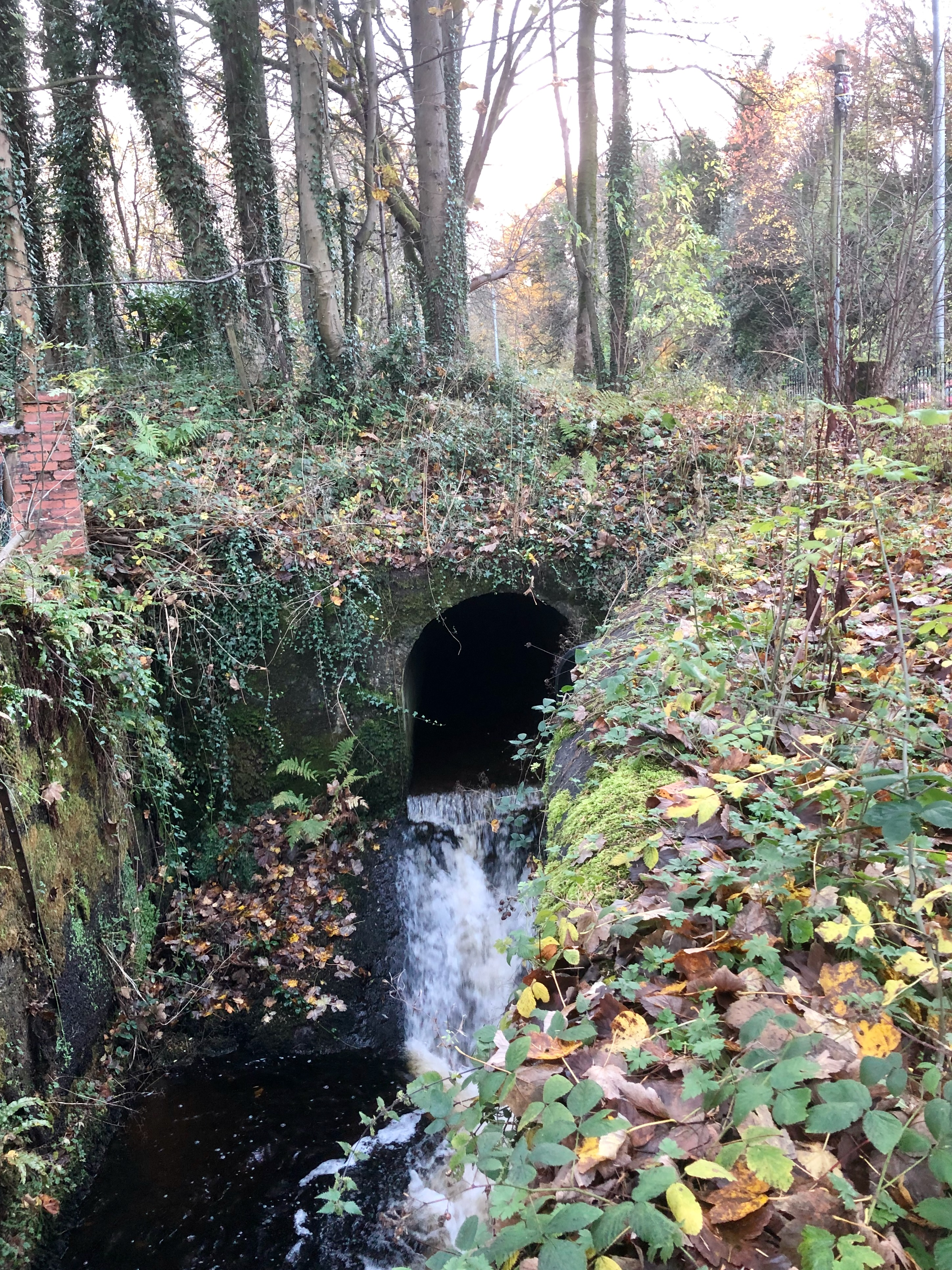
Culvert to channel

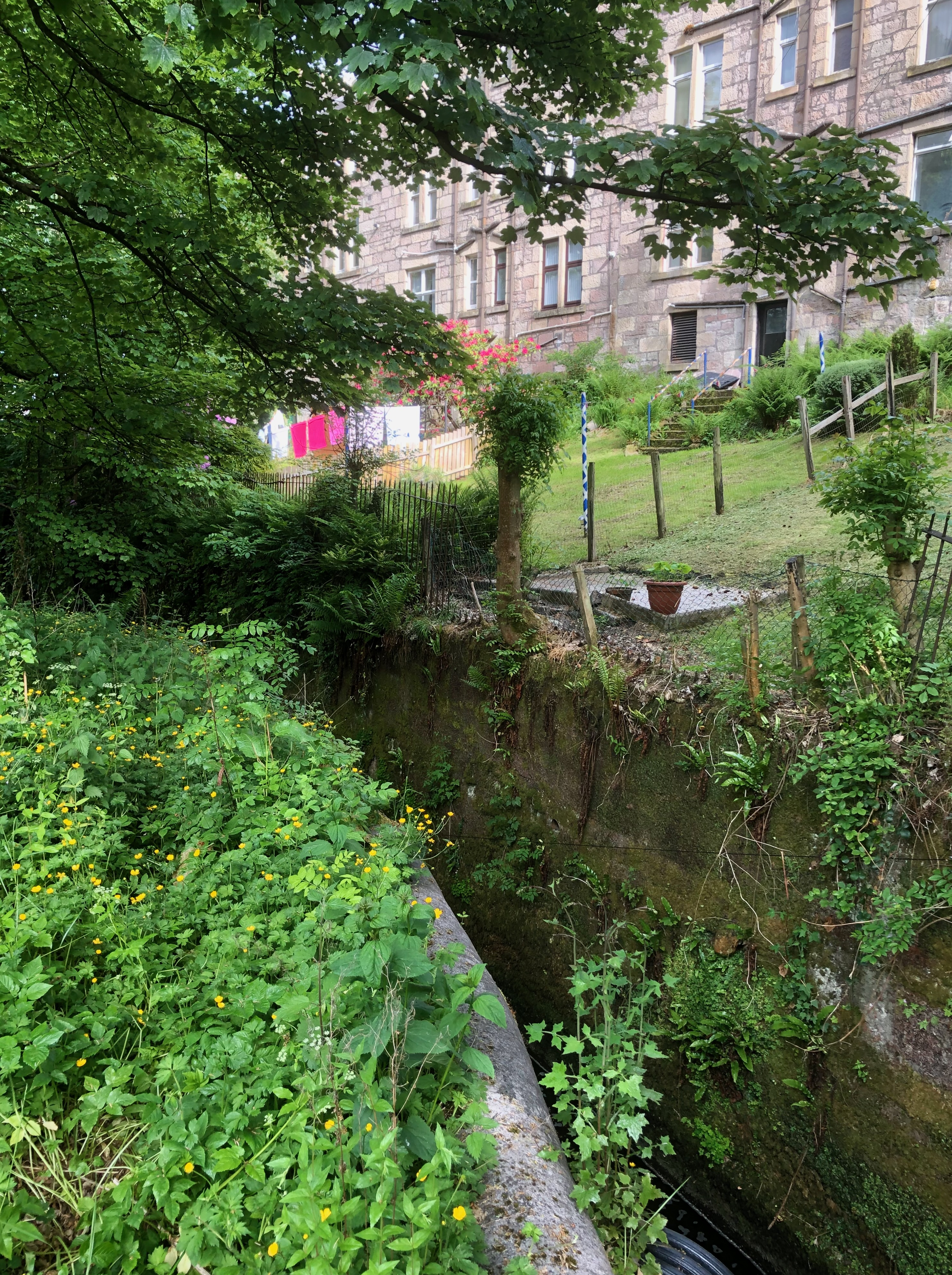
Deep channel past Brachelston Street back gardens

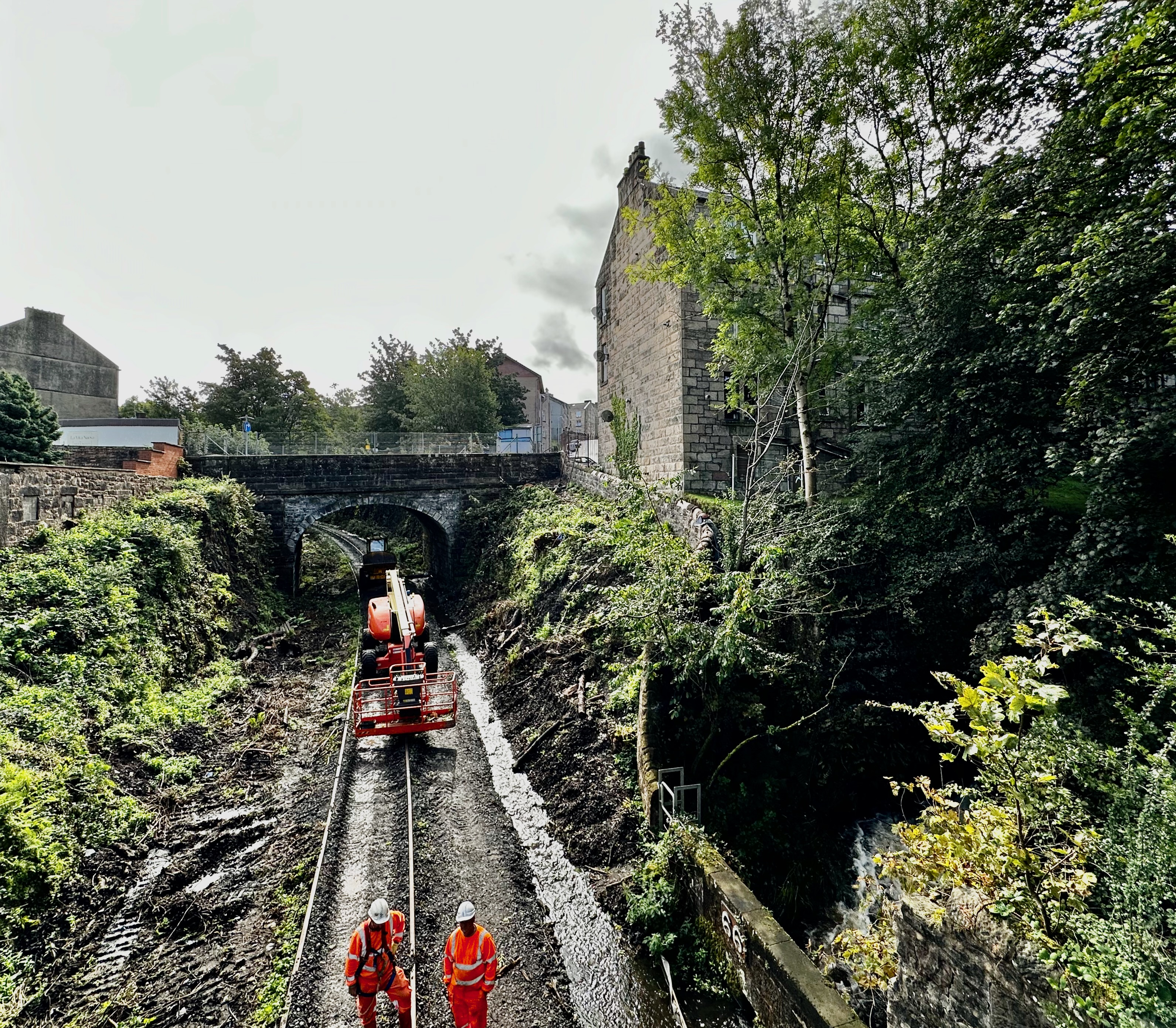
Brachelston Street bridge, river culverted under railway

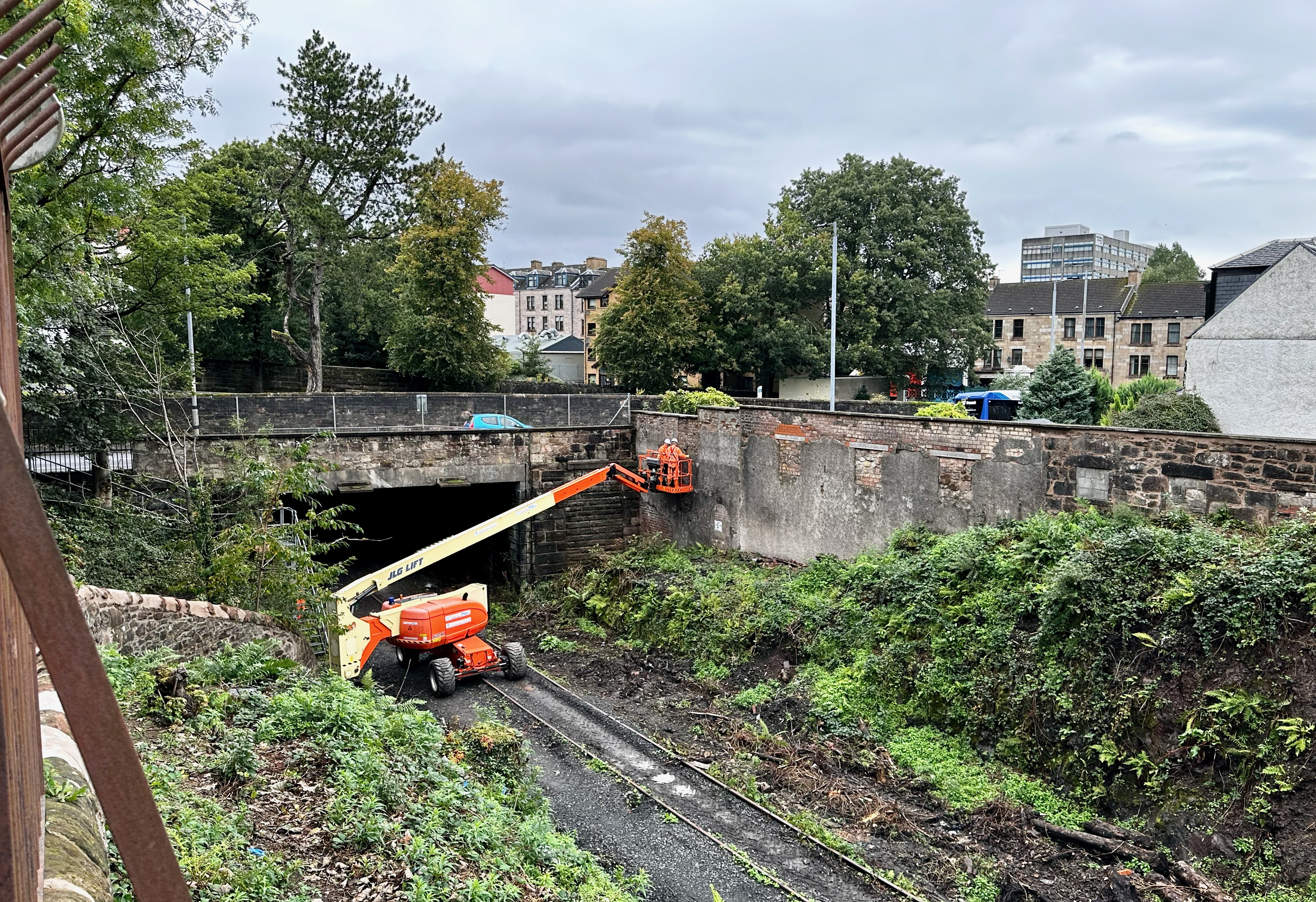
West Burn culvert at Inverkip Road railway bridge, seen from Brachelston Street

=== Brachelston Square, Inverkip Street, West Station, Westburn Church, Kilblain ===
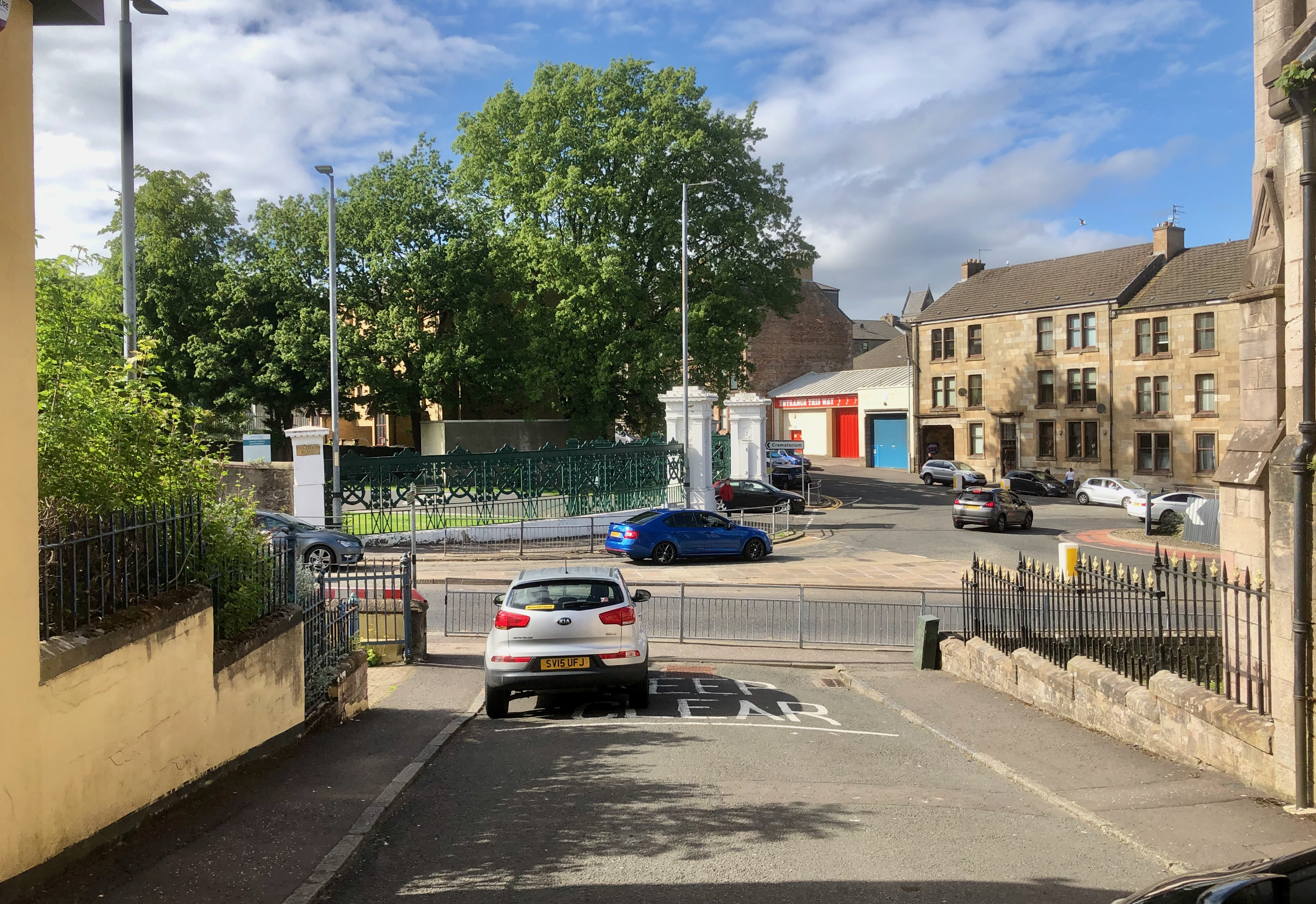
Brachelston Square, West Burn culverted under Inverkip Road roundabout

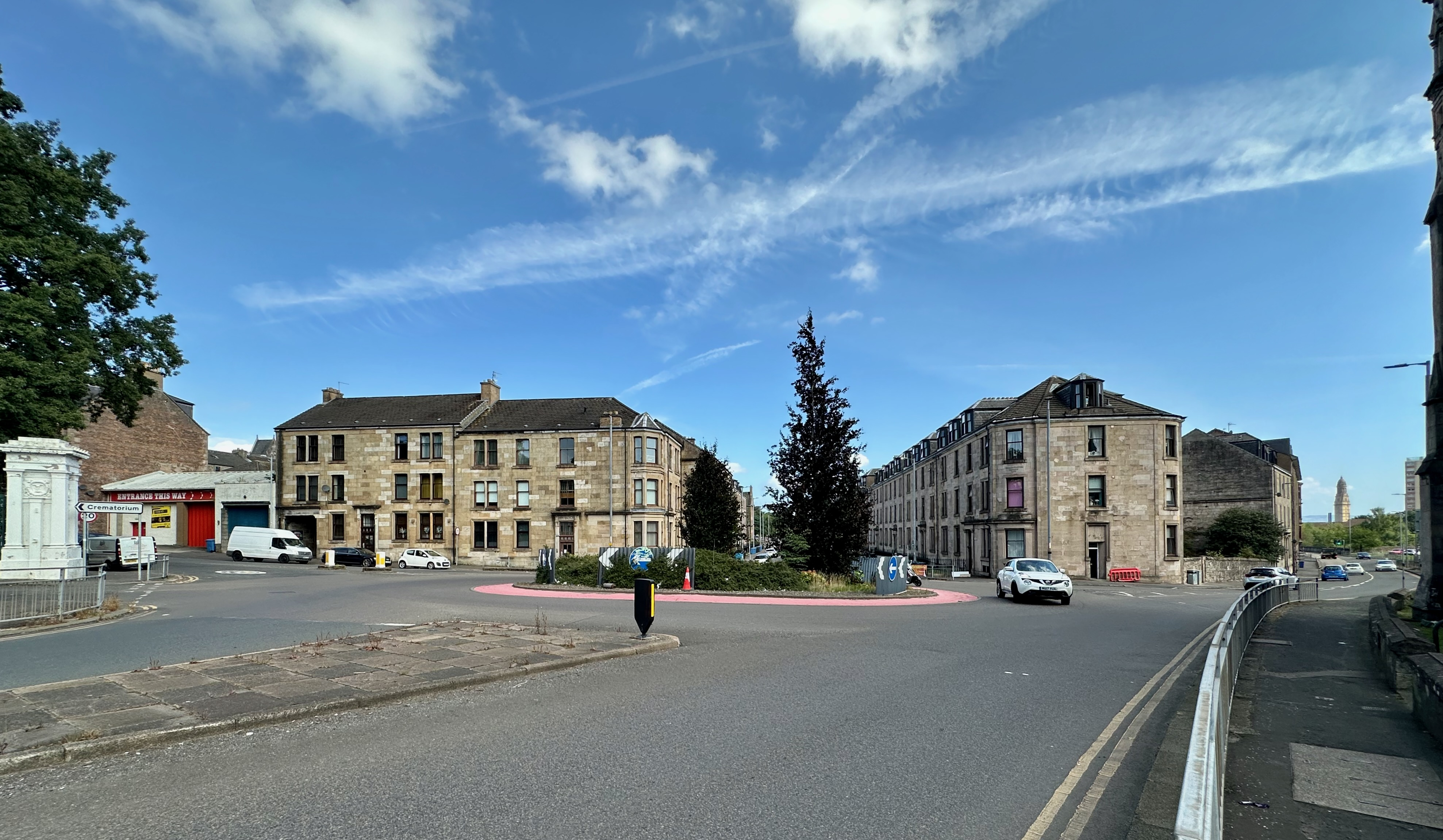
Brachelston Square – South Street, Nelson Street, Inverkip Street, The Albany

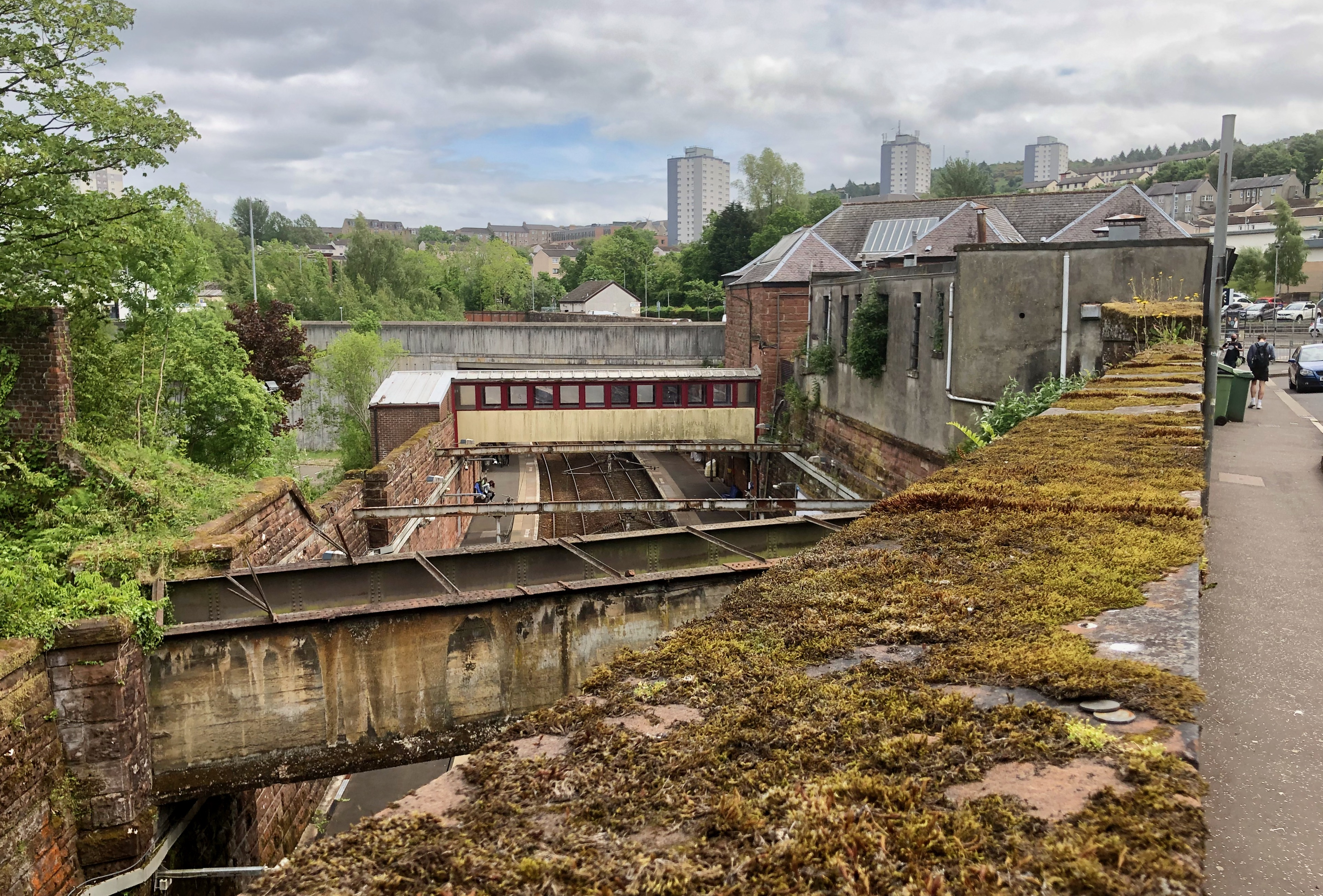
Newton Street, aqueduct and footbridge above platforms

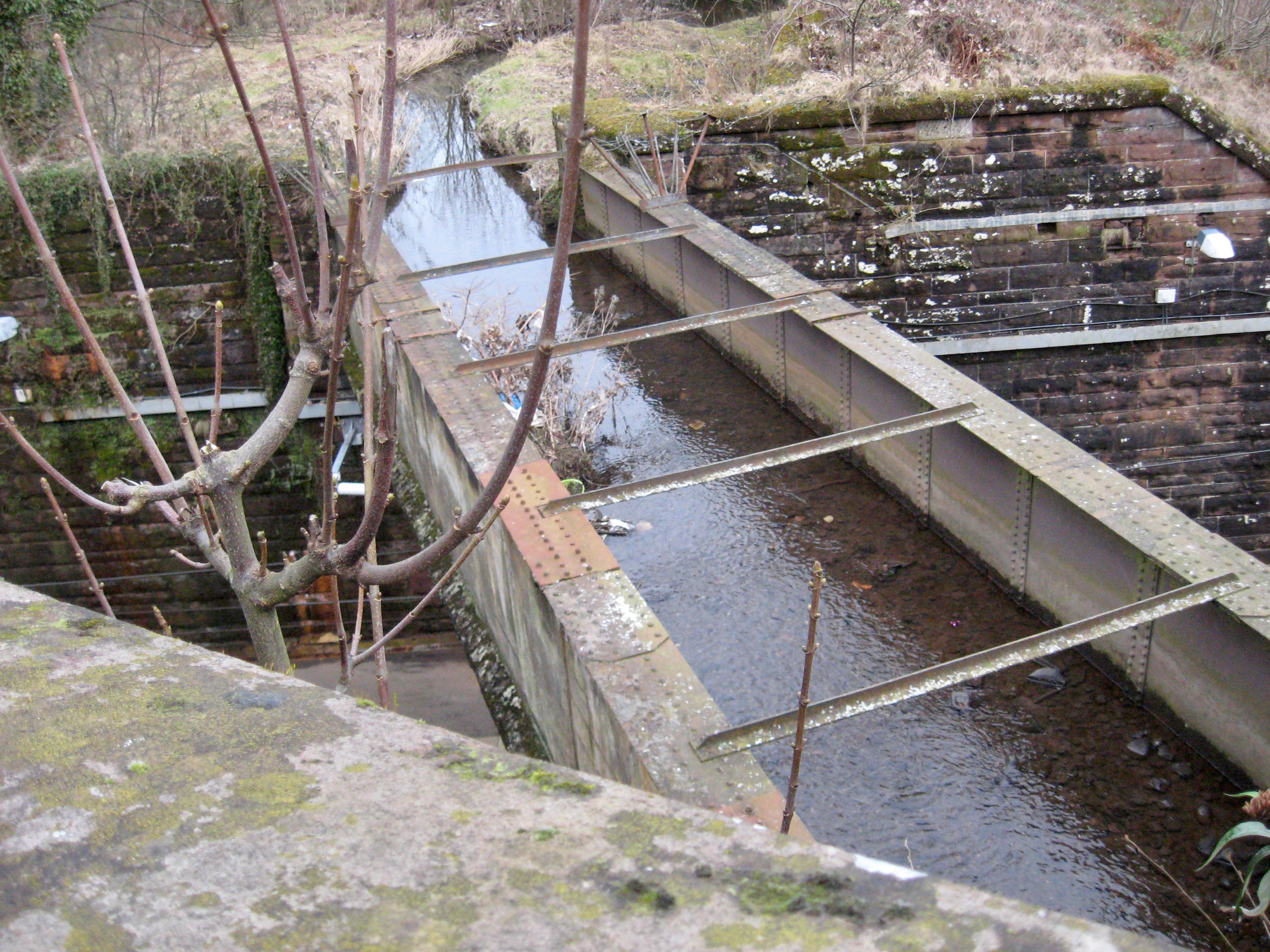
Aqueduct over railway to mill pond

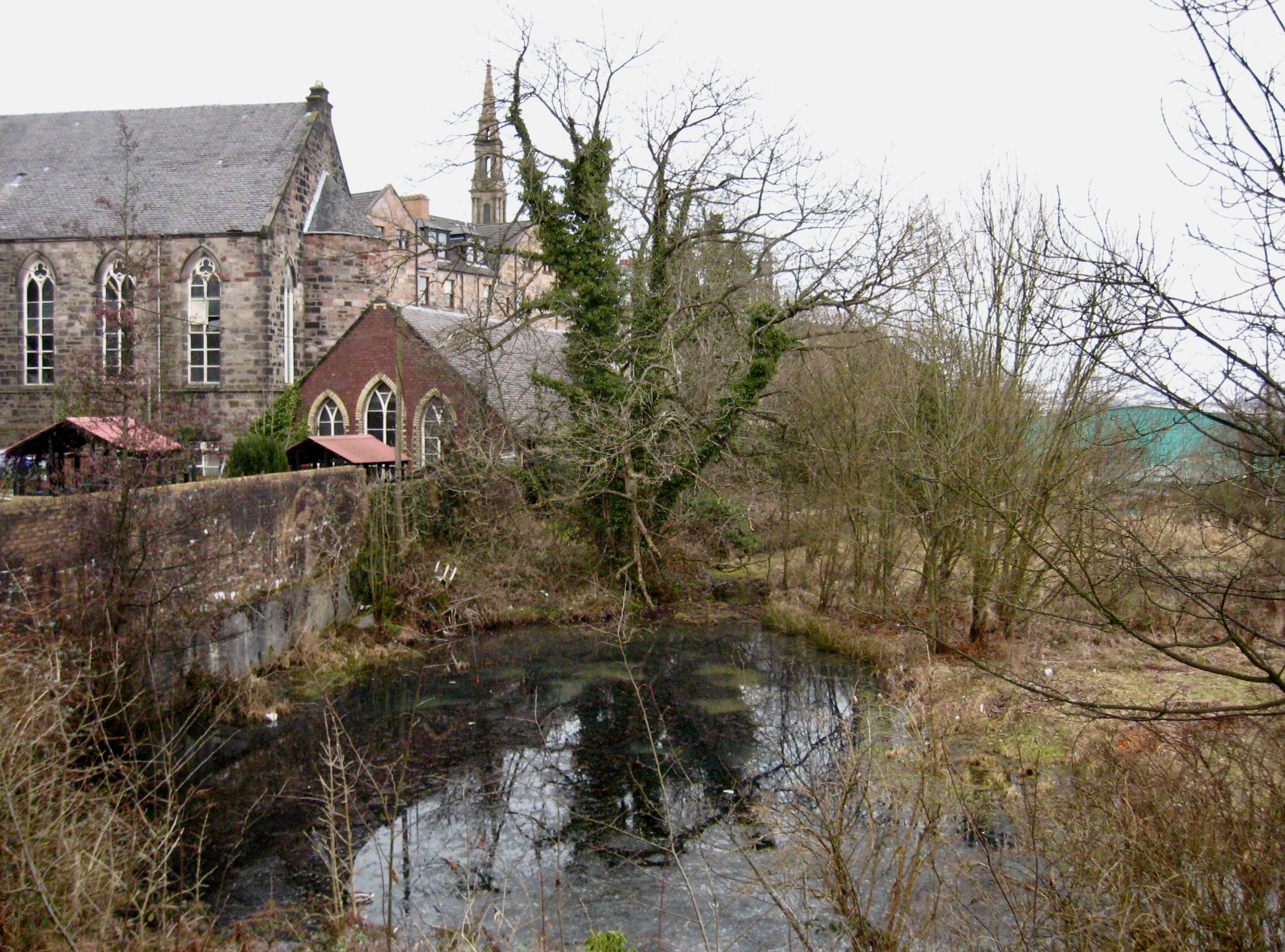
Mill pond, churches on Nelson Street

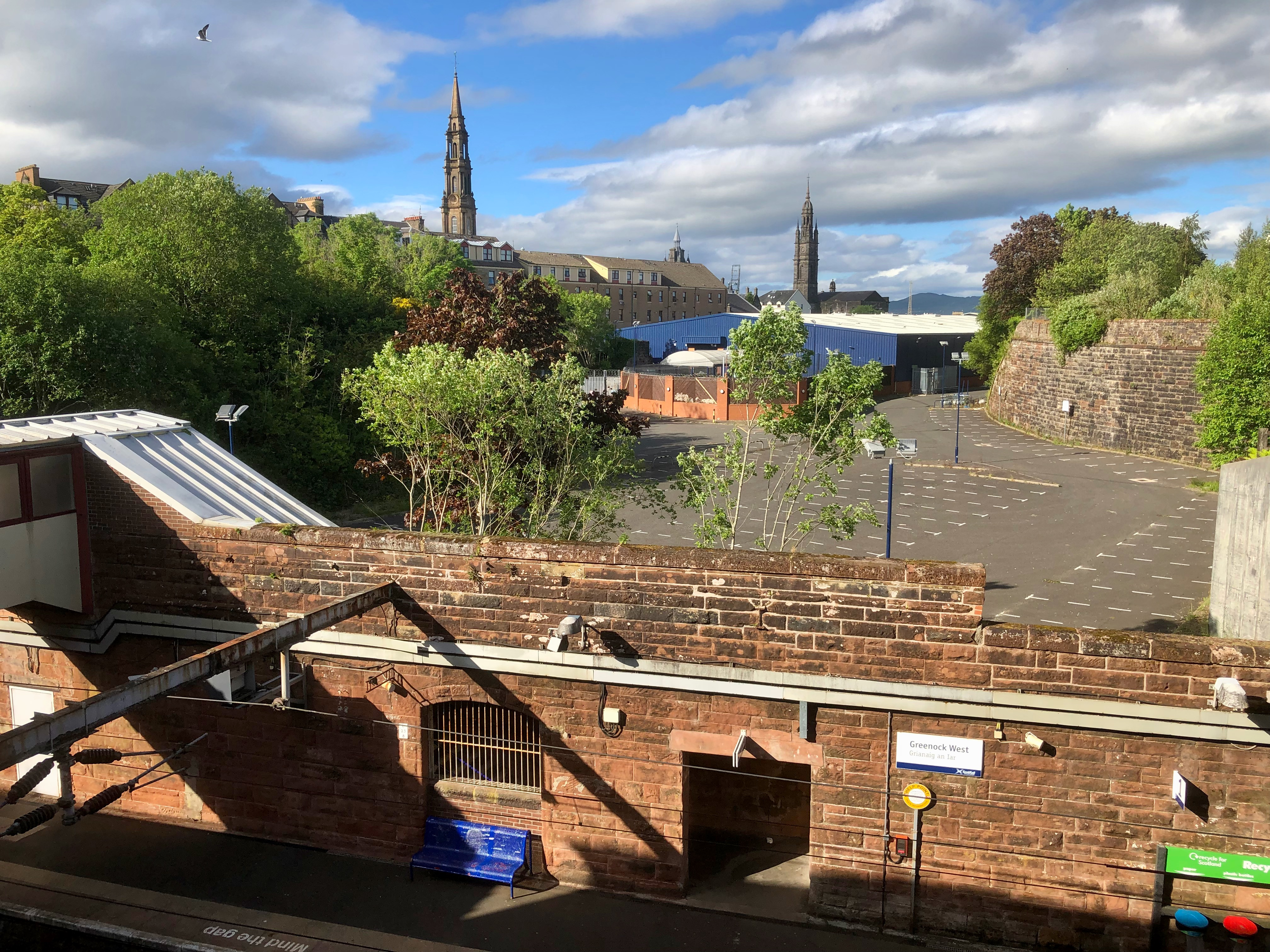
West Station former sidings, Westburn Church on Nelson Street

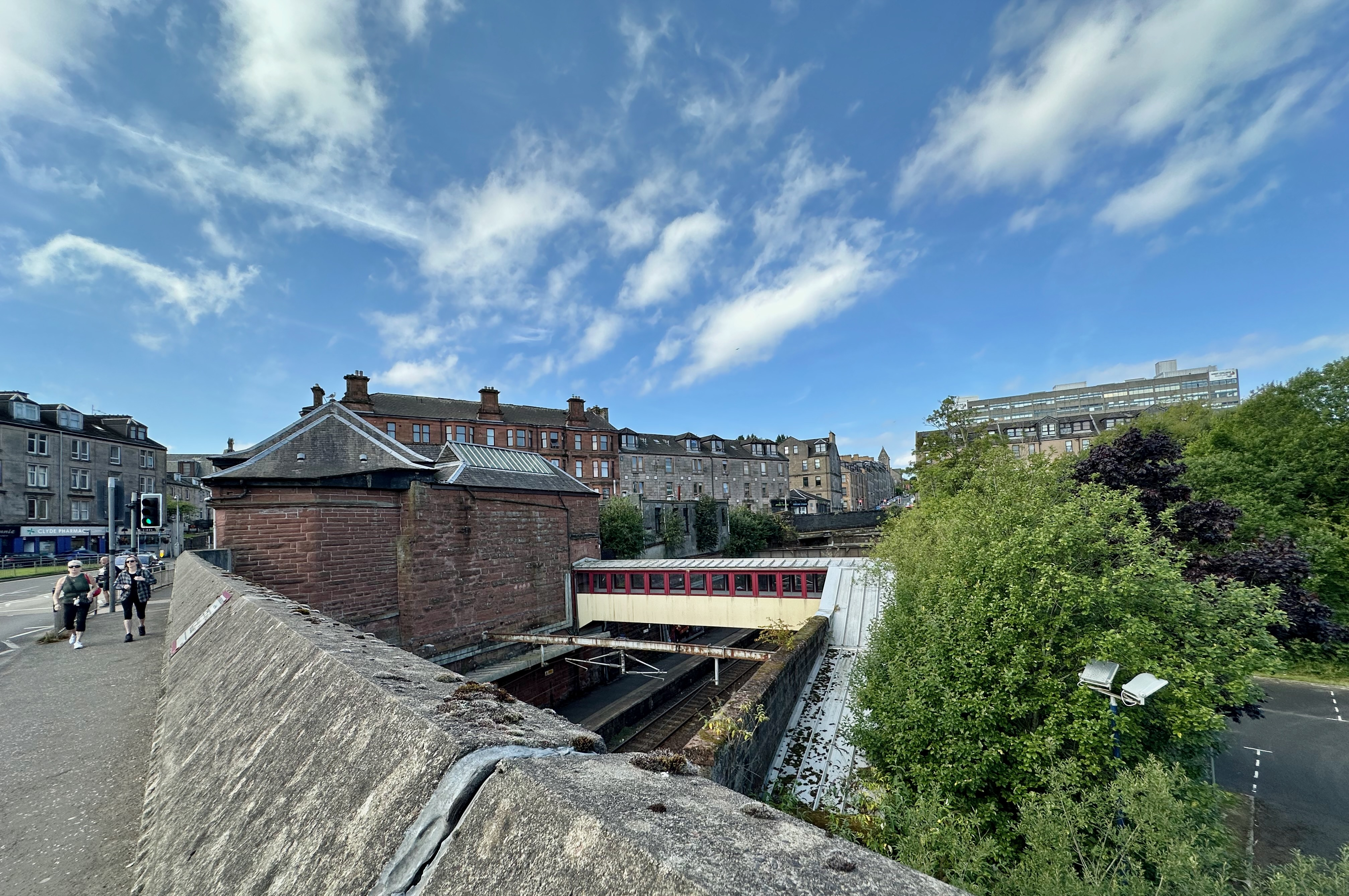
Inverkip Street, West Station, sidings area now car park

Walker's multi-storey sugar refinery replaced by The Range retailers

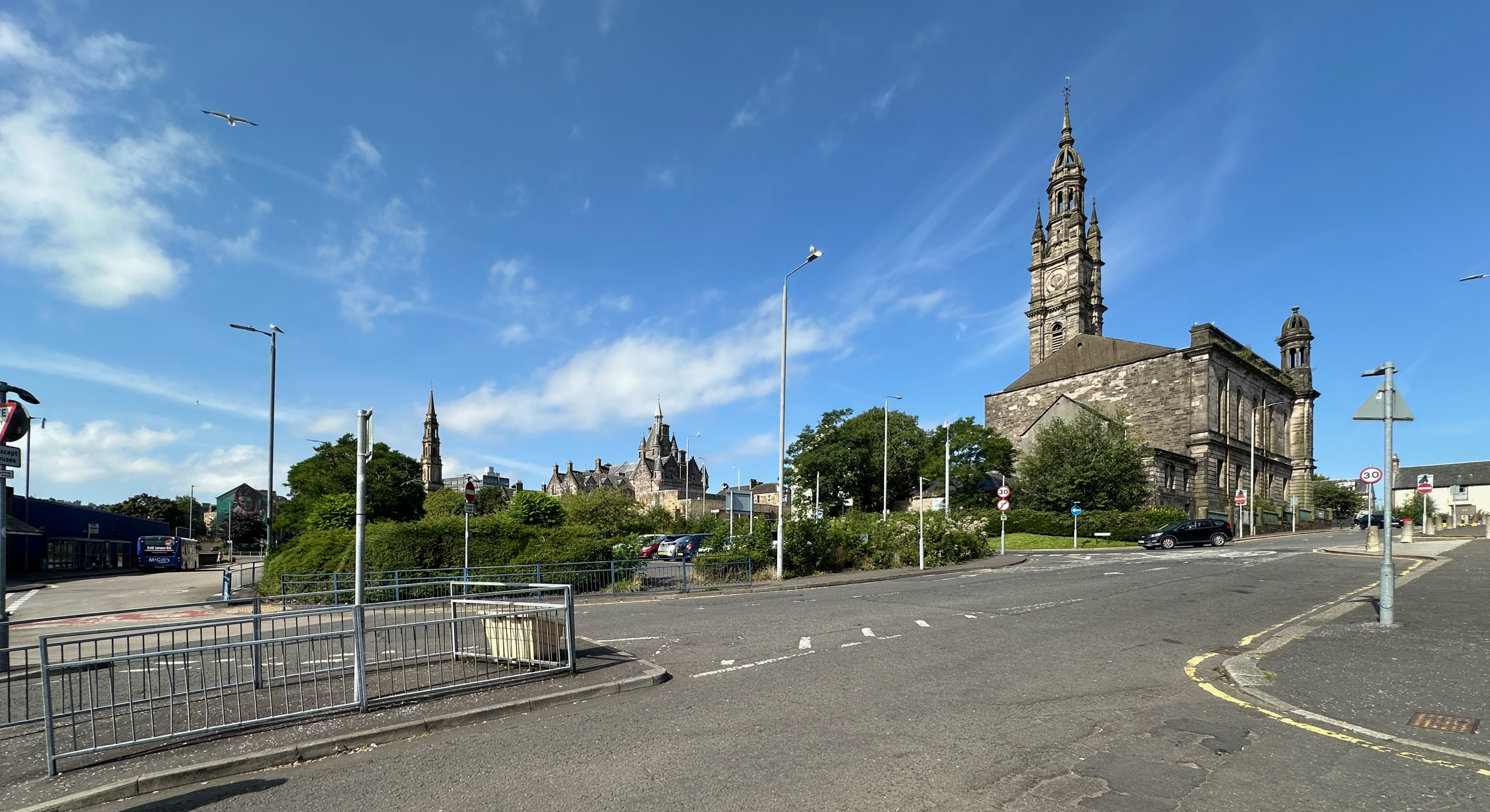
Kilblain Street view Nicolson St, Hastie's, St George's, George Square

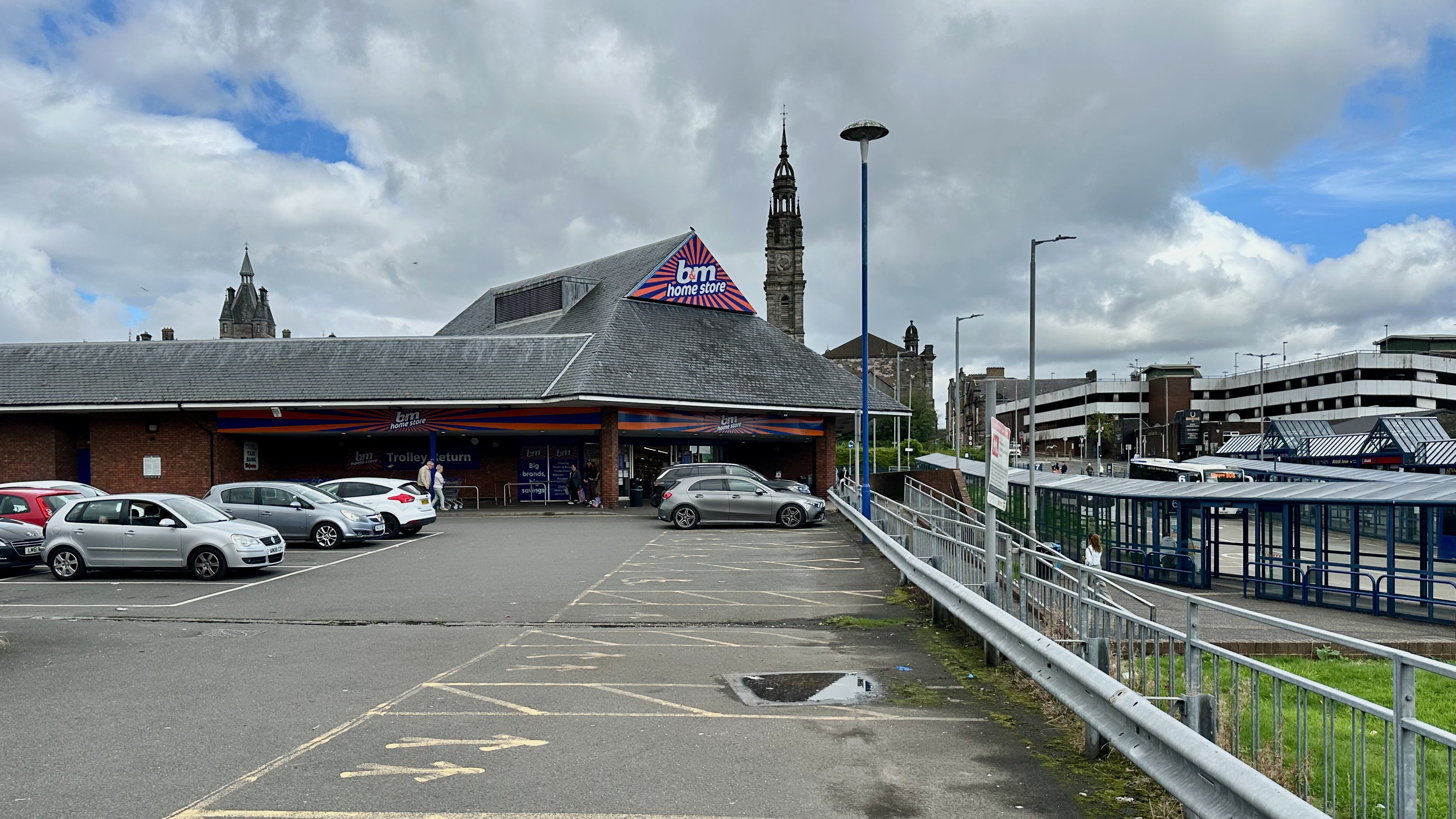
Kilblain Street b&m home store, St George's, Greenock bus station stances

=== West Burn Street, Westburn Shipyard site, RAF Greenock, Ocean Terminal ===
The burn flowed beside this street, Tesco occupies the shipyard site

From Tesco, view to Kilblain Court, and Westburn Building

Sign where the Old West Kirk stood

Waterfront, Custom House Way past Greenock Ocean Terminal building

Piers supporting rail tracks subdivided slipways, two were made into viewing platforms

RAF Greenock defence pillbox on pier

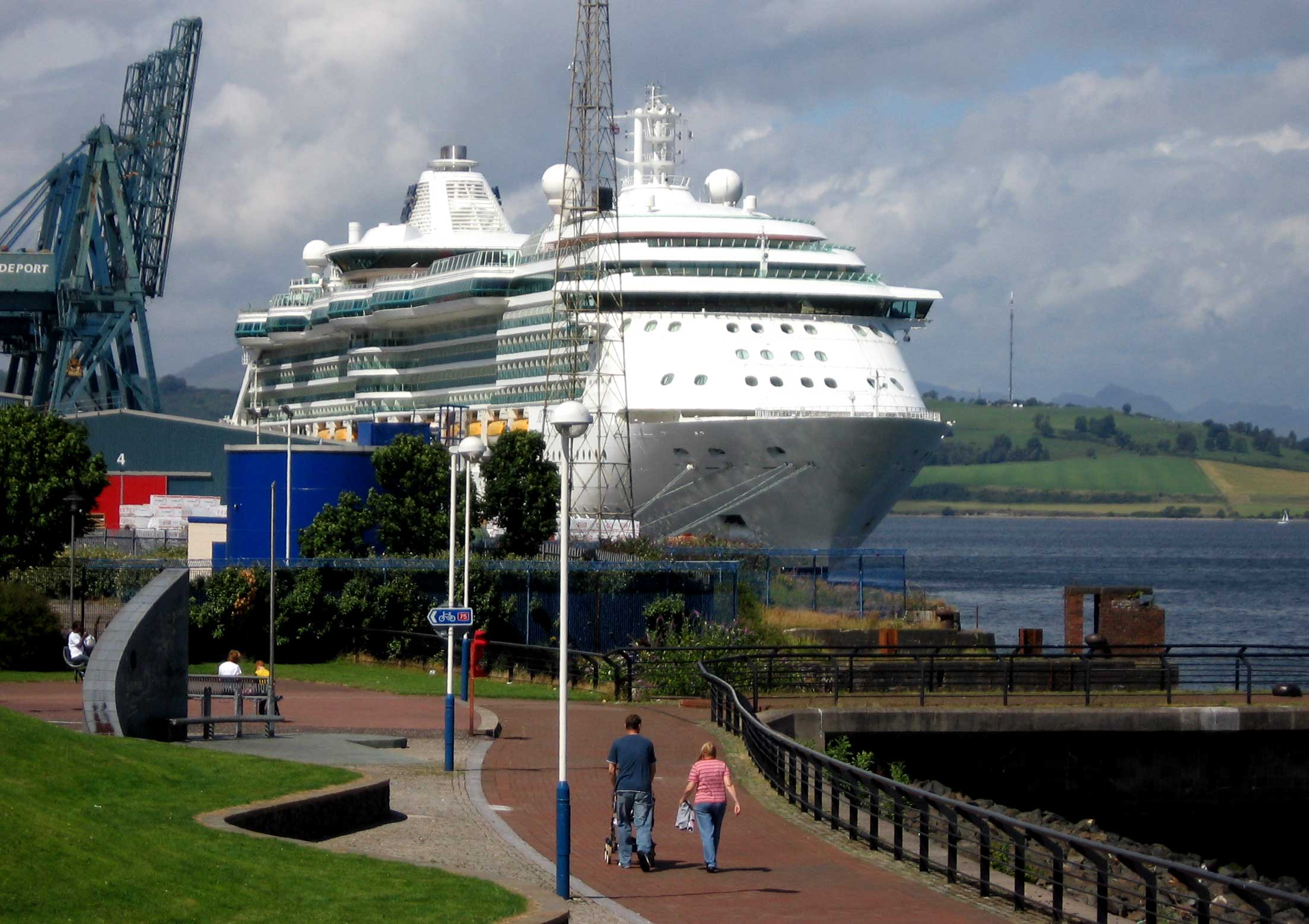
Riverside walkway in 2006, viewing platform on West Burn culvert

Fence at Cinema stops access to the former viewpoint on the West Burn culvert

Pier to east, viewing platform in use

Waterfront, Ocean Terminal

Waterfront pathway

Ocean Terminal forecourt
