= James Burns, 3rd Baron Inverclyde =

British businessman (1864–1919)

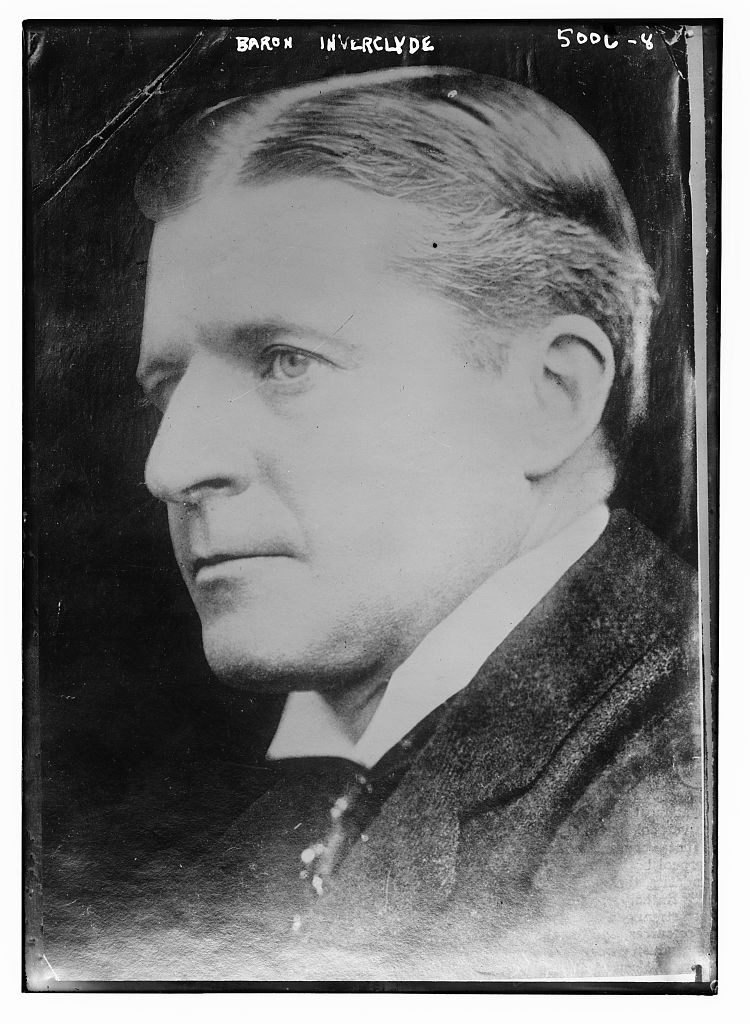
James Burns, 3rd Baron Inverclyde in 1919

James Cleland Burns, 3rd Baron Inverclyde, (14 February 1864 – 16 August 1919) was the second son of John Burns, the first Lord Inverclyde, and grandson of Sir George Burns, 1st Baronet, a founder of the Cunard Line. James Burns succeeded to the title of Baron Inverclyde on the death of his elder brother, George Burns, in 1905.

== Biography ==
James, Lord Inverclyde, was descended from a long line of prominent Glaswegians. One great-grandfather, Dr. Burns, was minister of the Barony Parish for sixty-nine years, from 1770, while another, Dr. Cleland, was a magistrate of the city, and in 1807 laid the foundation stone of St George's Church. His grand-uncle, James, and his grandfather, Sir George Burns, Bart., were founders not only of the service of Irish steamers and of the West Highland service, but of the Cunard Line. His father, Sir John Burns, Bart., had the public services of his house recognised with a peerage in 1897 and became the first Lord Inverclyde.

James Burns was born at Glasgow in 1864, and educated at Repton. He was the principal Director of the shipping business of Messrs. G. & J. Burns, Limited, and took a strong interest in everything connected with shipping. He was President of the Chamber of Shipping of the United Kingdom in 1899.

In 1900, he became Chairman of the Glasgow Shipowners' Association, and was an Honorary Member of the Advisory Committee on New Lighthouse Works to the Board of Trade. He was a Director of the Cunard Steamship Co., Ltd., and of the Clydesdale Bank Ltd. He was a member of the Glasgow Committee of Lloyd's Register, a representative of Glasgow on the London General Committee of Lloyds' Register, and a Director of the Clyde Steamship Owners' Association.

He was an Associate of the Institute of Naval Architects and of the Scottish Institute of Engineers and Shipbuilders. He was also involved in the religious and philanthropic life of the city. He became Prime Warden Shipwright of The Worshipful Company of Shipwrights in 1919, dying in office.

He was an enthusiastic yachtsman. He was Commodore of the Royal Clyde Yacht Club, Vice-Commodore of the Royal Northern Yacht Club and the Royal Highland Yacht Club, and a member of the Royal Yacht Squadron. After Christopher Furness, 1st Baron Furness died in November 1912, Lord Inverclyde acquired his steam yacht Emerald and renamed her Beryl. However, she was destroyed by fire in Gare Loch in December 1913.

He was President of the Scottish Hockey Association, and took a leading part in bringing the game into vogue in Scotland. He distinguished himself as a cricketer and lawn tennis player, and, as President of the Lorne Curling Club, taking a rink to Carsbreck bonspiel every winter.

He owned the estate of Wemyss Bay, and had as his residence there Castle Wemyss. In addition to the ground belonging to his own house of Hartfield at Cove, he leased the shooting on Rosneath moor above from the Duke of Argyll. Lord Inverclyde was Lord Lieutenant of Dunbartonshire, and a Justice of the Peace for the counties of Lanark, Renfrew, and the County of the City of Glasgow. He was appointed Honorary Colonel of the Clyde Royal Garrison Artillery of the Territorial Force on 27 March 1909.

== Family ==
He married on 2 April 1891, Charlotte Mary Emily, youngest daughter of Mr Nugent-Dunbar of Machermore Castle, Newton Stewart, and had two daughters, Emily and Muriel, and a son, John Alan Burns, who succeeded him.

=== Vanity Fair ===
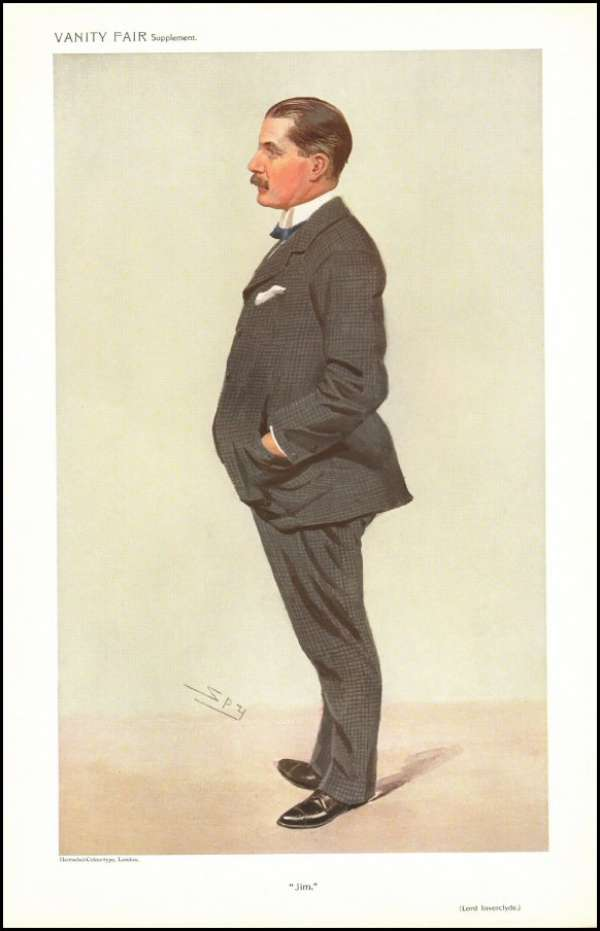
"Jim" Lord Inverclyde as caricatured by "Spy" (Leslie Ward) in Vanity Fair, April 1909

On 21 April 1909, his caricature appeared in Vanity Fair, accompanied by the following biography-

"Men of the Day No.1168
Lord Inverclyde
Of the public details of Lord Inverclyde's life there is little to be said. After leaving Repton he went into business with messrs. G. and J. Burns, of Glasgow, and began to acquire that intimate knowledge of shipping affairs which, at a later stage in his career, made him known in the House of Lords as the Representative of Shipping. As a director of the Cunard Steamship Company, Limited, he has shown decided ability, and it is rumoured that reasonably fresh eggs will shortly be procurable on the Company's liners. If Lord Inverclyde could achieve such a reform he would deserve well of us, but we have travelled by the Cunarders for many years, and dare not vouch for the story.
Lord Inverclyde has at no time figured prominently in municipal matters, being doubtless deterred by the displays of hooliganism for which Glasgow municipal gatherings have, of lat years, been notorious. He holds a number of posts, however, in which he serves with quiet distinction, and, as Lord Lieutenant of Dumbarton, has done excellent service towards the preservation of Dumbarton Castle, which surmounts the bald and precipitous dome of rock in the Clyde.
He is of sturdy habit, fond of all outdoor sports, and would like to divide his year into two seasons, one for curling and one for tennis, did not yachts and guns, in their season, shake his constancy. He is a member of the King's Bodyguard for Scotland, has a covered tennis court and a grouse moor, and a delightful residence at Castle Wemyss on the Firth of Clyde.
He is a Unionist Tariff Reformer, because he can't help it, and is incurably modest."

Peerage of the United Kingdom
Preceded by George Burns	Baron Inverclyde; 1905–1919	Succeeded by John Burns
