= Alan Burns, 4th Baron Inverclyde =

British nobleman and army officer (1897–1957)

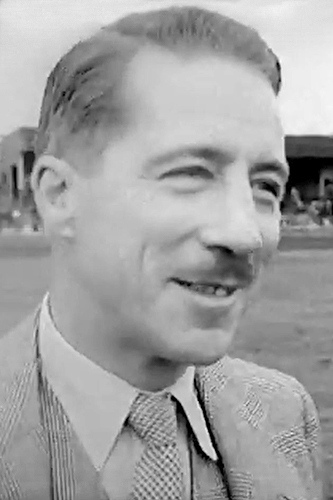

John Alan Burns, 4th Baron Inverclyde of Castle Wemyss, KStJ (12 December 1897 – 17 June 1957) was a Scottish nobleman, the son of James, 3rd Lord Inverclyde, and Charlotte Mary Emily (née Nugent-Dunbar).

== Education ==
He was educated at Eton College and the Royal Military College in Berkshire.

== Military career ==
Joining the Scots Guards, he was wounded by a German bullet while going 'over the top' in France. He reached the rank of lieutenant in the First World War. As a subaltern in the Scots Guards, he fought in France until wounded by a bullet through the palm of one hand. Gangrene impeded swift healing, but at last he was ready to return to the front and confided in a friend that if he had to die for it, he would try to win a decoration for gallantry in action to make his father proud of him. But instead of being sent overseas he was shunted into a 'cushy' job at the War Office.

During the Second World War he served in France as a captain in the Scots Guards and as ADC to the General Officer Commanding Lines of Communication before being evacuated from St Nazaire.

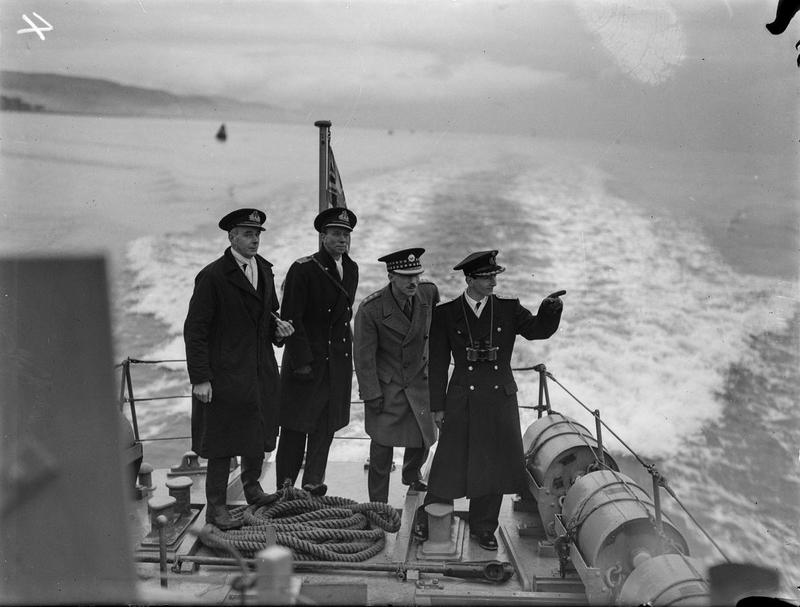
Lord Inverclyde (second from right) with King Peter II of Yugoslavia in 1943

He was appointed Honorary Colonel of the newly formed 74th (City of Glasgow) Heavy Anti-Aircraft Regiment, Royal Artillery, in the Territorial Army on 11 January 1939, and held the position until 1944. Inverclyde was on board the RMS Lancastria when she was sunk off St Nazaire on 17 June 1940. He was rescued by the crew of HMT Cambridgeshire, a 443-ton anti-submarine trawler, which had been requisitioned by the navy in August 1939; she was then given a 4-inch gun, machine guns and depth charges, she herself surviving the war and, after returning to peacetime trawling in 1945 as the Kingstone Sapphire, was scrapped in 1954.

After returning to England, Inverclyde presented each of his rescuers with a round rosewood box full of cigarettes, each box with an engraved silver plaque, each individually named and then given the wording "... HMS Cambridgeshire, St Nazaire to Plymouth, 17 to 19 June 1940, from a grateful passenger, Inverclyde/Scots Guards".

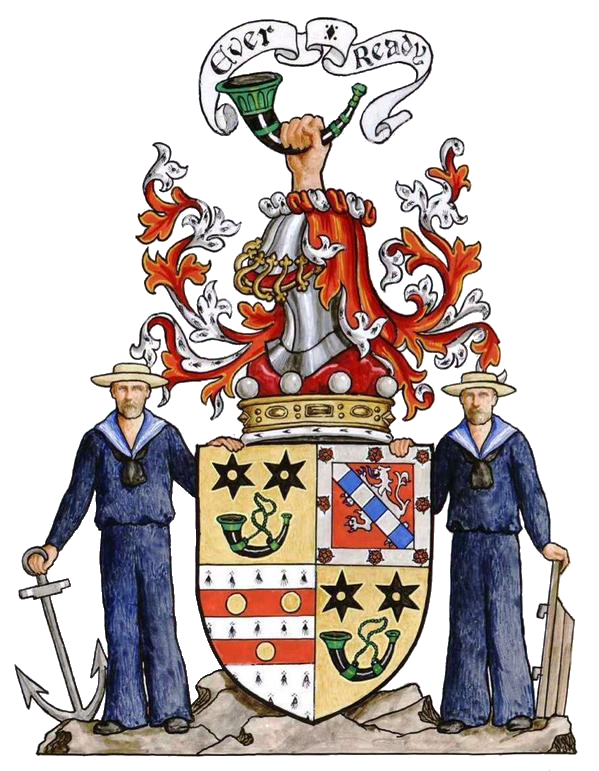
Arms of Lord Inverclyde

Burns succeeded as Lord Inverclyde on the death of his father on 16 August 1919, and inherited Castle Wemyss at Wemyss Bay in the County of Renfrew. He was invested as a Knight of the Venerable Order of Saint John and admitted to the Royal Company of Archers.

== Post-military career ==
Not having inherited any business acumen from his immediate forebears, he eschewed the idea of taking an active role in the running of the Cunard Steamship Company and preferred instead the pleasant job of aide-de-camp to the Governor of Gibraltar, 1920–21. Inverclyde became a lieutenant in the Reserve of Officers, and in 1922 was Assistant Private Secretary, in an unpaid capacity, to the Secretary of State for Scotland.

After leaving his regiment, he retired into private life as master of Wemyss and man-about-town with a bachelor flat in Mayfair. He acquired hunters, a yacht, and a grouse moor.

During the winter he rode with the Eglinton in Ayrshire; in the early summer months he cruised the Mediterranean; in the late summer and early autumn he shot grouse. His civic duties were not obligatory and, according to his second wife, June, he never took more than cursory interest in local matters. He did, however, endow two public buildings which remain in use: the Inverclyde National Sports Training Centre at Largs and the Inverclyde Centre in Greenock as a British Sailors Society home, now used by the local authority's homeless persons unit. He was chairman of the British Sailors' Society in Scotland for 18 years.

After the war, he unveiled the Free French Memorial in 1946 and was awarded Officer of the French Legion of Honour. In 1955, the French Ambassador to the Court of St James promoted Alan to Commander. He was also awarded the Medal of French Gratitude, the medal of the city of Nancy (which he visited in 1949), honorary citizenship of the towns of Brest and Veulettes-sur-Mer, and an honorary doctorate of the University of Dijon.

He was president of the Franco-Scottish Society (1949–54), chairman of Friends of France Council for Glasgow and West of Scotland (1942–57) and an honorary member of the Association des Français libres.

== Personal life ==
He married, firstly, Olive Sylvia Sainsbury, daughter of Arthur Sainsbury, millionaire owner of the J Sainsbury chain of grocery shops, on 23 November 1926. They divorced in Scotland in 1928. She went on to marry the racehorse trainer Captain James Townsend Pearce.

Secondly, he married June Howard-Tripp, daughter of Walter Howard-Tripp, on 21 March 1929. She had been a well established star of revue and silent films, but gave up her showbusiness career on marriage, although this too was to end in divorce, in 1933.

== Death ==
Inverclyde died on 17 June 1957, at the age of 59, without issue, the title becoming extinct on his death. The name Inverclyde was however resurrected in the early 1970s for the new local authority district centred on Greenock, a creation of the Local Government (Scotland) Act 1973. The local newspaper, the Greenock Telegraph, said that the name "would in a way be a tribute to a man whose interest in the area was always constant". Inverclyde remains as a Scottish council area.

== Publications ==
Inverclyde published a memoir of two cruises: on the steam yacht the Sapphire, which belonged to the mother of his friend Huttleston Broughton, to India and Malaya in 1924/25, and on his own steam yacht the Beryl around the Mediterranean in 1929. Entitled Porpoises and People, it was published in 1930.

== Bibliography ==
- Lord Inverclyde, Porpoises and People, Halton & Truscott Smith 1930

Peerage of the United Kingdom
Preceded by James Burns	Baron Inverclyde; 1919 – 1957	Extinct
