= Inverclyde (disambiguation) =

Inverclyde is a council area (and former district) of Scotland. It may also refer to:

- Inverclyde (UK Parliament constituency) — a constituency represented in the House of Commons of the United Kingdom
  - Greenock and Inverclyde (UK Parliament constituency) — predecessor constituency of the above
  - Renfrew West and Inverclyde (UK Parliament constituency) — predecessor constituency of part of the above
- Inverclyde (Scottish Parliament constituency) — constituency represented in the Scottish Parliament
  - Greenock and Inverclyde (Scottish Parliament constituency) — predecessor constituency of the above
- Inverclyde Line — a railway branch line serving the southern bank of the River Clyde, Scotland
- Inverclyde National Sports Training Centre — an elite sports training facility in Largs, North Ayrshire operated by Sportscotland
- Inverclyde Royal Hospital, a district general hospital in Greenock
- Baron Inverclyde — an extinct barony in the Peerage of the United Kingdom
