= Inverclyde =

Council area of Scotland

Inverclyde: Inbhir Chluaidh (Scottish Gaelic); Inerclyde (Scots)
- Council area
- Coat of arms

- Inverclyde shown within Scotland
- Coordinates: 55°54′N 4°45′W
- Sovereign state: United Kingdom
- Country: Scotland
- Lieutenancy area: Renfrewshire
- Unitary authority: 1 April 1996
- Administrative HQ: Greenock Municipal Buildings

Government
  - Type: Council
  - Body: Inverclyde Council
  - Control: No overall control
  - MPs: Martin McCluskey (L)
  - MSPs: 2 MSPs: Stuart McMillan (SNP); Natalie Don (SNP)

Area
  - Total: 62 sq mi (160 km^{2})
  - Rank: 29th

Population (2025)
  - Total: 78,550
  - Rank: 28th
  - Density: 1,300/sq mi (490/km^{2})
- Time zone: UTC+0 (GMT)
  - Summer (DST): UTC+1 (BST)
- ISO 3166 code: GB-IVC
- GSS code: S12000018
- Website: inverclyde.gov.uk

Inverclyde (Scots: Inerclyde; Scottish Gaelic: Inbhir Chluaidh, pronounced [iɲiɾʲˈxl̪ˠuəj], "mouth of the Clyde") is one of 32 council areas used for local government in Scotland. Together with the East Renfrewshire and Renfrewshire council areas, Inverclyde forms part of the historic county of Renfrewshire, which currently exists as a registration county and lieutenancy area. Inverclyde is located in the west central Lowlands. It borders the North Ayrshire and Renfrewshire council areas, and is otherwise surrounded by the Firth of Clyde.

Inverclyde was formerly one of nineteen districts within Strathclyde Region, from 1975 until 1996. Prior to 1975, Inverclyde was governed as part of the local government county of Renfrewshire, comprising the burghs of Greenock, Port Glasgow and Gourock, and the former fifth district of the county. Its landward area is bordered by the Kelly, North and South Routen burns to the southwest (separating Wemyss Bay and Skelmorlie, North Ayrshire), part of the River Gryfe and the Finlaystone Burn to the south-east.

It is one of the smallest in terms of area (29th) and population (28th) out of the 32 Scottish unitary authorities. Along with the council areas clustered around Glasgow it is considered part of Greater Glasgow in some definitions, although it is physically separated from the city area by open countryside and does not share a border with the city.

The name derives from the extinct barony of Inverclyde (1897) conferred upon Sir John Burns of Wemyss Bay and his heirs.

== History ==
Inverclyde was created as a district in 1975 under the Local Government (Scotland) Act 1973, which established a two-tier structure of local government across mainland Scotland comprising upper-tier regions and lower-tier districts. Inverclyde was one of nineteen districts created within the region of Strathclyde. The district covered the area of four former districts from the historic county of Renfrewshire, all of which were abolished at the same time:

- Greenock Burgh
- Gourock Burgh
- Port Glasgow Burgh
- Fifth District, being the landward (outside a burgh) parts of the parishes of Greenock, Inverkip, Port Glasgow, and Kilmacolm.

The new district was named Inverclyde, meaning "mouth of the River Clyde", a name which had been coined in 1897 for the title of Baron Inverclyde which was conferred upon John Burns of Castle Wemyss, a large house at Wemyss Bay. The remaining parts of Renfrewshire were divided between the Eastwood and Renfrew districts. The three districts together formed a single lieutenancy area.

In 1996 the districts and regions were replaced with unitary council areas under the Local Government etc. (Scotland) Act 1994. In the debates leading up to that act, the government initially proposed replacing these three districts with two council areas: "West Renfrewshire", covering Inverclyde district and the western parts of Renfrew district, and "East Renfrewshire", covering Eastwood district and the eastern parts of Renfrew district. The proposals were not supported locally, with Inverclyde successfully campaigning to be allowed to form its own council area. The new council areas came into effect on 1 April 1996.

== Settlements ==
The largest settlements in Inverclyde.

Settlements by population:

Settlement	Population (2020)
Greenock	41,280
Port Glasgow	14,200
Gourock	10,210
Kilmacolm	3,930
Inverkip	3,490
Wemyss Bay	2,390
Quarrier's Village	710

== Communities ==
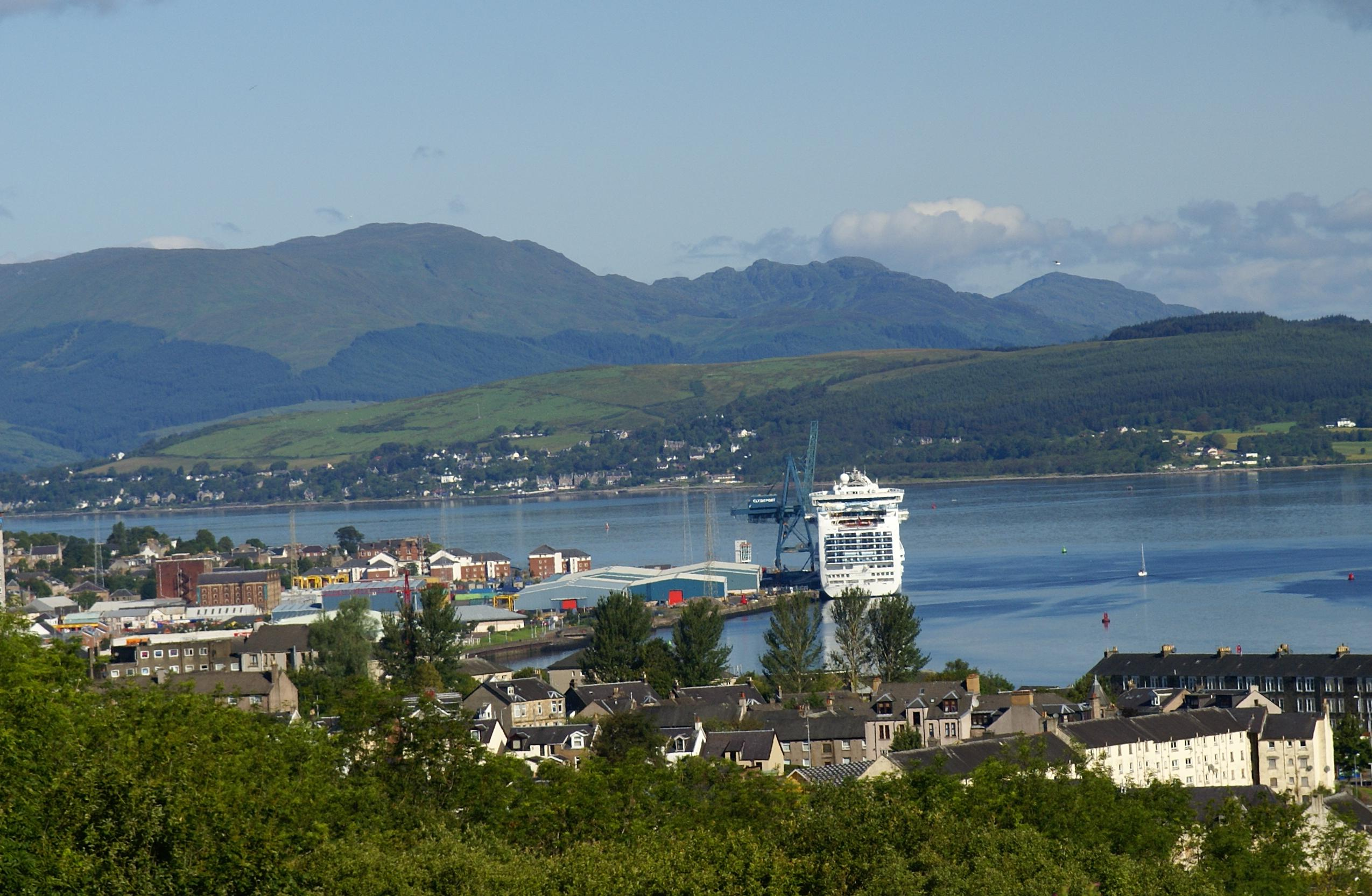
Greenock, the administrative seat of Inverclyde Council.

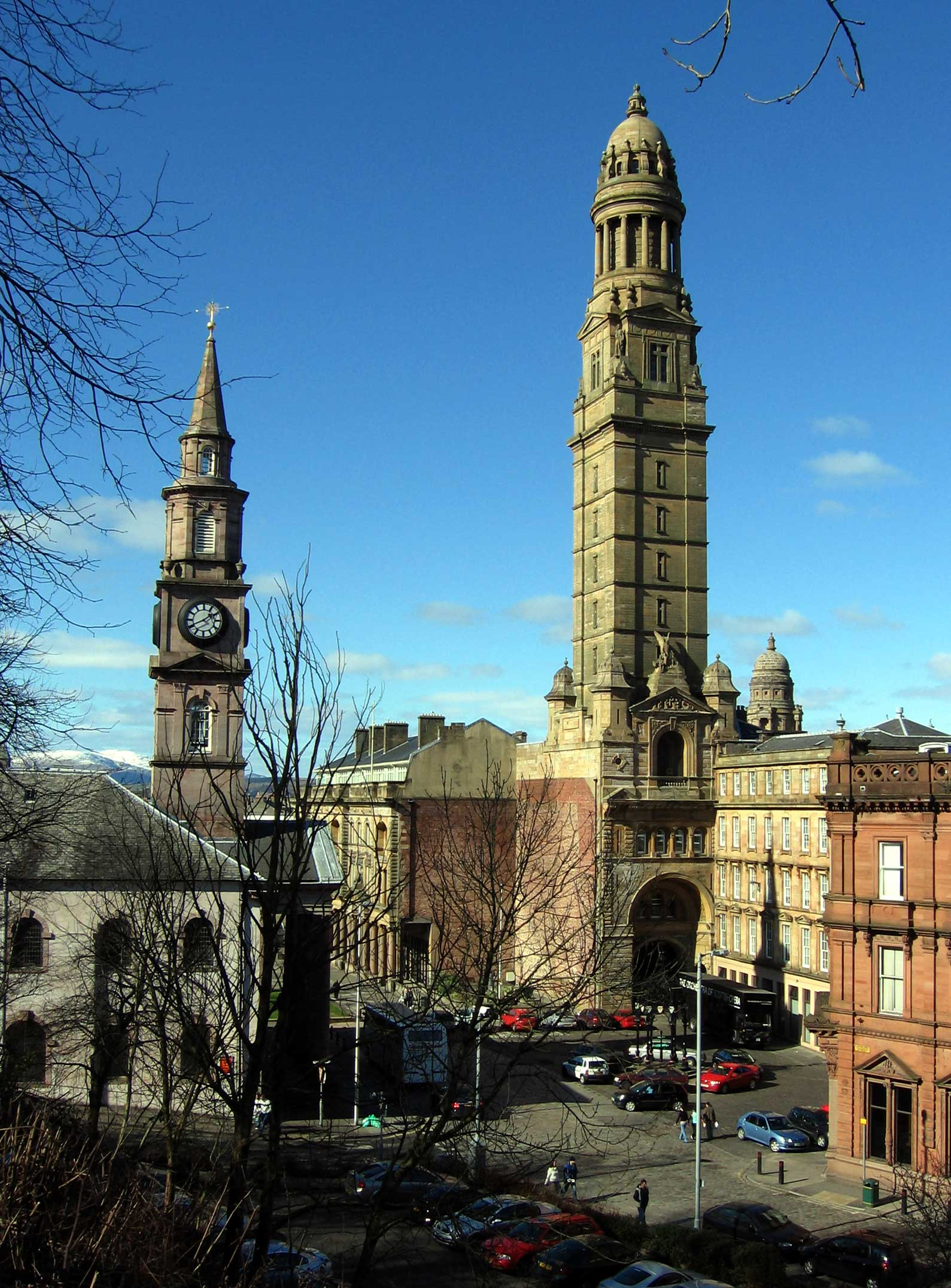
Inverclyde Council is based at Greenock Municipal Buildings.

The area is divided into eleven community council areas, seven of which have community councils as at 2023 (being those with asterisks in the list below):

- Gourock*
- Greenock Central
- Greenock East
- Greenock Southwest*
- Greenock West and Cardwell Bay*
- Holefarm and Cowdenknowes
- Inverkip and Wemyss Bay*
- Kilmacolm*
- Larkfield, Braeside and Branchton*
- Port Glasgow East
- Port Glasgow West*

== Places of interest ==
- Ardgowan Estate
- The Bogal Stone
- Cappielow
- Castle Levan
- Clyde Muirshiel Regional Park
- Greenock Cut Visitor Centre
- Custom House Quay and Museum
- Duchal House
- Finlaystone House
- Gourock Outdoor Pool
- Granny Kempock Stone
- Loch Thom
- Lunderston Bay
- McLean Museum and Art Gallery
- Newark Castle
- Waterfront Leisure Complex

== National voting ==
In the 2014 independence referendum, the "No" vote won in Inverclyde by just 86 votes and a margin of 0.2%. By either measure, this was the narrowest result of any of the 32 council areas. In the 2016 EU Referendum, Inverclyde posted a "Remain" vote of almost 64%.

== Education ==
Inverclyde has twenty primary schools serving all areas of its settlements. These are:

- Aileymill Primary School, Greenock (merger of Larkfield and Ravenscraig primaries)
- All Saints Primary School, Greenock (merger of St. Kenneth's and St. Lawrence's primaries)
- Ardgowan Primary School, Greenock
- Gourock Primary School, Gourock
- Inverkip Primary School, Inverkip
- Kilmacolm Primary School, Kilmacolm/Port Glasgow
- King's Oak Primary School, Greenock (merger of King's Glen and Oakfield primaries)
- Lady Alice Primary School, Greenock
- Moorfoot Primary School, Gourock
- Newark Primary School, Port Glasgow (merger of Boglestone, Clune Park, Highholm and Slaemuir primaries)
- St. Andrew's Primary School, Greenock (merger of Sacred Heart and St. Gabriel's primaries)
- St. Francis' Primary School, Port Glasgow
- St. John's Primary School, Port Glasgow
- St. Joseph's Primary School, Greenock
- St. Mary's Primary School, Greenock
- St. Michael's Primary School, Port Glasgow
- St. Ninian's Primary School, Gourock
- St. Patrick's Primary School, Greenock
- Wemyss Bay Primary School, Wemyss Bay
- Whinhill Primary School, Greenock (merger of Highlanders' Academy and Overton primaries)

These are connected to several Secondary schools which serve Inverclyde as follows:

- Clydeview Academy, serving the West End of Greenock and the town of Gourock
- Inverclyde Academy, serving South and East Greenock as well as the villages of Inverkip and Wemyss Bay
- Notre Dame High School, serving Greenock
- Port Glasgow High School, serving Port Glasgow and Kilmacolm
- St Columba's High School, Gourock/Greenock, serving Gourock, Inverkip and Wemyss Bay
- St. Stephen's High School, serving Port Glasgow, Kilmacolm and the East End of Greenock
- Craigmarloch School which is an Additional Support Needs school for pupils aged 4–18 based at the new Port Glasgow Community Campus after the merging of Glenburn and Lilybank schools.

There is also one private school serving both primary and secondary education: St Columba's School, Kilmacolm

== Demography ==
The average life expectancy for Inverclyde male residents (2013–2015) is 75.4 years, to rank 28th out of the 32 areas in Scotland. The average Inverclyde female lives for 80.4 years, to rank 26th out 32. There are large health disparities between settlements in Inverclyde with many health indicators being above the Scottish average in certain areas, whilst considerably below in others.

In 2019, the Inverclyde Council Area was rated as the most deprived in Scotland by the Scottish Index of Multiple Deprivation (SIMD), with Greenock Town Centre the most deprived community. (The term "deprivation" refers not only to low income according to the BBC, but may also include "fewer resources and opportunities, for example in health and education".) After the announcement, Deputy leader Jim Clocherty said that he hoped that investment money would arrive soon, and that "no part of Scotland wants to be labelled as the 'most deprived'". A £3m investment was scheduled for Greenock Town Centre and there was also a plan to create a new cruise visitor centre with other investment funds being expected.

=== Religion ===
Inverclyde is one of only two Scottish council areas where 'no religion' was not the most common response to the question on religious adherence in the latest 2022 census. Census figures show that the most common religious denomination in Inverclyde was Roman Catholic, with 30,156 adherents (2011 Census) and 26,224 in the most recent 2022 census. Those who described their denomination as Church of Scotland fell to 18,554 in the same period.

=== Languages ===
The 2022 Scottish Census reported that out of 76,542 residents aged three and over, 22,878 (29.9%) considered themselves able to speak or read the Scots language.

The 2022 Scottish Census reported that out of 76,554 residents aged three and over, 660 (0.9%) considered themselves able to speak or read Gaelic.

== Accidents and disasters ==
In the Late Middle Ages and the Early modern period, battles took place with an unknown number of casualties. Ardgowan Castle, originally called Inverkip Castle, was besieged in 1302 and in 1306. In 1578, Duchal Castle near Kilmacolm was attacked and burnt as part of a family feud by James Cunningham. In 1662, Marie Lamont from Inverkip was executed for witchcraft.

The 19th century includes incidents related with water ways, the Radical War, mining and maritime activities. In 1804, two people died in a mining accident at a coal-pit near Greenock. In 1822, the Mary of Iona, a boat sailing islanders from Mull and Iona to Greenock for harvesting work, was struck by a steam tug, Hercules, and sunk close to Cloch Lighthouse with the loss of 42 lives. In 1835, the Whinhill Reservoir collapsed resulting in water sweeping through the streets of Cartsdyke in Greenock, killing about 40 people, most of whom were children asleep in their beds. During the Radical War in 1820, strikes and unrest occurred in multiple towns in Scotland; in Greenock eight people were killed. Maritime accidents include the sinking of the paddle steamer Comet II in 1825 after the ship collided with another paddle steamer Ayr off Kempock Point, Gourock, with the loss of about 65 passengers and crew.

The 20th century includes disasters related with conflagration, World War II, as well as rail and maritime incidents. In 1903, the Ardgowan distillery near Inverkip caught fire; the fire ran down Baker Street causing an explosion and resulting in the killing of 7 people. During World War II, a number of maritime accidents and air strikes took place. In 1940, the French destroyer Maillé Brézé had a torpedo tube malfunction which killed of 37 crew followed by sinking off Greenock at the Tail of the Bank. The Free French Memorial erected on Lyle Hill is partly associated with the loss. In 1941, the Greenock Blitz occurred when the Luftwaffe bombed Greenock resulting in the killing of 271 people. In 1943, the aircraft carrier HMS Dasher (D37) sank in the Firth of Clyde due to an internal explosion 32 km southwest of Wemyss Bay. 379 out of 528 crewmen died.

Post World War II in 1947, the pleasure boat Ocean sank with the loss of 20 people half a mile south of Rosneath Point. In 1956, the cargo ship MV Akka shipwrecked off Dunoon with the loss of six crew. A rail accident occurred in 1965 in upper Port Glasgow, where three boys were killed by a train while on the tracks. Five people in Inverclyde were killed in the 1968 Scotland storm. In 1971, a CO_{2} asphyxiation accident occurred when the oil tanker "Ocean Bridge" was repaired in Greenock Dry Dock which resulted in the death of two men. In 1974, the cargo ship MV Captayannis wrecked with no loss of lives in the Firth of Clyde between Greenock and Helensburgh. The partly submerged 121 m long ship has not been removed and is known locally as the "Sugar Boat".

Accidents in recent times include the Greenock rail crash in 1994, when an Inverclyde Line train derailed after hitting concrete blocks placed deliberately on the railway, resulting in the death of two people. In 2000, Margaret Fleming, a women with learning disabilities, went missing in Inverkip. Her caregivers were convicted of murder in 2019. A maritime accident took place in 2023 when the tugboat Biter capsized off Greenock with the loss of its two crew.

== See also ==
- List of places in Inverclyde
