= June Tripp =

British actress (1901–1985)

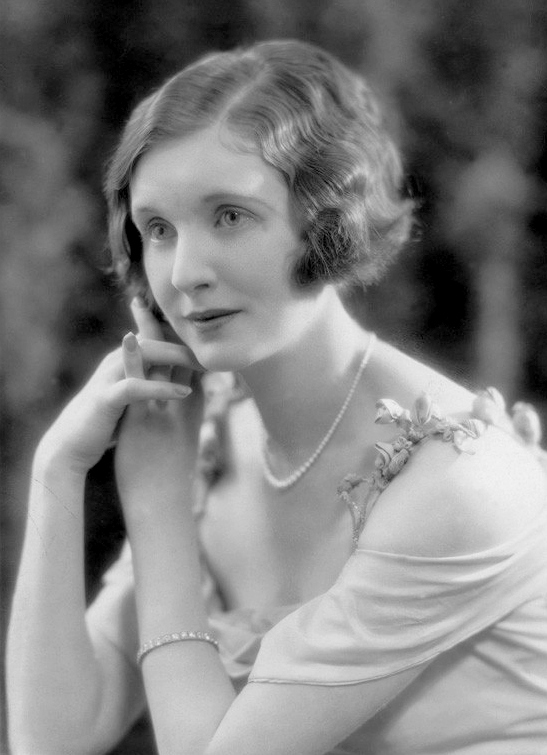
- June Tripp in 1923
- Born: June Howard-Tripp; 11 June 1901; Blackpool, England
- Died: 14 January 1985 (aged 83); New York City, US
- Occupation: Actress
- Years active: 1920–1952
- Spouse(s): John Alan Burns, 4th Baron Inverclyde (1929–1933) (div.); Edward Hillman (1937-1966, his death)

June Tripp (born June Howard-Tripp; 11 June 1901 – 14 January 1985), sometimes known just by her screen name, June, was a British-American actress.

== Biography ==
Born June Howard-Tripp in Blackpool. Thoughshe worked mainly on stage (in revue) and made a handful of films, mostly in the silent era, she began as a dance student,one of a handful taken on by Anna Pavlova at her London home, Ivy House, in 1912 and 1913. She was considered good enough to be sent for further training to Paris but never took up ballet as a career. As a film actress, her most notable screen role was in the silent Alfred Hitchcock thriller The Lodger: A Story of the London Fog (1927), opposite Ivor Novello.

In March 1929, June Tripp married John Alan Burns, 4th Baron Inverclyde and went to live at Castle Wemyss. She appears as "Topsy" in Inverclyde's account of his travels in his steam yacht Beryl around the Mediterranean in the summer of 1929. However, by September 1930, Tripp was in Hollywood having taken up what would prove to be longterm American residency.

In November 1930, Tripp sued for annulment of her marriage, alleging she and Inverclyde had "never lived together as man and wife". Tripp ultimately received a divorce in Reno in August 1931 (but was still considered married in her native land until Inverclyde was granted a divorce in December 1933). Tripp returned to the British stage in the summer of 1932 performing in the musical Fanfare.

In August 1937 Tripp married Edward Hillman Jr, a Chicago department store heir who she had met in California some years prior: the couple wed in Cannes after chancing to meet again in Paris. Although interlocutory divorces for the couple were granted in December 1939 and March 1947 they both times reunited to remain married until Hillman's death at age 65 in 1966, the Hillmans long having split their time between residences in Beverly Hills and Santa Barbara. Tripp had become an American citizen in 1951.

Likely the least known expat "film star" to appear pro bono in the Hollywood paean to British resilience Forever and a Day (released in 1943 - most of the film including Tripp's scenes date from 1941), Tripp made occasional appearances in community theatre productions and had uncredited bit parts in the films A Song for Miss Julie (1945) and Les Misérables (1952) (as the Mother Superior): she also narrated the Jean Renoir film The River (1951).

Tripp published a memoir entitled The Glass Ladder in 1960, in which she recounts with some vividness her Rebecca-esque life at Castle Wemyss with Inverclyde and his rather forbidding housekeeper, whom she compares to Judith Anderson's portrayal in the Hitchcock film, though both novel and film were released some years after her divorce.

She died in New York City in 1985.

== Filmography ==
| Year | Title | Role | Notes |
|---|---|---|---|
| 1920 | The Yellow Claw | Mrs. Vernon | |
| 1926 | Riding for a King | Lady Betty | Short |
| 1927 | The Lodger: A Story of the London Fog | Daisy - A Mannequin | |
| 1943 | Forever and a Day | V.A.D. Girl | |
| 1945 | A Song for Miss Julie | | (uncredited) |
| 1951 | The River | Narrator | |
| 1952 | Les Misèrables | Mother Superior | (Final film role) |

== Autobiography ==
- The Glass Ladder (London: Heinemann, 1960)
