= List of places in Inverclyde =

This is a list of towns and villages in the Inverclyde council area of Scotland.

- Bogston
- Clune Park Estate
- Gourock
- Greenock
- Inverkip
- Kilmacolm
- Kip
- Port Glasgow
- Quarrier's Village
- Wemyss Bay
- Woodhall

== See also ==
- List of places in Scotland
