= George Burns, 2nd Baron Inverclyde =

George Arbuthnot Burns Second Baron Inverclyde of Castle Wemyss
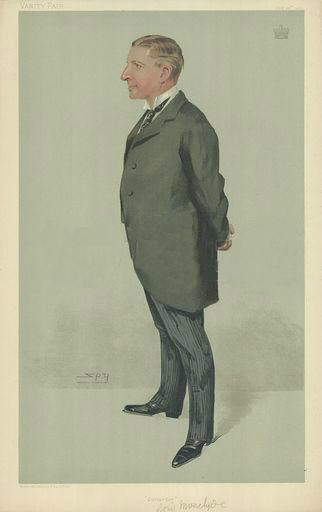
- Vanity Fair caricature by Spy (Leslie Ward), 28 July 1904.
- Born: 17 September 1861; Glasgow, Scotland
- Died: 8 October 1905 (aged 44); Castle Wemyss, Scotland
- Spouse: Mary Fergusson (Married 6 April 1886)

George Arbuthnot Burns, 2nd Baron Inverclyde (17 September 1861 – 8 October 1905) was the chairman of the board of the Cunard Line. Burns was the elder son of John Burns, First Baron Inverclyde (24 June 1829 – 12 February 1901).

Burns's fleet of ships amounted to over 100 vessels, trading between the Clyde, Ireland, Liverpool, and the Scottish Highlands. His father eventually handed him control of the Cunard Steamship Company, making him chairman.

He was justice of the peace for Lanarkshire and Renfrewshire, and was appointed a deputy lieutenant for Glasgow on 1 July 1902. He was also Lord Dean of Guild of the City of Glasgow, 1903–4.

On 6 April 1886, he married Mary Fergusson, younger daughter of Hickson Fergusson, of The Knowe, Ayrshire. However, he died of pneumonia and complications of surgery at the age of 44. He had no children, and the titles and business passed to his younger brother, James Cleland Burns, 3rd Baron Inverclyde (1864–1919).

He spearheaded the development of the steamships Lusitania and RMS Mauretania but died before the ships were launched. His widow, Lady Mary, christened the Lusitania at her launching in June 1906.

Peerage of the United Kingdom
Preceded by John Burns	Baron Inverclyde; 1901 – 1905	Succeeded by James Burns
