= Sir George Burns, 1st Baronet =

Scottish shipping magnate (1795-1890)

Sir George Burns
- Sir George Burns
- Born: December 1795
- Died: June 1890 (aged 94)
- Occupation: Minister

Sir George Burns, 1st Baronet (10 December 1795 – 2 June 1890) was a Scottish shipping magnate.

Burns was born in Glasgow, the son of Rev John Burns (1744–1839), a Presbyterian minister. George was the younger brother of James Burns (1789-1871), with whom he formed a partnership, J. & G. Burns. Together, they started sailing ships between Glasgow and Liverpool, as well as across the Atlantic to Canada and the United States. J. & G. Burns set up the regular steamer service to the Inner and Outer Hebrides. This was sold to David Hutcheson & Co in 1851, and by the mid-1870s, it formed the basis of David MacBrayne Ltd, which today operates as Caledonian MacBrayne across the west coast of Scotland.

Burns was party to the consolidation of a number of companies, including the British and North American Royal Mail Steam Packet Company, into the Cunard Line, which had been begun by Sir Samuel Cunard. The Cunard Line merged with the White Star Line in 1934, and was to launch liners such as the RMS Queen Mary (1936). Today it is a US-owned cruise company, which operated the famous Queen Elizabeth 2 (QE2).

In addition to his shipping interests, Burns was also one of the largest shareholders in The Glasgow and South-Western Railway

Burns retired to Wemyss Bay in what is now Inverclyde (Renfrewshire) . He was made a baronet at age 94 in 1889, the oldest ever recipient of the award. A devout Episcopalian, Edwin Hodder wrote a hagiography of Burns, and J. J. Burnet's Inverclyde Church was instituted in the memory of Burns and his wife. John Burns (1829–1901), his eldest son, succeeded him in the baronetcy, became head of the Cunard Company and was created a peer, under the title of Baron Inverclyde, in 1897.

Baronetage of the United Kingdom
New creation	Baronet (of Wemyss Bay); 1889–1890	Succeeded by John Burns
