= Wemyss Bay =

Coordinates: 55.884°N 4.887°W

Wemyss Bay: Scottish Gaelic: Bàgh nan Uaimhean
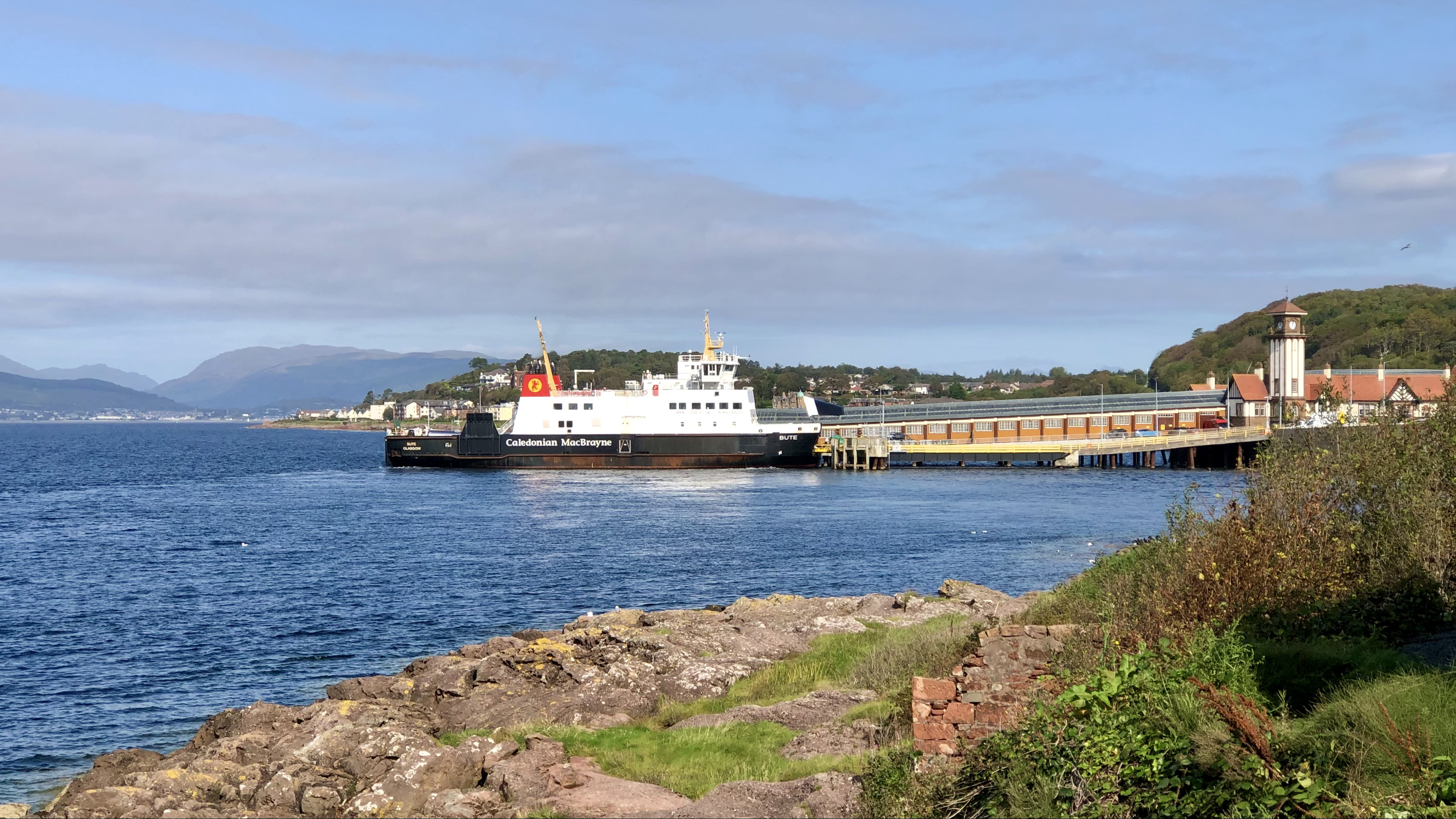
- Pier in front of Wemyss headland and Kelly woods

- Location within Inverclyde
- Population: 2,390 (2020)
- OS grid reference: NS195695
- Council area: Inverclyde
- Lieutenancy area: Renfrewshire
- Country: Scotland
- Sovereign state: United Kingdom
- Post town: WEMYSS BAY
- Postcode district: PA18
- Dialling code: 01475
- Police: Scotland
- Fire: Scottish
- Ambulance: Scottish
- UK Parliament: Inverclyde and Renfrewshire West
- Scottish Parliament: Greenock and Inverclyde

Wemyss Bay (/ˌwiːmz ˈbeɪ/) is a village on the coast of the Firth of Clyde in Inverclyde in the west central Lowlands of Scotland. It is in the traditional county of Renfrewshire. It is adjacent to Skelmorlie, North Ayrshire. The town and villages have always been in separate counties, divided by the Kelly Burn.

Wemyss Bay is the port for ferries on the Sea Road to Rothesay on the Isle of Bute. Passengers from the island can connect to Glasgow via Glasgow Central railway station by trains, which terminate in the town at Wemyss Bay railway station, noted for its architectural qualities and regarded as one of Scotland's finest railway buildings. The port is very exposed, so in high winds the ferries must travel up river to Gourock to dock.

== Topography ==
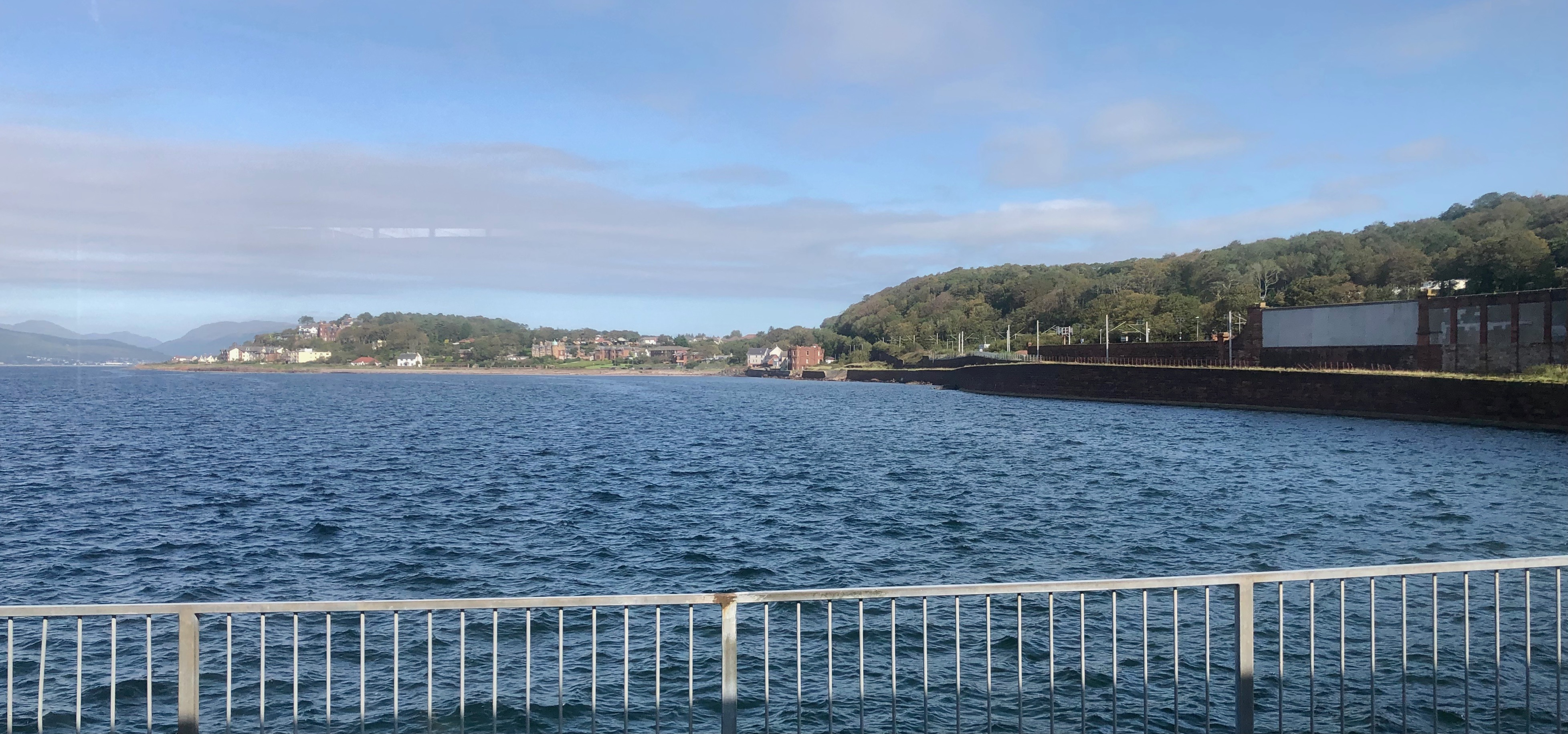
Wemyss Estate, and Kelly hills fronted by Dunavertie and railway station, from pier.

The coast at this place, as it is with a few exceptions along the whole course of the Frith, is bounded at a short distance back from the shore with a range of hills, sometimes rising in gentle slopes, and at other times in abrupt rocky precipices, from which is to be had a continued succession of beautiful and varied views.

— John M. Leighton, Select Views on the River Clyde (1830)

== Etymology ==
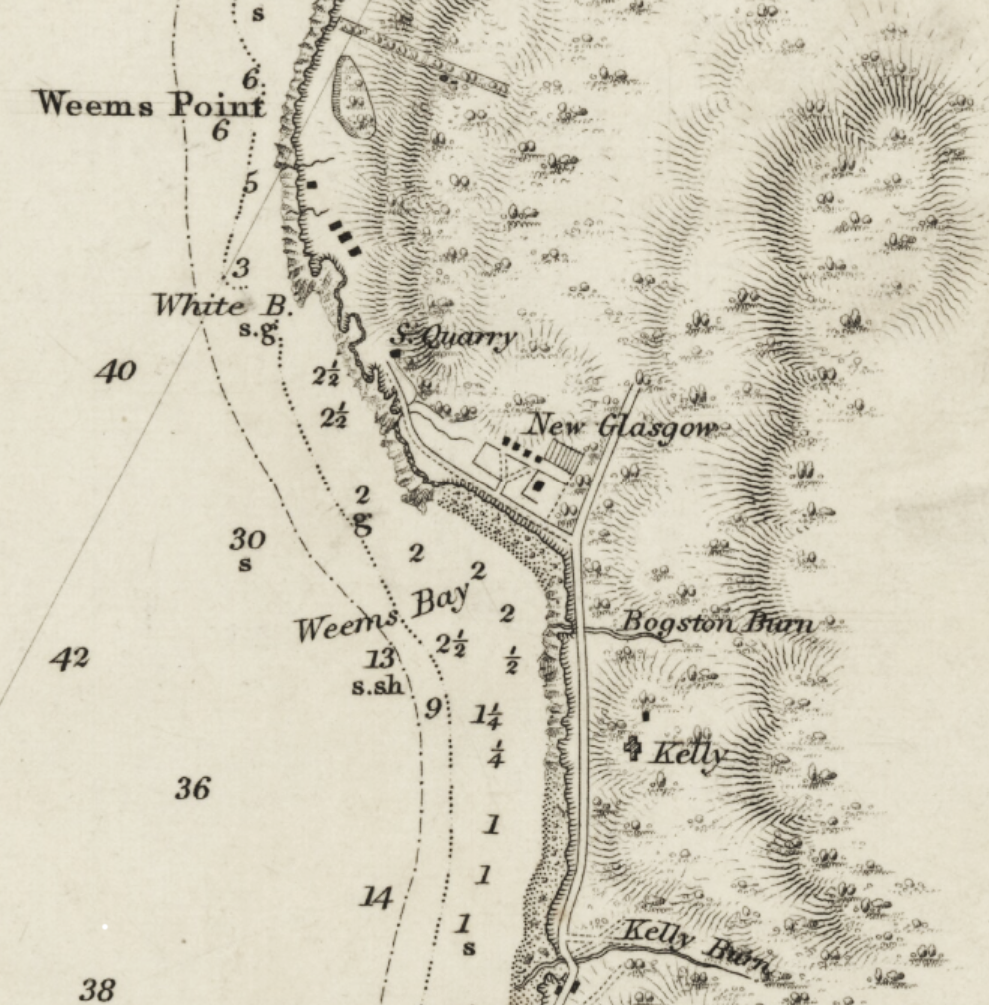
Admiralty Chart of 1846 / 1852, showing "New Glasgow" with four villas at "Weems Bay".

The name Kelly comes from Celtic languages, with the meaning of a wood or woodland. Similarly, Kelburn refers to a wooded river.

The name Wemyss is derived from the Scottish Gaelic uaimh which means cave. It is believed to be taken from the caves of the Firth of Forth where the Clan Wemyss made their home. The chiefs are one of the few noble families who are descended from the Celtic nobility through the Clan MacDuff Earls of Fife.

Unlike the Firth of Forth, no conspicuous caves were seen in the Wemyss Bay area, though some minor caves may have been found in the cliffs. In his guide, Boyd says he was told the story that an old fisherman named Robert Wemyss lived at the bay in the 18th century, and rented out boats. Three of his regular customers were unable to agree on the name for the bay, until they decided to "call it after old Bob".

== History ==
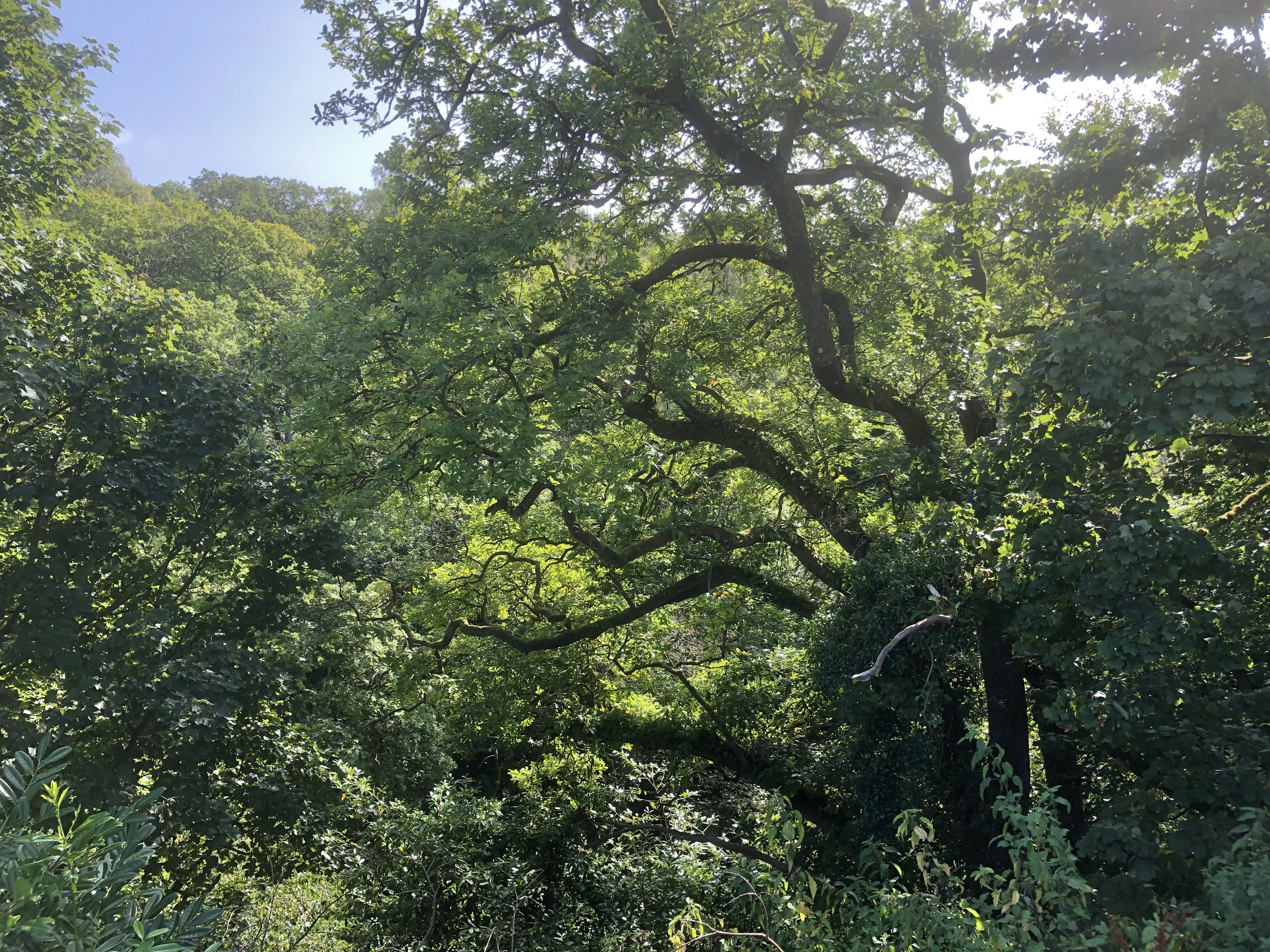
Kelly Glen, from the site of Kelly Castle

=== Lands of Kelly and Ardgowan ===
The Kelly Burn flows west down the hillside in a ravine and into the bay, which at one time was called Kelly Bay or White Week. The lands of Kelly, to the north of the burn, were granted in the late 15th century by King James III of Scotland to the Bannatyne family, descendants of the Bannatynes of Kames on Bute. Their Kelly Castle stood on a cliff edge on the north side of the ravine, about 500m upstream from the sea, and was the setting for the song "The Carle of Kellyburn Braes" collected by Robert Burns. The castle burnt down in 1740, and was not rebuilt.

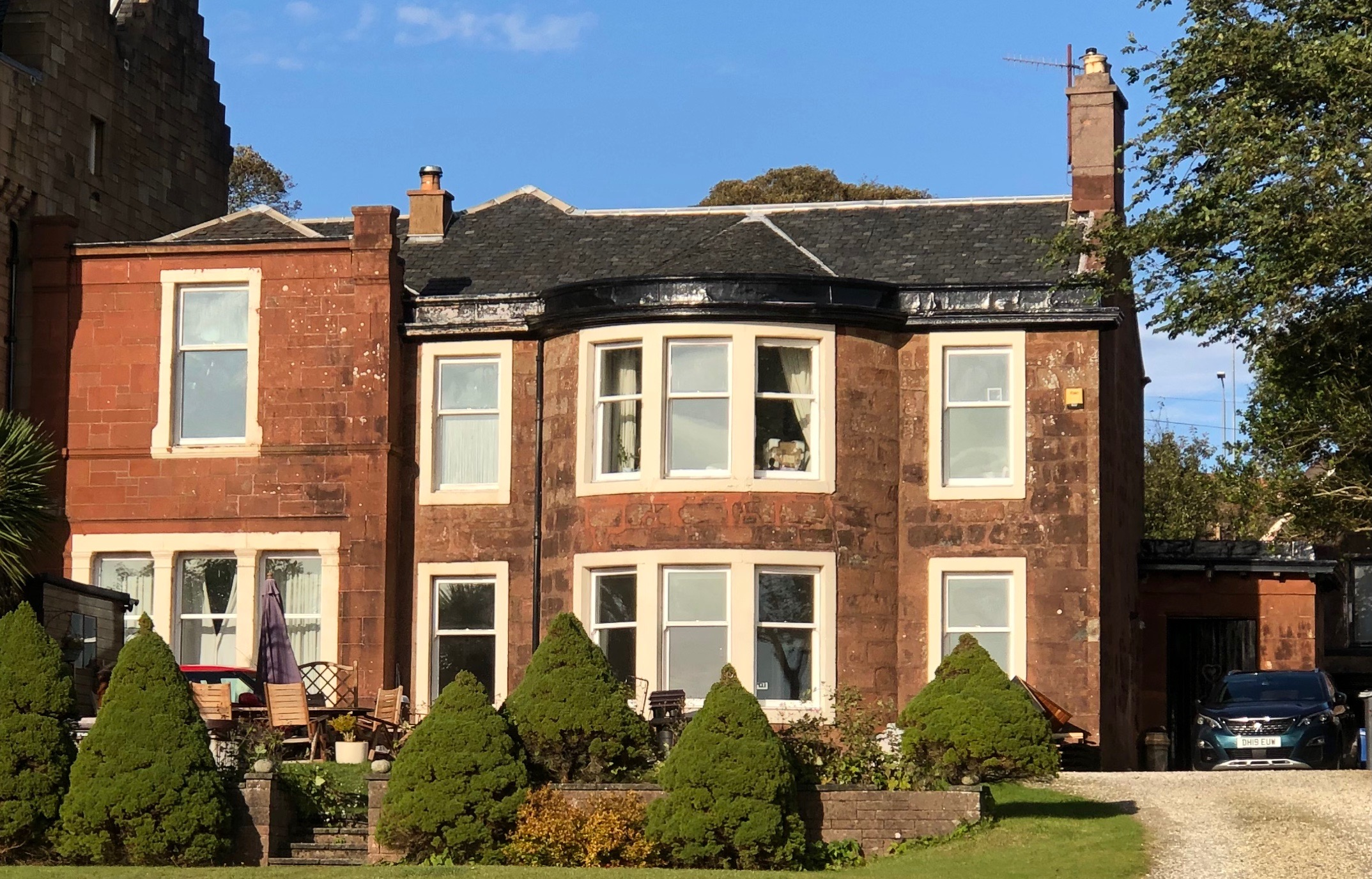
Mansfield House, 18th century villa still recognisable despite extensions.

The land on the north side of the bay to the west of what became the turnpike road, identified as Lower Finnock, was part of the adjoining Shaw Stewart Ardgowan Estate. This densely wooded area had valuable salmon fishing rights, the only dwelling was "Wemyss Cottage" occupied by a fisherman. In the late 18th century, ihe Ardgowan Estate feued an area for houses to Mr. Orkney of Rothesay, who built four identical villas facing the bay, off an access road (Wemyss Bay Road) extending west from the main road; they are shown in John Ainslie's 1796 survey which also records the names Wemyss Bay and Wemyss Point. These villas, the only houses in the bay for many years, were let to Glasgow merchants and came to be known as New Glasgow.

=== Wallace's "marine village" ===
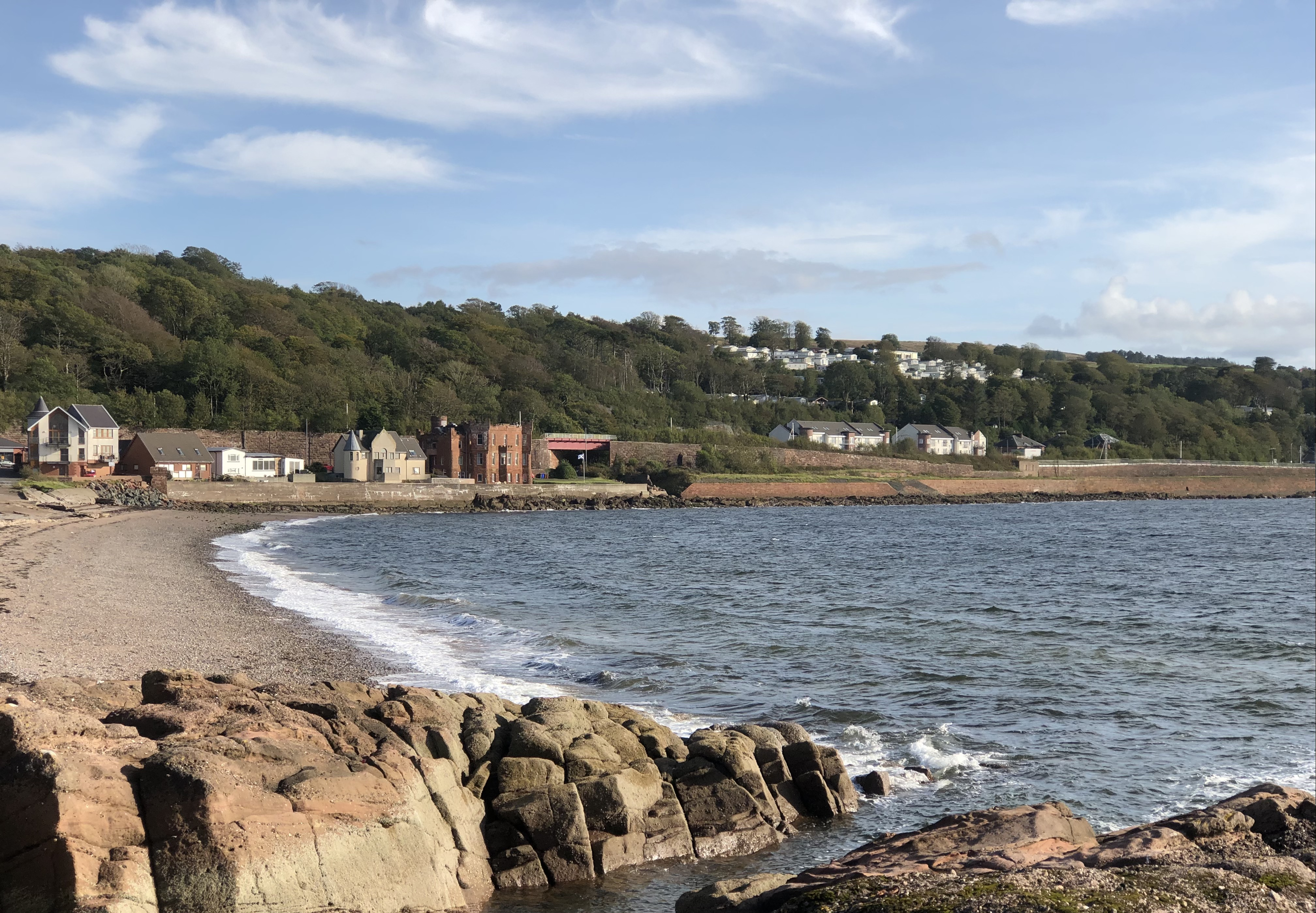
Wemyss Bay beach from rocks, railway in front of Kelly estate. Kelly House (once prominent in this view) was located where modern "lodges" look out above houses on Shore Road.

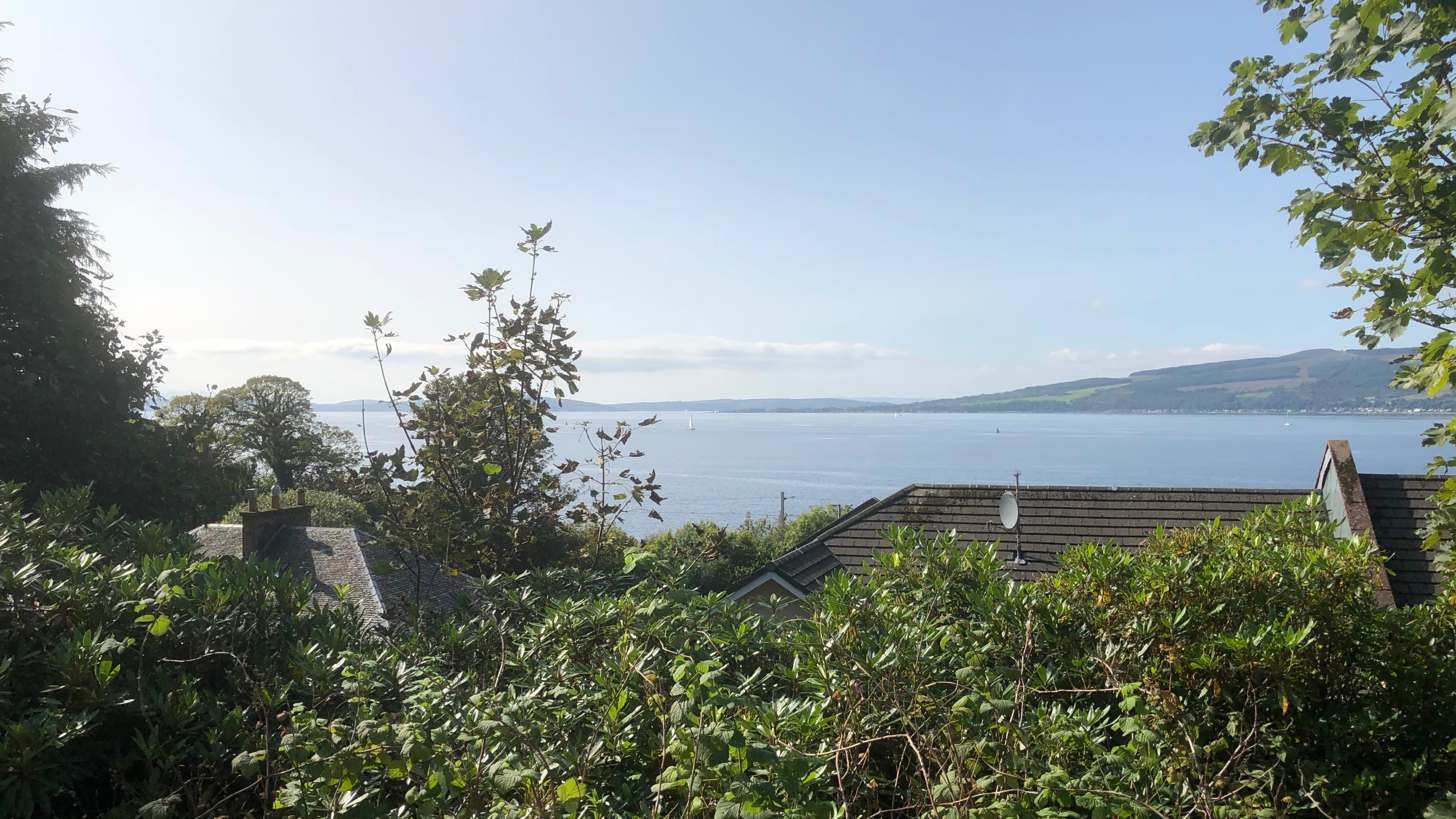
Outlook from Kelly House site

In 1792 the Glasgow merchant John Wallace, owner of extensive estates in Jamaica with sugar plantations and slaves, bought the Kelly Estate. In 1793 he had a red sandstone mansion called Kelly House built on the hillside up from the road, looking over the bay (this was later painted white). About this time the Wemyss Bay Hotel was built on the east side of the main road, near the junction to the road serving the villas; a building is shown there on Ainslie's map.

In 1803 his son Robert Wallace of Kelly inherited the Kelly Estate, and began major improvements, including a large picture-gallery extension to Kelly House. In 1814 he exchanged his land at North Finnock with Shaw Stewart of Ardgowan to gain the Lower Finnock area adjoining Wemyss Bay, so that his estate boundary on both sides of the road was on a line immediately north of what became Ardgowan Road. He also bought land which he exchanged with the Earl of Eglinton to extend the Kelly Estate across the Kelly Burn into Ayrshire, incorporating the Auchindarroch area of upper Skelmorlie. In 1832 Wallace became Greenock's first MP, and he played a significant part in introduction of the Uniform Penny Post. He had a row of houses built on the west side of the turnpike road between Inverkip and Wemyss Bay, and named the development Forbes Place after his wife's maiden name, Forbes, of Craigievar.

Wallace planned the expansion of Wemyss Bay into a "Marine Village" of 200 villas, with facilities including three churches, hotel, Academy, hot baths, reading room and billiards room, terraced walks featuring a fountain and grass promenade, bowling green, curling pond, and quoiting ground. His plans included a harbour and a steamboat quay. In 1846 the Jamaican estates Wallace had inherited were devalued, and he lost his wealth. He resigned as MP, and sold the Kelly Estate to an Australian merchant named James Alexander.

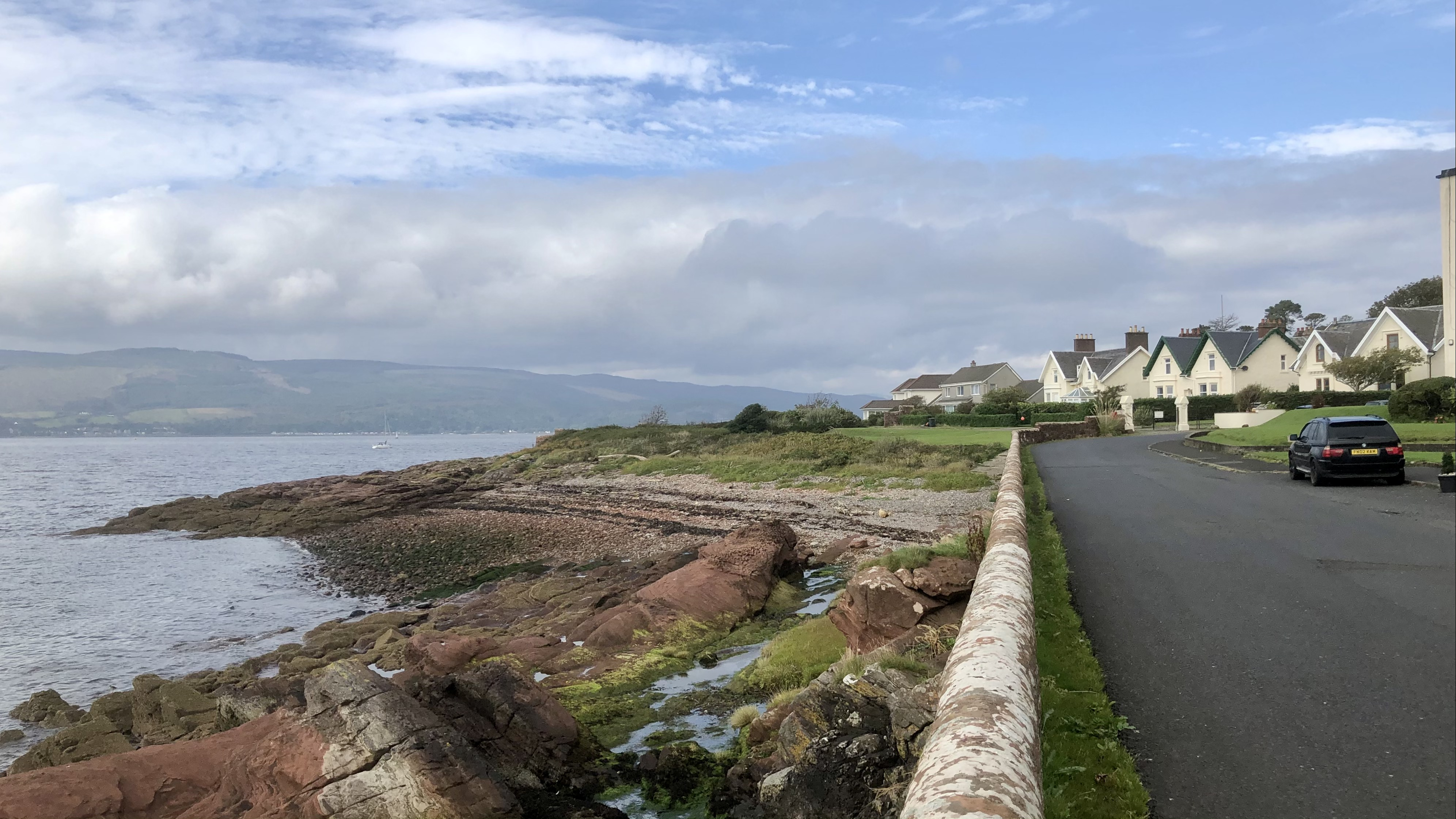
Whiting Bay, with three large "cottages" as indicated on the 1846 chart.

An 1847 guide book described how "in passing Wemyss Point, we come upon Wemyss Bay or New Glasgow, which from its sheltered situation, the number of beautiful localities admirably adapted for building sites, and which indeed we understand had been purchased of Mr. Wallace by Mr. Alexander, with the view of building villas thereon, will no doubt become an important rival to its neighbouring watering places. There is already a row of neat villas and cottages stretching from the port, and occasionally an elegant mansion. We are now within sight of Kelly House, the seat of R. Wallace, Esq., M.P.".

Whiting Bay pier was constructed to the west of the original villas. Alexander went bankrupt after only a few years, and in 1850 his creditors sold the estate in two roughly equal portions; Kelly went to James Scott of Glasgow, Wemyss Bay to Charles Wilsone Brown.

=== Wemyss Bay estate and railway ===
Charles Wilsone Brown did a great deal to develop the bay, selling ground for feuing. By 1855 there were 36 villas, and he got Castle Wemyss, designed by Robert William Billings, built on the hillside above Wemyss Point. In 1860 he sold his estate on to George Burns, recently retired as a partner in the Cunard Line. Burns had Wemyss House, designed by James Salmon built (near Undercliff) near the north end of the bay. His son John Burns took over Castle Wemyss and had it dramatically enlarged to a design by Billings.

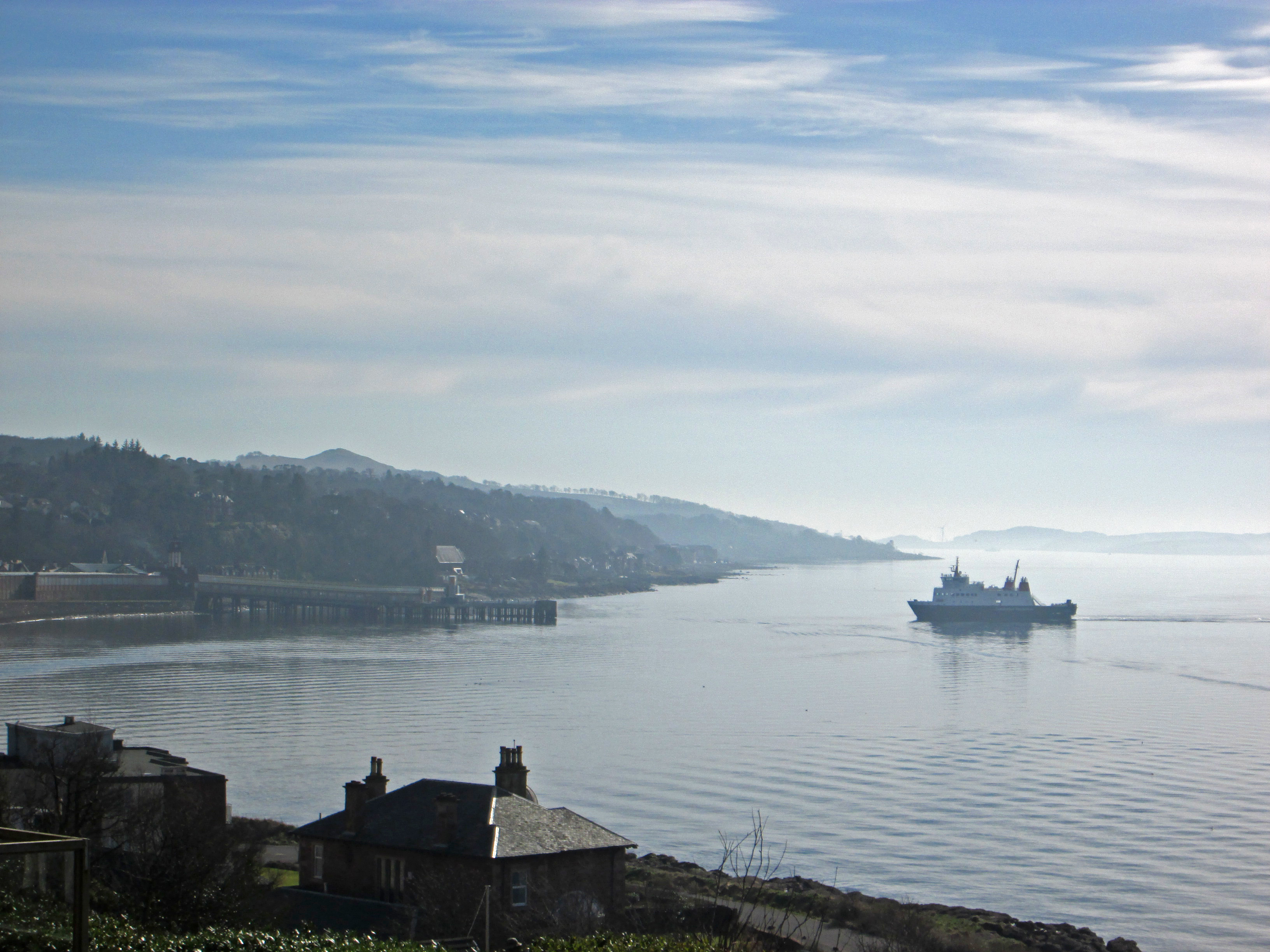
Wemyss Bay, view looking south from Cliff Terrace Road, with MV Bute approaching Wemyss Bay railway station and pier.

In November 1862 work began on the Greenock and Wemyss Bay Railway. The original plan was for a station in the grounds of the "Clutha" villa at the start of Undercliffe Road, with a short walk along to Whiting Bay pier, but objections were raised by the Burns family. James Scott sold ground from the Kelly Estate to the railway, and the line crossed a bridge over the road to extend down the coast over a beach which Wallace's 1845 plan had identified as "Bathing Bay". The railway opened in May 1865 with its stone-built terminus station at a new pier near the Kelly Burn. The Whiting Bay pier had been repaired after damage by a hurricane in February 1856, it was finally wrecked by a storm at the end of 1865.

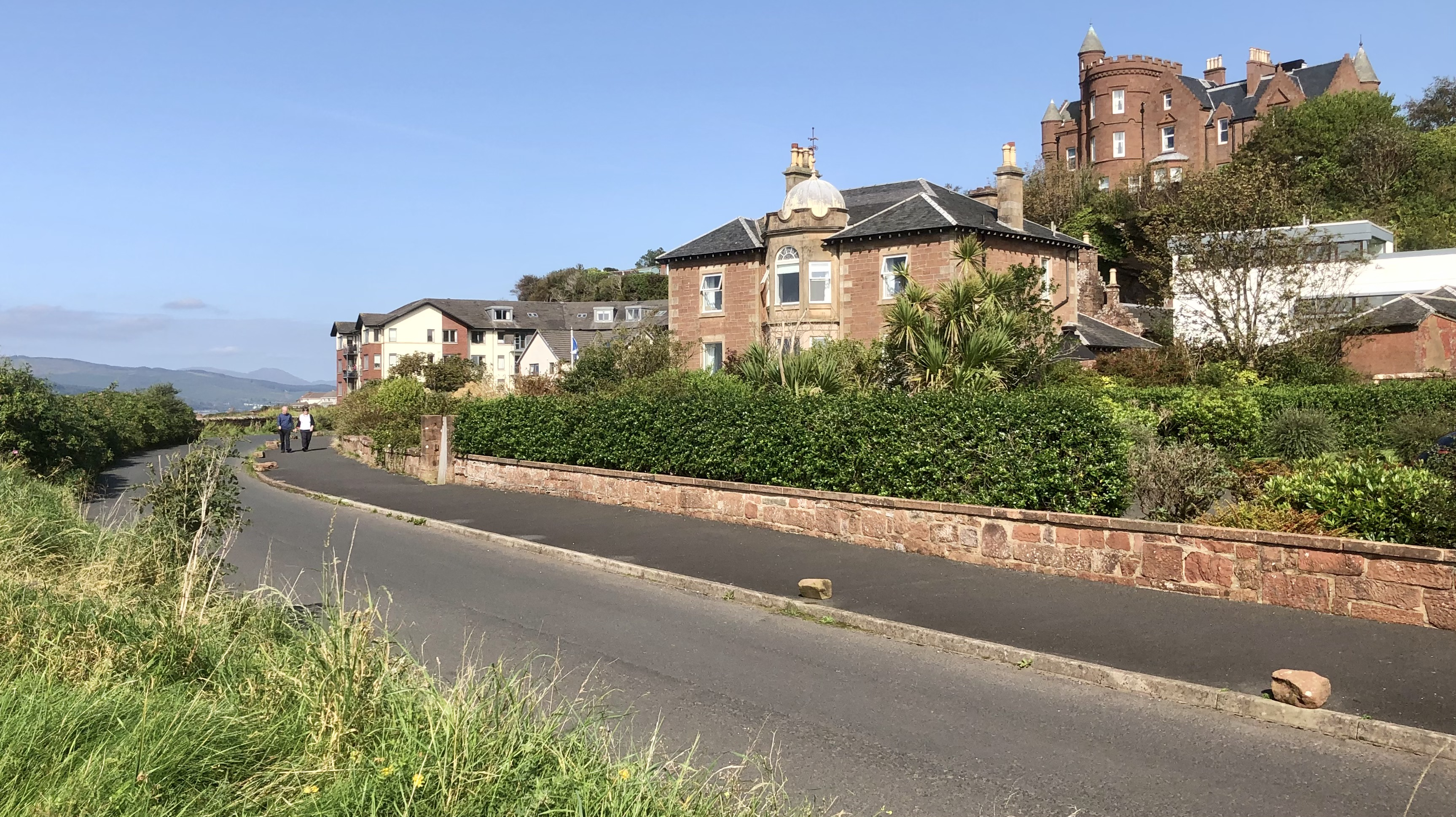
Wemyss Bay Road, Clutha and The Cliff

Further development introduced bigger, more complex, houses. Of the four original villas, two were taken down as the site for a larger house, one replaced by a villa which may have been designed by Billings and was later remodelled by John Honeyman. Only one still shows something of the original design and scale. In 1887 George Burns had the episcopal Inverclyde Church built at Undercliffe Road in memory of his wife. This church was designed by J.J. Burnet.

=== James Young of Kelly ===
In 1867 Scott sold the Kelly estate to James Young, who had become a wealthy industrialist by inventing paraffin, and was known from then as James Young of Kelly. After his wife Mary died in April 1868, he continued living at Kelly House with his family.

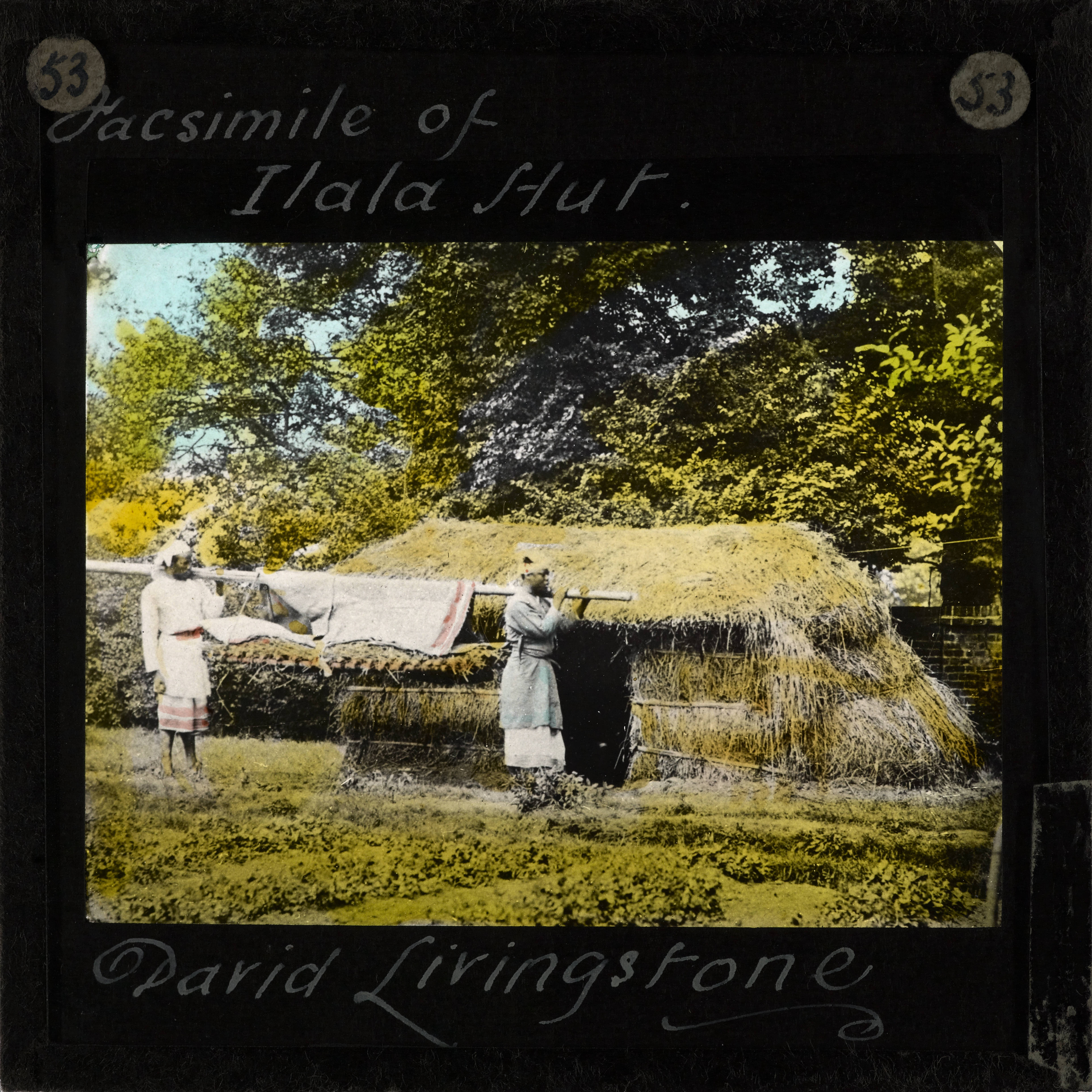
Replica of kitanda and Livingstone's Hut, lantern slide.

Since college in Glasgow in 1836, Young had been a friend and supporter of David Livingstone. After the news of the explorer's death, he arranged for Livingstone's assistants Chuma and Susi to visit Britain in 1874. They arrived after the funeral, and following a period at Newstead Abbey helping Horace Waller with Livingstone's Last Journals, they reached Kelly in June. Young questioned them closely about the hut in which Livingstone had died, and as grass in fields was similar to that in Africa, they made a facsimile of the one they had built at Ilala. A photo of this informed the book illustrator. They also replicated the kitanda they had made to carry Livingstone after he became too weak to walk. On a later visit to Livingstone's relatives at Hamilton they made another hut. Wrench made a colourised photograph postcard of "Livingstone's Hut, Wemyss Bay".

The original Kelly House was replaced by a mansion designed by William Leiper, built further up the hill in 1890. This Kelly House was destroyed in a fire in 1913. Attempts were made to blame suffragettes, but research indicates faulty electrical wiring was a more likely cause. The house remained a burnt out ruin for several years. A caravan park now occupies the estate, with its facilities building on the site of the 1890 mansion.

=== Other notable buildings ===
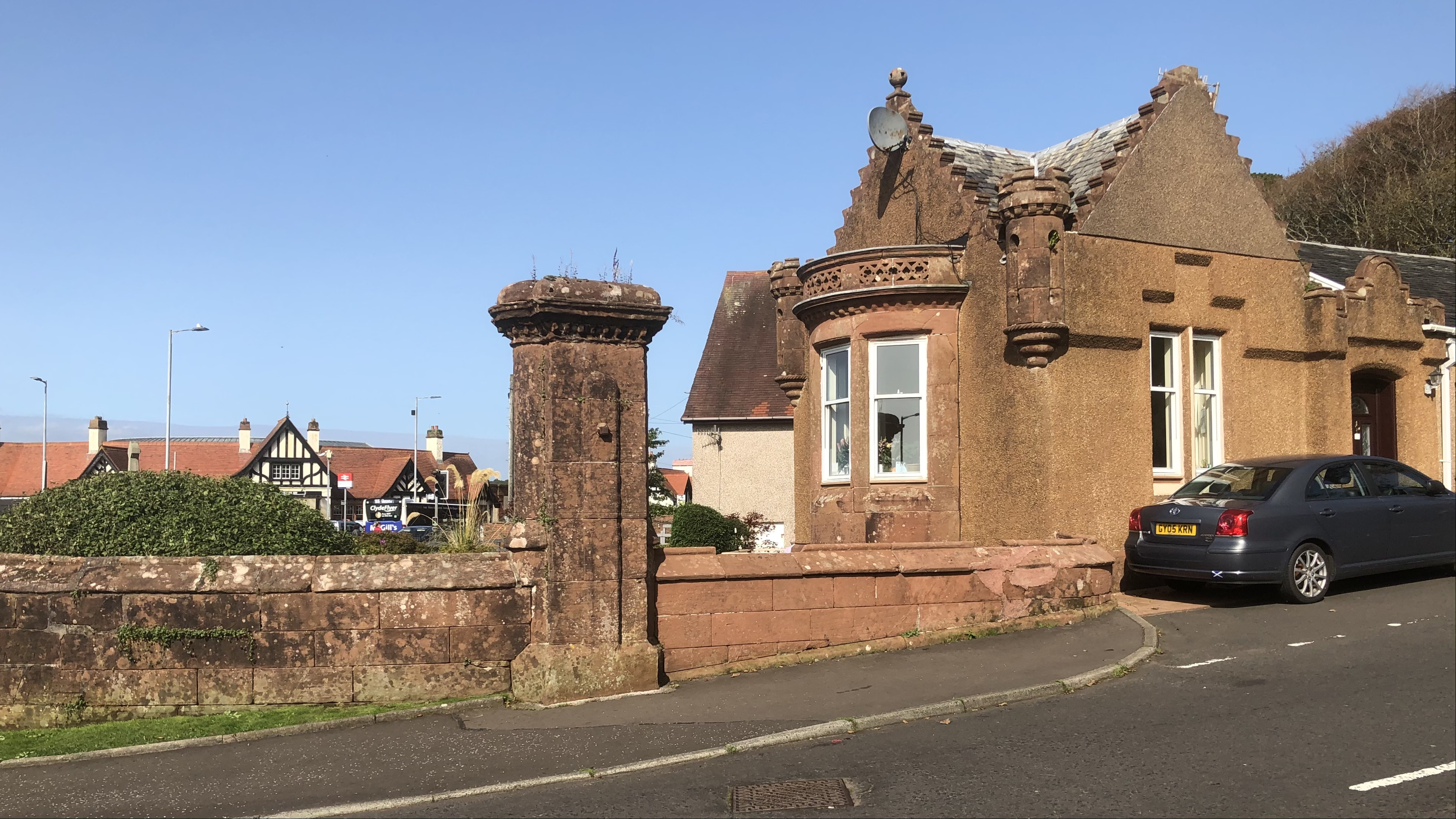
Wemyss Bay railway station, seen from the Kelly Estate entrance gatehouse built in 1890.

A memorial on the shore road recalls 'The Gaiter Club', whose members included Anthony Trollope, Lord Kelvin, Lord Palmerston and the Earl of Shaftesbury.

Neither Castle Wemyss nor James Salmon's Wemyss House remain, having been demolished in the 1980s and 1940s respectively. Also gone is J.J. Burnet's episcopal Inverclyde Church, which stood on the shore road of Undercliff Road and was demolished in 1970.

The Castle Wemyss estate and adjoining areas had been sold off in the 1960s to property developers and since then the village has grown considerably, albeit largely a dormitory settlement for Greenock and Glasgow. However several of the fine red sandstone properties remain and are now seen as renovation opportunities. There is a butcher, newsagent, cafe and fish and chip shop in the village and a pub and cafe in the extensive railway station buildings.
