= List of shipwrecks in October 1825 =

The list of shipwrecks in October 1825 includes some ships sunk, wrecked or otherwise lost during October 1825.

== 1 October ==
List of shipwrecks: 1 October 1825
Ship	State	Description
Ariel	United States	The ship was wrecked on Andes Island. Her crew were rescued. She was on a voyage from "Xabura" to New York.
Hope	United Kingdom	The ship departed from Whitehaven, Cumberland for Dublin. No further trace, presumed foundered with the loss of all hands.
Junius	United States	The ship was wrecked in the Bimini Islands. Her crew were rescued. She was on a voyage from New York to Alvarado, Veracruz, Mexico.
Mary	United Kingdom	The brig was driven ashore at Port Natal, Africa. Her crew were rescued
Providence	United States	The ship was wrecked on the Bahama Banks with the loss of all hands. She was on a voyage from Philadelphia, Pennsylvania to Alvarado.

== 2 October ==
List of shipwrecks: 2 October 1825
Ship	State	Description
Elizabeth	United Kingdom	The ship departed from Mauritius for the Cape of Good Hope. No further trace, presumed foundered with the loss of all hands.
Havre Packet	France	The ship was wrecked at "Point Piedras". Her crew were rescued. She was on a voyage from the Cape Verde Islands to Buenos Aires, Argentina.
Prince Leopold	United Kingdom	The ship was wrecked on the Pipa Rocks, in the River Plate. Her crew survived. She was on a voyage from Liverpool, Lancashire to Montevideo, Uruguay.

== 3 October ==
List of shipwrecks: 3 October 1825
Ship	State	Description
Auckland	United Kingdom	The ship departed from Málaga, Spain for London. No further trace, presumed foundered with the loss of all hands.
Salisbury	United Kingdom	The ship was driven ashore and wrecked on Götaland, Sweden. She was on a voyage from Liverpool, Lancashire to Saint Petersburg, Russia.

== 4 October ==
List of shipwrecks: 4 October 1825
Ship	State	Description
Gower	United Kingdom	The ship was lost near Tarifa, Spain. Her crew were rescued. She was on a voyage from Málaga, Spain to London.
Richmond	United Kingdom	The ship was driven ashore at Iron Otter Point. She was on a voyage from Drogheda, County Louth to Greenock, Renfrewshire.
William Huskisson	United Kingdom	The barque sprang a leak and was abandoned in the Atlantic Ocean. Her sixteen crew were rescued by Rebecca (United Kingdom). William Huskisson was on a voyage from Milford Haven, Pembrokeshire to Quebec City, Lower Canada, British North America.

== 5 October ==
List of shipwrecks: 5 October 1825
Ship	State	Description
Friends	United Kingdom	The ship was in collision with Anglim (United Kingdom) and foundered in the Atlantic Ocean 70 nautical miles (130 km) south east of St. Paul's Island, Nova Scotia, British North America. Her crew were rescued by Anglim and Aurora (United Kingdom). Friends was on a voyage from Quebec City, Lower Canada, British North America to Chepstow, Monmouthshire.
Gower	United Kingdom	The ship was driven ashore and wrecked 2 leagues (6 nautical miles (11 km)) west of Tarifa, Spain. She was on a voyage from Málaga, Spain to London.
Mary	United Kingdom	The ship was severely damaged by fire at St. John's, Newfoundland, British North America.

== 6 October ==
List of shipwrecks: 6 October 1825
Ship	State	Description
Bayonnais	France	The ship was lost with the loss of four of her crew. She was on a voyage from St. Jago de Cuba, Cuba to bordeaux, Gironde.
Friends	United Kingdom	The ship was in collision with Augline (United Kingdom) and was consequently abandoned by her crew.

== 7 October ==
List of shipwrecks: 7 October 1825
Ship	State	Description
Active	United Kingdom	The brig was driven ashore and wrecked at Cardigan with the loss of three of her crew.
Blessing	United Kingdom	The ship was driven ashore and wrecked near Abermawr, Pembrokeshire with the loss of all hands.
Brothers	United Kingdom	The ship was driven ashore and wrecked near Abermawr. Her crew were rescued. She was on a voyage from Memel, Prussia to Haverfordwest, Pembrokeshire.
Cortas	(United Kingdom of Great Britain and Ireland) Bahamas	The ship was wrecked on the Rocky Key, off the coast of Cuba.
Horatio	United Kingdom	The schooner was wrecked near Fishguard, Pembrokeshire. She was on a voyage from Kinsale, County Cork to Newport, Monmouthshire.

== 8 October ==
List of shipwrecks: 8 October 1825
Ship	State	Description
Hopewell	United Kingdom	The brig was driven ashore and damaged at Ballyvaston, County Antrim. Her crew were rescued. She was on a voyage from Greenock, Renfrewshire to Limerick. Hopewell was refloated in early November and taken in to Killough, County Antrim.
Mayflower	United Kingdom	The ship was driven ashore and wrecked in Seaford Bay.
Nicolas	United Kingdom	The sloop foundered in the Irish Sea. Her crew were rescued. She was on a voyage from Maryport, Cumberland to Dumfries.
Petit Charles	France	The hermaphrodite brig was wrecked at Bahía Honda, Spain. All on board were rescued.

== 9 October ==
List of shipwrecks: 9 October 1825
Ship	State	Description
Bee	United Kingdom	The ship was wrecked near Tregwynt, Pembrokeshire with the loss of all hands.

== 10 October ==
List of shipwrecks: 10 October 1825
Ship	State	Description
Ann	United Kingdom	The ship was driven ashore at Anjur, India.
Daw	United Kingdom	The ship was driven ashore on Tiree, Outer Hebrides. Her crew were rescued. She was on a voyage from Wick, Caithness to Dublin.
Governor Strong	United Kingdom	The ship was driven ashore at Gibraltar.
Three Brothers	United Kingdom	The ship foundered in the Mediterranean Sea (37°48′N 25°00′E). Lusitania (United Kingdom) rescued the six crewmen.

== 11 October ==
List of shipwrecks: 11 October 1825
Ship	State	Description
Briton	United Kingdom	The ship was driven ashore and wrecked at Danzig. She was on a voyage from Guernsey, Channel Islands to Danzig.
Nostra Señora del Coro	Spain	The ship was driven ashore by a Colombian privateer and was wrecked near Málaga. She was on a voyage from Alicante to Gijón.
St. Nicholas	United Kingdom	The ship was driven ashore at Christiansand, Norway and capsized. She was on a voyage from Arkhangelsk, Russia to Great Yarmouth, Norfolk.

== 12 October ==
List of shipwrecks: 12 October 1825
Ship	State	Description
Aspasia	United Kingdom	The ship was wrecked near Wick, Caithness.
John & Robert	United Kingdom	The ship was driven ashore at New York, United States. She was on a voyage from Bristol, Gloucestershire to New York.
Majestic	United Kingdom	The ship was driven ashore near "Hogeness".

== 14 October ==
List of shipwrecks: 14 October 1825
Ship	State	Description
Thames	United Kingdom	The ship ran aground and capsized in the Saint Lawrence River. She had been refloated by 17 October and taken in to Quebec City, Lower Canada, British North America for repairs.
Ulysses	United Kingdom	The ship was wrecked on the Bondicar Rocks, in the North Sea off the coast of Northumberland. She was on a voyage from Sunderland, County Durham to Aberdeen.

== 15 October ==
List of shipwrecks: 15 October 1825
Ship	State	Description
Especulador do Brazil	Brazil	The ship was wrecked on the Covea Grand Bank, in the Atlantic Ocean off the coast of Brazil. She was on a voyage from Rio de Janeiro to Pernambuco and Maranhão.
John	United Kingdom	The ship was wrecked on the Haisborough Sands, in the North Sea off the coast of Norfolk. She was on a voyage from London to Newcastle upon Tyne, Northumberland.
Laura Ann	United Kingdom	The ship sprang a leak in the Atlantic Ocean and was abandoned. She was on a voyage from Virginia, United States to Liverpool, Lancashire.
Twelve Brothers	United Kingdom	The ship departed from Great Yarmouth, Norfolk for a Scottish port. No further trace, presumed foundered with the loss of all hands.
Venus	United Kingdom	The ship departed from Swansea, Glamorgan for Youghall, County Cork. No further trace, presumed foundered with the loss of all hands.
William and Amelia	United Kingdom	The ship foundered in the Atlantic Ocean with the loss of seven of her twelve crew.

== 16 October ==
List of shipwrecks: 16 October 1825
Ship	State	Description
Anne	United Kingdom	The ship was wrecked near Blacksod, County Mayo. Her crew were rescued. She was on a voyage from Arkhangelsk, Russian Empire to Limerick.
Caraibe	France	The ship was driven ashore near Pauillac, Gironde. She was on a voyage from Martinique to Bordeaux, Gironde Caraibe was later refloated.

== 17 October ==
List of shipwrecks: 17 October 1825
Ship	State	Description
Ebenezer	United Kingdom	The ship was driven ashore at Wells-next-the-Sea, Norfolk. She was later declared a total loss. Ebenezer was on a voyage from London to Spalding, Lincolnshire.
John	United Kingdom	The ship was wrecked on the Haisborough Sands, in the North Sea off the coast of Norfolk with the loss of two of the eleven people on board. She was on a voyage from London to Newcastle upon Tyne, Northumberland.

== 18 October ==
List of shipwrecks: 18 October 1825
Ship	State	Description
Columbus	United Kingdom	The ship foundered off the coast of County Cork.
Comet	United Kingdom	The paddle steamer collided with Ayr (United Kingdom) in the Clyde and sank with the loss of 62 lives. There were ten survivors. Comet was on a voyage from Inverness to Gourock, Renfrewshire via the Caledonian Canal. The wreck was raised on 21 July 1826 and was subsequently scrapped.
Ebenezer	United Kingdom	The ship was driven ashore at Wells-next-the-Sea, Norfolk. She was on a voyage from London to Spalding, Lincolnshire.
Good Intent	United Kingdom	The ship was driven ashore and wrecked on Jersey, Channel Islands. Her crew were rescued. She was on a voyage from Bristol, Gloucestershire to Guernsey and Jersey.
Hamlet	United Kingdom	The ship was wrecked on the west point of Prince Edward Island, British North America. She was on a voyage from Miramichi, New Brunswick, British North America to the Clyde.
Henry	United Kingdom	The ship was lost at Richibucto, New Brunswick, British North America.
Jessie	United Kingdom	The ship was lost on the North Bank, in Liverpool Bay.
Jop	United Kingdom	The ship was lost at Mauritius. Her crew were rescued. She was on a voyage from Bengal, India to Mauritius.
Jupiter	Rostock	The ship sprang a leak and foundered in the North Sea. Her seven crew were rescued by Thetis (Sweden). She was on a voyage from Rostock to Bordeaux, Gironde, France.
Lord Cathcart	United Kingdom	The ship was wrecked on the west point of Prince Edward Island. She was on a voyage from Miramichi to the Clyde.
Protector	United Kingdom	The ship was wrecked on the west point of Prince Edward Island. She was on a voyage from the Clyde to Miramichi.
Rio	United Kingdom	The ship was lost off Alvarado, Veracruz, Mexico.
Ruby	United Kingdom	The brig was driven ashore at South Shields, County Durham. Her crew were rescued. She was on a voyage from Aberdeen to Sunderland, County Durham. She was refloated on 29 October and taken in to South Shields.

== 19 October ==
List of shipwrecks: 19 October 1825
Ship	State	Description
City of Glasgow	United Kingdom	The paddle steamer was driven ashore and severely damaged at Douglas, Isle of Man. All 21 people on board were rescued by Dart, Nestor and True Blue (all (United Kingdom of Great Britain and Ireland) Isle of Man). She was on a voyage from Douglas to Liverpool, Lancashire. City of Glasgow was refloated on 25 October and taken in to Douglas. She was later repaired and returned to service.
Courier	France	The ship was driven ashore in the Garonne.
Hamlet	United Kingdom	The ship was wrecked on West Cape, Prince Edward Island, British North America.
Lord Cathcart	United Kingdom	The ship was wrecked on West Cape, Prince Edward Island.
Mary	United Kingdom	The ship was driven ashore and wrecked at Holyhead, Anglesey. She was on a voyage from Liverpool to Bristol, Gloucestershire.
Protector	United Kingdom	The ship was wrecked on West Cape, Prince Edward Island.
Ruby	United Kingdom	The brig was driven ashore and wrecked at Souter Point, County Durham. Her crew were rescued. She was on a voyage from Aberdeen to Sunderland, County Durham.
Sally Ann	United States	The schooner was abandoned in the Atlantic Ocean. Her crew were rescued by Henry Clay (United Kingdom). She was on a voyage from Virginia to North Carolina.
Sikhalina	Prussia	The ship was wrecked at Rødby, Denmark. Her crew were rescued. She was on a voyage from Hamburg to Königsberg.

== 20 October ==
List of shipwrecks: 20 October 1825
Ship	State	Description
Blessing	United Kingdom	The ship was driven ashore in St Nicholas Bay, Kent. She was on a voyage from London to Dartmouth, Devon. Blessing was refloated on 26 October and taken in to Margate, Kent.
Dan	United Kingdom	The ship was driven ashore and wrecked on Tiree. Her crew were resscued. She was on a voyage from Wick, Caithness to Dublin.
Good Intent	United Kingdom	The ship capsized off Rame Head, Cornwall during a squall with the loss of three lives. She was on a voyage from Plymouth, Devon to Penzance, Cornwall. Good Intent was later towed into Helford, Cornwall.
Haphazard	United Kingdom	The Humber Keel capsized and sank off King's Lynn, Norfolk with the loss off all hands.
Honniford	Denmark	The ship was abandoned in the Atlantic Ocean. Her crew were rescued by Eliza (United Kingdom). Honniford was on a voyage from St. Ubes, Portugal to Copenhagen.
Lady Owen	United Kingdom	The ship was driven ashore and wrecked at Bideford, Devon. She was on a voyage from Youghal, County Cork to Portsmouth, Hampshire.
Maria Therese	France	The ship was wrecked on Edisto Island, South Carolina, United States. She was on a voyage from Guadeloupe to Wilmington, Delaware, United States.
Mary and Eliza	United Kingdom	The ship was lost near Wexford.
Thomas and Jane	United Kingdom	The ship was lost near Wexford. She was on a voyage from Glasgow, Renfrewshire to Cork.
Three Brothers	United Kingdom	The ship was wrecked at Pembrey, Carmarthenshire with the loss of all hands.
William the First	Netherlands	The whaler was lost off Den Helder, North Holland with the loss of 31 of the 47 people on board. The survivors were rescued by the Den Helder Lifeboat.

== 21 October ==
List of shipwrecks: 21 October 1825
Ship	State	Description
Anacreon	United Kingdom	The ship was driven ashore and wrecked near Fishguard, Pembrokeshire.
Charlotte	flag unknown	The ship was driven ashore and wrecked 5 nautical miles (9.3 km) west of Calais, France.
Indiana	Hamburg	The ship was driven ashore near Calais. She was on a voyage from Hamburg to Buenos Aires, Argentina. Indiana was refloated on 29 October and taken in to Calais.
James	United Kingdom	The ship was lost near St. Mary's, Nova Scotia, British North America. Her crew survived. She was on a voyage from Cape Breton Island, Nova Scotia to South Shields, County Durham.
Jane	United Kingdom	The ship was driven ashore at Yarmouth, Nova Scotia, British North America. She was on a voyage from the Clyde to Saint John, New Brunswick, British North America.
John & Jessy	United Kingdom	The ship was driven ashore on Holy Island. She was on a voyage from Liverpool to Leith.
Jong Jacob	Netherlands	The ship was wrecked on the Vogel Sand, in the North Sea. She was on a voyage from Antwerp to Hamburg.
Lavinia	United Kingdom	The ship was driven ashore near Glückstadt, Duchy of Holstein. She was later refloated and taken in to Hamburg.
Liberty	United Kingdom	The ship was driven ashore near Cromer, Norfolk. Her three crew were rescued by the Cromer Lifeboat. She was on a voyage from Boston, Lincolnshire to London.
Maria	United Kingdom	The ship was driven ashore at Ingoldmells, Lincolnshire. with the loss of two of her crew. Survivors were rescued by rocket apparatus. She was on a voyage from "Brackstadt" to Hull, Yorkshire.
Maria Augusta	Stettin	The ship was driven ashore and wrecked on Ameland. Friesland, United Kingdom of the Netherlands. Her crew were rescued. She was on a voyage from Stettin to London.
Mars	United Kingdom	The ship was driven ashore near Tetney, Lincolnshire. She was on a voyage from Quebec City, Lower Canada, British North America to Hull. She was refloated on 26 October and taken in to Hull.
Najade	Prussia	The ship struck the pier and sank at Danzig. She was on a voyage from London to Danzig.
Peggie	United Kingdom	The ship was driven ashore and wrecked at Heacham, Norfolk. Her crew were rescued.
Ribstone	United Kingdom	The ship was driven ashore near Scarborough, Yorkshire. She was refloated on 29 October and take in to Scarborough in a damaged condition.
Robert and Janet	United Kingdom	The sloop was wrecked on Lindisfarne, Northumberland with the loss of eight of the ten people on board.
Rochester	United Kingdom	The collier, a brig, was wrecked on the Corton Sand, in the North Sea off Lowestoft, Suffolk with the loss of all hands. She was on a voyage from North Shields, County Durham to London.
Vittoria	Spain	The ship foundered in the Atlantic Ocean. Her crew took to the boat and were rescued five days later by Balthazar (Hamburg). Vittoria was on a voyage from Adra to Liverpool, Lancashire, United Kingdom.

== 22 October ==
List of shipwrecks: 22 October 1825
Ship	State	Description
Clarkson	United Kingdom	The ship was severely damaged on the Green Island Reef. She was on a voyage from Hull, Yorkshire to Quebec City, Lower Canada, British North America.
Three Gebroeders	Netherlands	The ship was driven ashore on Terschelling, Friesland. She was on a voyage from Memel, Prussia to Amsterdam, North Holland.
Waller	United Kingdom	The ship foundered in the Atlantic Ocean off Rutland, County Donegal. Her crew were rescued.
Westmoreland	United Kingdom	The ship was abandoned in the Atlantic Ocean 15 leagues (45 nautical miles (83 km) west of the Isles of Scilly. Her crew were rescued by Charles (United Kingdom). Westmoreland was on a voyage from Quebec City, Lower Canada, British North America to Liverpool, Lancashire. She subsequently drifted ashore on the coast of Finistère, France and was taken in to a port near Brest.
Wilhelmina Catharina	Netherlands	The ship was driven ashore at Málaga, Spain. She was on a voyage from Naples, Kingdom of the Two Sicilies to Antwerp.

== 23 October ==
List of shipwrecks: 23 October 1825
Ship	State	Description
Clara	United States	The ship ran aground at Buenos Aires, Argentina. She was refloated but was declared a constructive total loss.
Mathilde	France	The brig was driven ashore and wrecked at Boulogne, Pas-de-Calais with the loss of all hands.

== 24 October ==
List of shipwrecks: 24 October 1825
Ship	State	Description
Brothers	United Kingdom	The ship foundered in the Formby Channel with the loss of all hands. She was on a voyage from Glasgow, Renfrewshire to Plymouth, Devon.
Christina	United Kingdom	The ship sank at Liverpool, Lancashire.
Don	United Kingdom	The ship was driven ashore crewless near "Macammock Fort". She was on a voyage from Saint Petersburg, Russia to Dublin.
Rosa	Kingdom of Sardinia	The ship was wrecked on Cape Cabrera, Spain. She was on a voyage from Genoa to Gibraltar.
Shannon	United Kingdom	The ship was driven ashore near Lytham St. Annes, Lancashire. She was on a voyage from Saint Petersburg to Liverpool. She was refloated the next day and taken in to Liverpool.

== 25 October ==
List of shipwrecks: 25 October 1825
Ship	State	Description
Brilliant	United Kingdom	The ship was driven ashore at Passage West, County Cork. She was on a voyage from Waterford to Cork.
Colne	United Kingdom	The smack was run down and sunk by Eolus (United Kingdom) in The Swin, off the coast of Essex with the loss of a crew member.
Flora	Sweden	The ship was wrecked on the Nas Reef. She was on a voyage from Stockholm to Amsterdam, North Holland, Netherlands.
Independent	United Kingdom	The ship ran aground on the Caloot Sandbank, in the North Sea off the coast of Zeeland, Netherlands. She was on a voyage from Antwerp, Netherlands to London. Independent was refloated on 29 October and taken in to Vlissingen, where she was condemned.
Lochiel	United Kingdom	The ship was wrecked on Coquet Island, Northumberland. she was on a voyage from Inverness to Newcastle upon Tyne, Northumberland.
Minerva	United Kingdom	The ship capsized at the mouth of the River Thaw. All on board were rescued. She was on a voyage from Milford Haven, Pembrokeshire to Bristol, Gloucestershire.

== 26 October ==
List of shipwrecks: 26 October 1825
Ship	State	Description
Lucy	United Kingdom	The ship foundered in Carnarvon Bay. Her crew were rescued.
Rambler	United Kingdom	The ship sprang a leak and was beached at Cape George, Nova Scotia, British North America. Her crew were rescued. She was on a voyage from Richibucto, New Brunswick, British North America to Liverpool, Lancashire.

== 27 October ==
List of shipwrecks: 27 October 1825
Ship	State	Description
Henry	United Kingdom	The ship was driven ashore and wrecked at Richibucto Head, New Brunswick, British North America. She was on a voyage from Greenock, Renfrewshire to Richibucto, New Brunswick.
Michael	United Kingdom	The ship was driven ashore on Terschelling, Friesland, Netherlands. Her crew were rescued. She was on a voyage from Moss, Norway to Wexford.
William Gray	United States	The ship was wrecked in the Abaco Islands. Her crew were rescued. She was on a voyage from New York to Matanzas, Cuba.

== 28 October ==
List of shipwrecks: 28 October 1825
Ship	State	Description
Harlingen	Netherlands	The ship was wrecked on the coast of West Flanders. All on board survived. She was on a voyage from Surinam to Amsterdam, North Holland.
Lucy	United Kingdom	The ship foundered in Carnarvon Bay. Her crew were rescued.

== 29 October ==
List of shipwrecks: 29 October 1825
Ship	State	Description
Betsey	United Kingdom	The ship was wrecked off Terschelling, Friesland, Netherlands.
Libero	Grand Duchy of Tuscany	The ship was driven ashore near Alicante, Spain. She was on a voyage from Amsterdam, North Holland, Netherlands to Genoa, Kingdom of Sardinia and Livorno.

== 30 October ==
List of shipwrecks: 30 October 1825
Ship	State	Description
Aid	United Kingdom	The sloop was driven ashore and wrecked at Girdleness Point, Aberdeenshire. Her crew were rescued.
Eliza	United Kingdom	The ship ran aground on the Sculmartin Rock, in the Irish Sea. She was on a voyage from Bangor, County Down to Newcastle upon Tyne, Northumberland. Eliza was refloated on 1 November and taken in to Donaghadee, County Antrim for repairs.
Friends	United Kingdom	The ship was driven ashore in Widewall Bay, Orkney Islands. She was on a voyage from Wick, Caithness to Liverpool, Lancashire.
Friends	United Kingdom	The ship was driven ashore and wrecked in the Orkney Islands whilst on a voyage from Wick, Caithness to South Ronaldsay, Orkney Islands.
Marmont	United Kingdom	The ship was driven ashore and severely damaged near Cullercoats, Ayrshire. She was later refloated and taken in to North Shields, County Durham
Nancy	United Kingdom	The sloop was driven ashore in Widewall Bay, Orkney Islands. She was on a voyage from the River Spey to "Shildag".
Providence	United Kingdom	The ship was driven ashore crewless at Largs, Ayrshire.

== 31 October ==
List of shipwrecks: 31 October 1825
Ship	State	Description
Cumbrian	United Kingdom	The ship was driven ashore at Whitehaven, Cumberland. She was on a voyage from Harrington, Cumberland to Dublin. Cumbrian was refloated the next day and taken in to Whitehaven.
Fanny	United Kingdom	The ship was wrecked near Loch Erribol. She was on a voyage from Memel, Prussia to Sligo.
Helen	United Kingdom	The ship foundered in the Atlantic Ocean with the loss of all but one of her crew. She was on a voyage from Gibraltar to New York, United States.
Lady Endergally	United Kingdom	The sloop was driven ashore crewless at Southfield, Cumberland.

== Unknown date ==
List of shipwrecks: Unknown in October date 1825
Ship	State	Description
Baron of Renfrew	United Kingdom	During a voyage from Quebec City, Lower Canada, British North America, to London, the timber drogher ran aground on the Long Sand in the North Sea off the coast of Essex, England, and 5 nautical miles (9.3 km) southeast of the Sunk Lightship ( Trinity House) on either 13 or 16 October. She was abandoned by 26 members of her crew. She was refloated on 18 October, but was waterlogged and her captain, officers, and the remaining 22 members of her crew abandoned her on 21 October. Her wreck came ashore in three pieces on the coast of France between Gravelines and Dunkirk, Nord, on 24 October.
Bee	United Kingdom	The ship was wrecked on the coast of Pembrokeshire with the loss of all hands.
Benson	United Kingdom	The ship was wrecked at St. John's, Newfoundland, British North America. Her crew were rescued by Cornhill (United Kingdom).
Blessing	United Kingdom	The ship was wrecked on the coast of Pembrokeshire with the loss of all hands.
Brothers	United Kingdom	The ship was wrecked at Abermawr, Pembrokeshire. her crew were rescued. She was on a voyage from Memel, Prussia to Haverfordwest, Pembrokeshire.
Desire Ann	(United Kingdom of Great Britain and Ireland) British North America	The ship was abandoned in the Atlantic Ocean on or before 20 October.
Earl Dalhousie	(United Kingdom of Great Britain and Ireland) British North America	The ship was wrecked at Petty Harbour, Newfoundland. She was on a voyage from Quebec City, Lower Canada to St. John's, Newfoundland.
Fame	United Kingdom	The ship was abandoned in the Baltic Sea off Danzig.
Gleaner	United Kingdom	The ship was wrecked in the Atlantic Ocean and was abandoned, Her crew were rescued by Cornhill (United Kingdom).
Governor Meyers	United Kingdom	The ship was driven ashore at Saltfleet, Lincolnshire.
Horatio	United Kingdom	The schooner was driven ashore and wrecked on the coast of Pembrokeshire with the loss of one of her eight crew.
Jane	United Kingdom	The ship was driven ashore at Barmouth, Merionethshire. Her crew were rescued. She was on a voyage from Porthmadog, Caernarfonshire to Cardiff, Glamorgan.
Joseph and Anne	United Kingdom	The ship was driven ashore and wrecked at Calais, France between 17 and 20 October. Her crew were rescued. She was on a voyage from Portsmouth, Hampshire to Antwerp, Netherlands.
Linnet	United Kingdom	The ship was driven ashore at Barmouth. Her crew were rescued.
Nicholas	United Kingdom	The ship foundered in the Irish Sea. Her crew were rescued. She was on a voyage from Maryport, Cumberland to Dumfries.
Norden	Sweden	The ship was driven ashore and wrecked at Calais between 17 and 20 October. Her crew were rescued. She was on a voyage from Rouen, Seine-Inférieure, France to Stockholm.
Rolla	United Kingdom	The ship was lost on the coast of Empire of Brazil. She was on a voyage from Buenos Aires, Argentina to Havana, Cuba.
Scipio	United Kingdom	The ship was driven ashore on Saltholm, Denmark. She was later refloated.
