= Baron Inverclyde =

Extinct barony in the Peerage of the United Kingdom

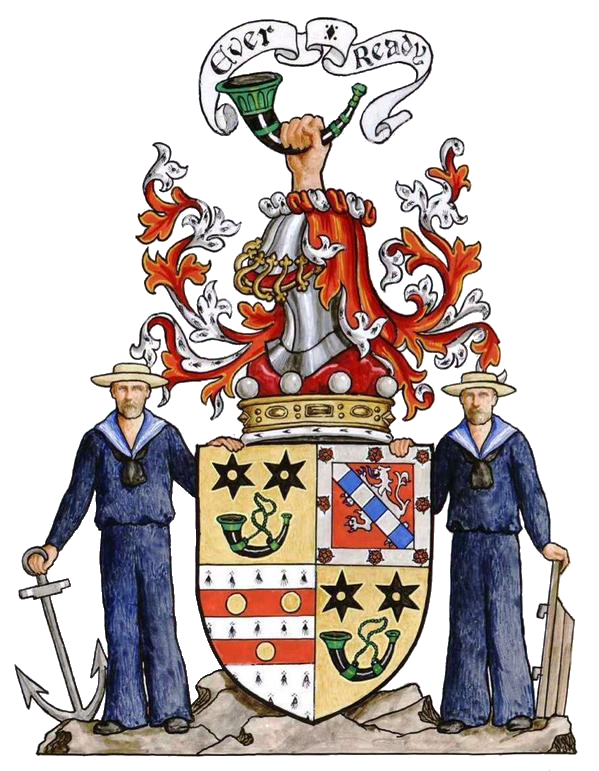
Arms of the Lord Inverclyde

Baron Inverclyde, of Castle Wemyss in the County of Renfrew, was a title in the Peerage of the United Kingdom. It was created in 1897 for the Scottish shipowner Sir John Burns, 2nd Baronet. The Baronetcy had been created in the Baronetage of the United Kingdom on 28 July 1889 for George Burns. The titles became extinct on the death without issue of the fourth Baron in 1957.

== Burns of Wemyss Bay, Baronets (1889) ==
- Sir George Burns, 1st Baronet (1795–1890)
- Sir John Burns, 2nd Baronet (1829–1901) Created Baron Inverclyde

== Barons Inverclyde (1897) ==
- John Burns, 1st Baron Inverclyde (1829–1901)
- George Arbuthnot Burns, 2nd Baron Inverclyde (1861–1905)
- James Cleland Burns, 3rd Baron Inverclyde (1864–1919)
- (John) Alan Burns, 4th Baron Inverclyde (1897–1957)

Baronetage of the United Kingdom
Preceded by Mackinnon baronets	Burns baronets of Wemyss Bay; 28 July 1889	Succeeded by Whitehead baronets
