= John Burns, 1st Baron Inverclyde =

Scottish ship owner (1829–1901)

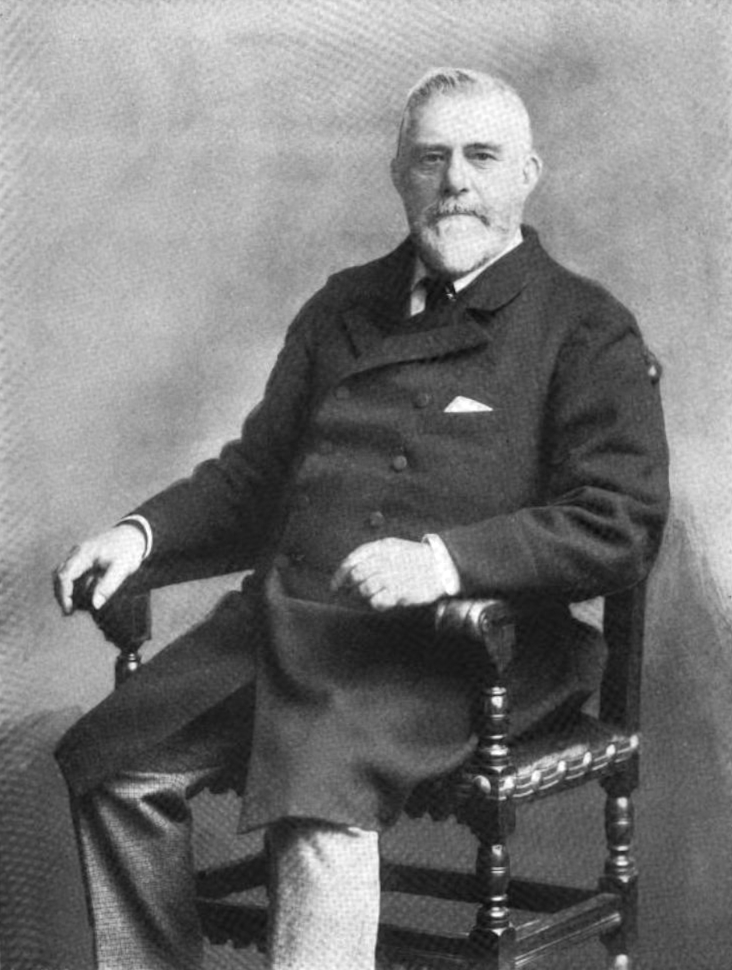
- Born: 24 June 1829; Glasgow, Scotland
- Died: 12 February 1901 (aged 71); Castle Wemyss, Scotland
- Education: Glasgow University
- Occupation: Ship owner
- Spouse: Emily Arbuthnot (m. 1860)

John Burns, 1st Baron Inverclyde, FRGS (24 June 1829 – 12 February 1901) was a Scottish ship owner.

== Biography ==
Born in Glasgow he was the son of Sir George Burns, 1st Baronet, a founder of the shipping company G & J Burns and a partner in the Cunard Steamship Co. and his wife, Jane Cleland. After school, he attended Glasgow University and took the general arts degree before joining the family firm about 1850. He married Emily (d. 1901), daughter of George Clerk Arbuthnot, in 1860, with whom he had two sons and three daughters.

As a young man he had been in the Crimea at the fall of Sevastopol in 1855; he had subsequently been an advocate of good coastal defences and was the first to suggest to the government the use of merchant vessels for war purposes.

His father handed over control of the family businesses to him in 1860, the year he married, and he became a key figure, first as a partner, then as chairman, in the reconstruction and subsequent flotation of Cunard in 1878. Cunard began to replace its fleet of wooden paddle steamers with iron ships, first paddle driven, but increasingly employing the screw propeller. The first iron screw steamer was the China in 1862. Burns was particularly keen on economy, and the Cunard Line quickly adopted the new compound engine with the Batavia in 1870. Under Burns, Cunard was also quick to order a steel vessel, the first in their service being the SS Servia in 1881, which, apart from the Great Eastern, was the largest liner afloat at the time.

By the 1890s, following his father's death, he began the process of handing on the management to his two sons, George and James. George A. Burns followed as Cunard chairman, as well as being partner and director of G. and J. Burns Ltd. James C. Burns, was widely involved in Clyde shipping circles and became chairman of the Glasgow Shipowners' Association at that time.

Lord Inverclyde was a deputy lieutenant of Renfrewshire, of Lanarkshire, as well as of the county of the city of Glasgow. He was also a justice of the peace in Renfrewshire. As an honorary lieutenant in the Royal Naval Reserve, Burns was involved in setting up a training ship scheme which was established on HMS Cumberland. He travelled widely, and was a Fellow of The Royal Geographical Society. He was also a member of the Royal Yacht Squadron, The Travellers', and The Glasgow Clubs.

He was author of several literary works, including A Wild Night, Glimpses of Glasgow Low Life, and, in 1887, The Adaption of Merchant Ships for War Purposes.

He inherited his father's Baronetcy in 1890 and was created Baron Inverclyde, of Castle Wemyss in the county Renfrew on 28 July 1897. Burns had acquired Castle Wemyss from Charles Wilsone Brown of Wemyss Bay in 1860, and had the building enlarged and remodelled in Scottish Baronial style by Robert William Billings.

In 1878, John Burns and his wife accompanied several other people, including writer Anthony Trollope, on a trip to Iceland aboard the Burns ship Mastiff. Trollope described the trip in his book How the 'Mastiffs' went to Iceland. He died at Castle Wemyss on 12 February 1901; his wife Emily, dying the next day. They were interred together. He was succeeded by his son, George Arbuthnot Burns, 2nd Baron Inverclyde (1861–1905)

Baronetage of the United Kingdom
Preceded by George Burns	Baronet (of Wemyss Bay); 1890 – 1901	Succeeded by George Burns
Peerage of the United Kingdom
New creation	Baron Inverclyde; 1897 – 1901	Succeeded by George Burns
