= Robert William Billings =

British architect and author (1812–1874)

Robert William Billings (London 25 July 1812 – 14 November 1874 London) was a British architect and author. He trained as a topographical draughtsman, wrote and illustrated many books early in his career, before concentrating on his architectural practice.

== Life ==
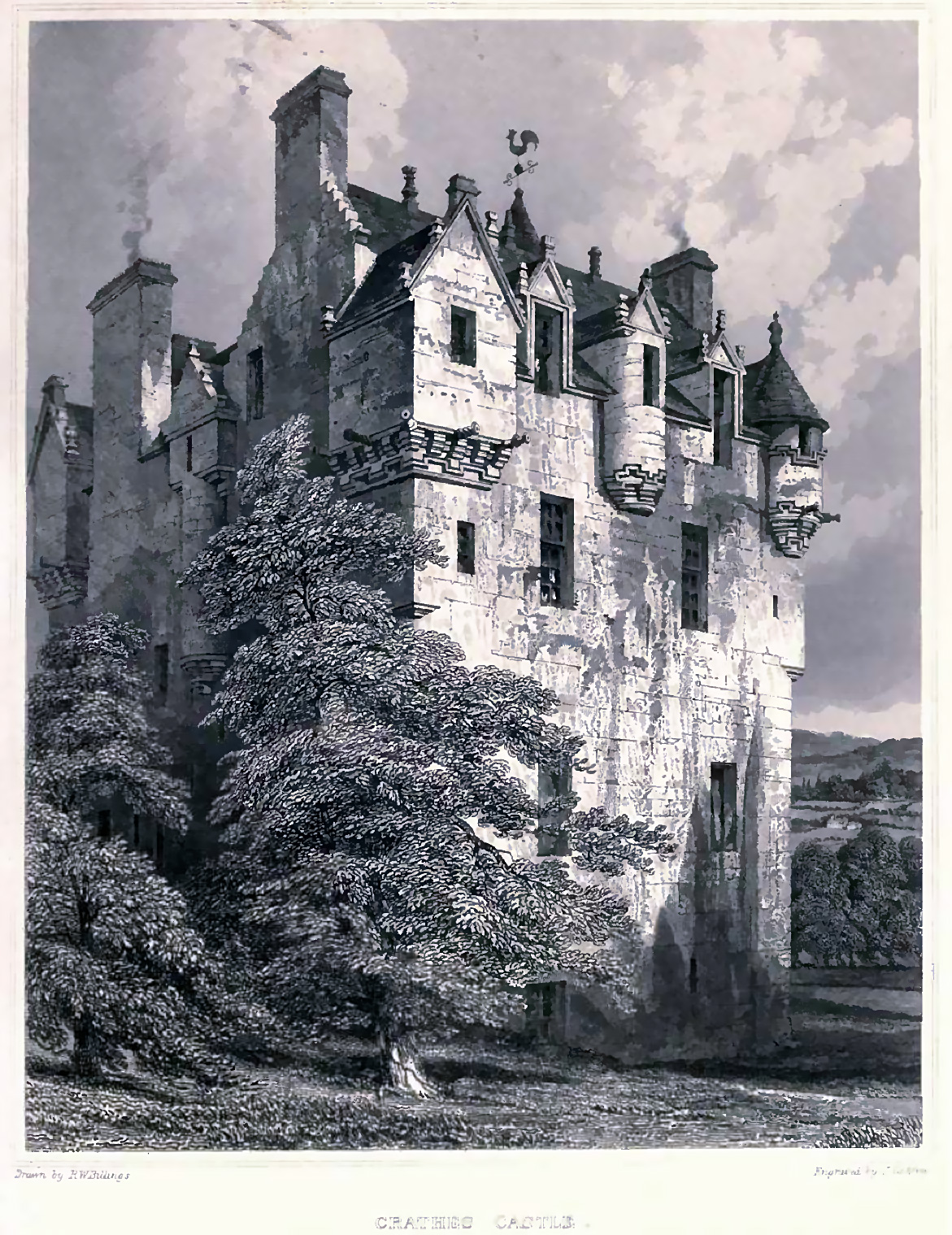
Crathes Castle, an illustration from Billings' Baronial and Ecclesiastical Antiquities of Scotland

Billings was born in the Bayswater area of London in 1812. At the age of thirteen he was apprenticed to the topographical draughtsman John Britton for seven years. In 1837 he illustrated George Godwin's History and Description of St. Paul's Cathedral, and two years later, with Frederick Mackenzie, the two volumes of Godwin's Churches of London. He assisted Sir Jeffry Wyattville on drawings of Windsor Castle, and prepared many views of the ruins of the old Houses of Parliament after the fire.

The works he undertook on his own account included Illustrations of the Temple Church, London, (1838); Gothic Panelling in Brancepeth Church, Durham (1841) and Kettering Church, Northamptonshire (1843). He produced important works on Carlisle Cathedral and Durham Cathedral, published in 1840 and 1843, and Illustrations of the Architectural Antiquities of the County of Durham (1846). The work for which he became best known was The Baronial and Ecclesiastical Antiquities of Scotland, published in four volumes between 1845 and 1852, which contained 240 illustrations, with explanatory text. The work was a great success and was reprinted several times, in 1899, 1900, 1901, 1908, 1909, 2008, 2012, 2015, 2016 and 2017. In the 1901 edition it was revealed that all the commentaries were written by John Hill Burton, the edition included a foreword by Robert Rowand Anderson. Anderson wrote in the foreword of it being "in the front rank of Architectural publications, and from this position it has yet to be displaced."

His other published works were An Attempt to define the Geometric Proportions of Gothic Architecture, as illustrated by the Cathedrals of Carlisle and Worcester (1840) Illustrations of Geometric Tracery, from the panelling belonging to Carlisle Cathedral 1842; The Infinity of Geometric Design exemplified (1849) and The Power of Form applied to Geometric Tracery (1851).

The Attempt to Define the Geometric Proportions of Gothic Architecture has been the subject of scholarly interpretation. A reviewer in The Art Journal explained that Billings had deduced that the architect of Carlisle Cathedral:

had been guided by the repetition of a circle whose diameter was the extreme width of the building; that the distribution and even the substance of the columns were settled by some subdivision of the same circle; and lastly, that a circle regulated by the width of the compartments thus formed, was the basis upon which the heights of the various portions of the building were framed.

Eventually, he gave up authorship and devoted himself entirely to his architectural practice. He was employed on the restoration of the chapel of Edinburgh Castle (a government commission); the Douglas Room in Stirling Castle; Gosford House, Haddingtonshire, for the Earl of Wemyss; the restoration of Hanbury Hall, Worcestershire; Crosby-on-Eden Church, Cumberland and Kemble House and Vicarage, Wiltshire. In 1865 Billings erected an unusual memorial to fellow architect Peter Nicholson (1765–1844) in Carlisle cemetery, in the form of a pair of interpenetrating obelisks.

From 1865 Billings lived at Putney, where he purchased the Moulinère, a house once occupied by the Duchess of Marlborough. He died there 14 November 1874.

== Publications ==
- Infinity of geometric design exemplified (first published 1844)
- Illustrations of the architectural antiquities of the County of Durham (first published 1845)
- The baronial and ecclesiastical antiquities of Scotland (1845–1852)
- The power of form applied to geometric tracery (1851)
