= Inverkip =

Coordinates: 55.907032°N 4.8703390°W

Inverkip: Scottish Gaelic: Inbhir Chip
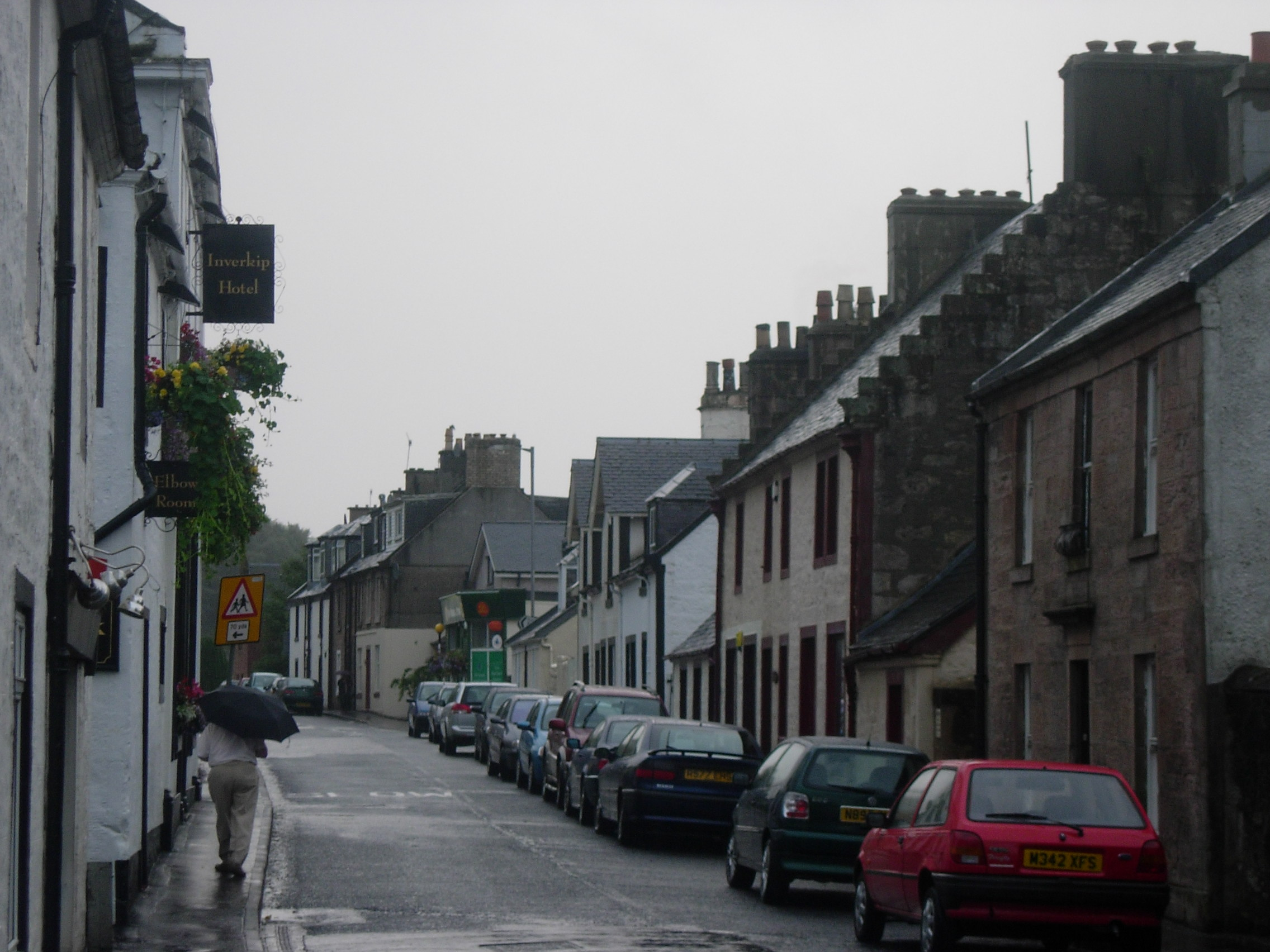
- Inverkip's Main Street

- Location within Inverclyde
- Population: 3,490 (2020)
- OS grid reference: NS 20675 71938
- Council area: Inverclyde
- Lieutenancy area: Renfrewshire
- Country: Scotland
- Sovereign state: United Kingdom
- Post town: GREENOCK
- Postcode district: PA16
- Dialling code: 01475
- Police: Scotland
- Fire: Scottish
- Ambulance: Scottish
- UK Parliament: Inverclyde
- Scottish Parliament: Greenock and Inverclyde

Inverkip (/ˌɪnvərˈkɪp/; Scottish Gaelic: Inbhir Chip) is a village and parish in the Inverclyde council area and historic county of Renfrewshire in the west central Lowlands of Scotland, 5 miles (8 km) southwest of Greenock and 8.1 miles (13 km) north of Largs on the A78 trunk road. The town takes its name from the River Kip and is served by Inverkip railway station.

== History ==
=== Origins ===
In 1170 Baldwin de Bigres, Sheriff of Lanark, granted a stretch of land to the monks of Paisley Abbey. This land was described as "The pennyland between the rivulets Kip and Daff". Pennyland is an old Scots word of Norse origin which is used to describe a small piece of land, the rent for which is one penny per year.

The area granted to the monks in 1170 equates to much of the north section of today's village, from the bridge over the Daff on Main Street, near Inverkip Hotel to the old bridge over the River Kip at Bridgend Cottages. Extending to the coast at the old bridge at Kip Marina and probably as far inland as the railway line.

Inverkip was made a burgh of barony before the Act of Union in 1707, with the parish containing all of Gourock, Wemyss Bay, Skelmorlie and part of Greenock.

=== Inverkip Church ===
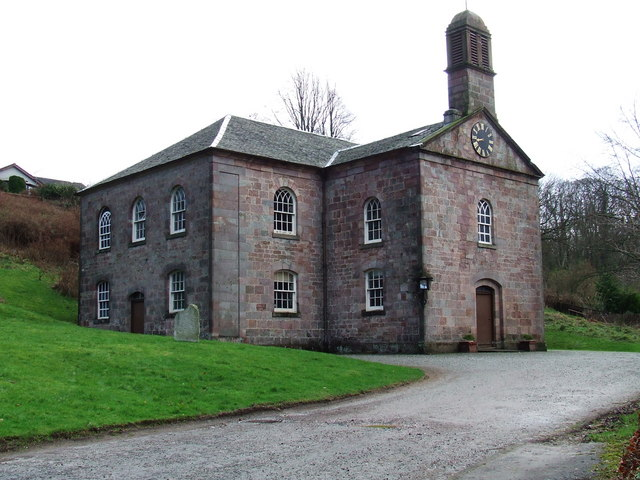
Inverkip Parish Church

By 1188, the monks had built a church on the site of the present old graveyard, at what is now the junction of Langhouse Road and Millhouse Road. This small church (known as Auld Kirk) served the entire Christian population between Kilmacolm and Largs for around 400 years. The existing (derelict) mausoleum of the Shaw-Stewarts stands on the site of the original church and incorporates some of its structure. The Christians of Greenock presented a petition to the Crown for a church of their own. This resulted in the opening in 1591 of the kirk in Greenock, later known as the Old West Kirk, and brought to an end the regular 5.5 miles (8.9 km) each way treks by Sunday worshipers from Greenock to Inverkip. A journey which must have been very demanding, given the terrain and the absence of proper roads during that period. In 1594 the lands of Greenock, Finnart, and Spangock were assigned to the new parish of Greenock, and by 1636 Greenock parish included Easter in Greenock and various other lands.

The present church building on Langhouse Road was completed in 1805, reputedly to a plan by the civil engineer Thomas Telford, but there is no evidence to support this and the design of Inverkip Church is quite different from the known 'Telford Kirks' which were built during the same period. The church building is described by Historic Environment Scotland as "2-storey type; simple Renaissance with upper windows round-headed; open belfry at front gable; (1804-5). Clock on pediment several of windows blocked up, but fenestration pattern kept in black & white".

The church hall and manse were built during the 1960s and stand across Langhouse Road from the church itself. The old manse (now known as Kirkbrae House) is also on Langhouse Road, between the original and present churches. It was built in 1730 and is now a private residence.

=== Ardgowan ===
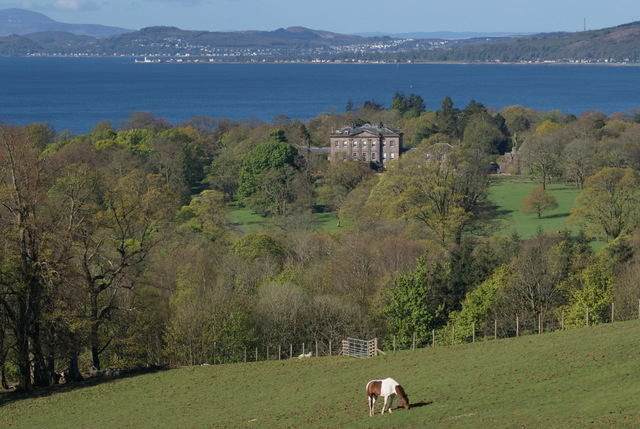
Ardgowan House with the Firth of Clyde beyond. Viewed from Bargane Hill.

By the 13th century, a castle had been built at what is now Ardgowan House. This early castle changed hands between the Scots and the English during the Wars of Independence. Robert The Bruce fought here for both sides during this period. The land was acquired by the Stewarts in 1390 and they built the existing castle during the 15th century. Contained in the gardens of Ardgowan House and away from the public eye, it consists of a three-storey square keep with a garret. The main entrance is at first floor level and is accessed by an external stairway. The castle was abandoned as a residence when Ardgowan House was built by the Shaw-Stewarts in 1799–1801. Following construction of Ardgowan House, the first proper road to Greenock was constructed by Sir John Shaw Stewart and opened in 1803.

Ardgowan House served as a military hospital during both world wars and has the distinction of being the first Scottish military hospital to be damaged by German bombs. The damage was slight and no casualties were recorded, but many windows at the house were smashed.

=== Witchcraft and witch hunts ===
Inverkip was a hotbed of witchcraft activity for half a century from 1640 to 1690. The Ministers of the parish at the time, the Rev John Hamilton (1626 to 1664) and Rev Alexander Leslie (1665 to 1684) were noted as being ‘zealous persecutors of witches’. A Royal Enquiry into the Inverkip witch hunts, which have been compared to those at Salem, was led by Archibald Stewart of Blackhall. During this enquiry 18 year old Marie Lamont was tried as a witch before the Commission, Sir Archibald and the Rev John Hamilton. Marie confessed that ‘Jean King, Kattie Scott, Janet Holm, herself and sundry others, met together in the mirk, at the bucht-gait of Ardgowan whar, the devil was with them in the shape of a black man with cloven feet, and directit them to fetch whyte sand fre the shore, and cast it about yetts of Ardgowan and about the ministers hous’. Marie was found guilty of witchcraft and burned at the stake, the fate of the others is not known.

A local verse recalls another notable character during this period:

"In Auld Kirk the witches ride thick
And in Dunrod they dwell;
But the greatest loon amang them a'
Is Auld Dunrod himsel'."

'Auld Dunrod' was the last of the Lindsay family of Dunrod Castle. As the result of a dissolute life he lost all his possessions and fell into the black arts. Local reputation had it that he was in league with the devil, and he died in mysterious circumstances in a barn belonging to one of his former tenant farmers. Nothing now remains of the castle which stood at the foot of Dunrod Hill.

=== Shaws water scheme ===
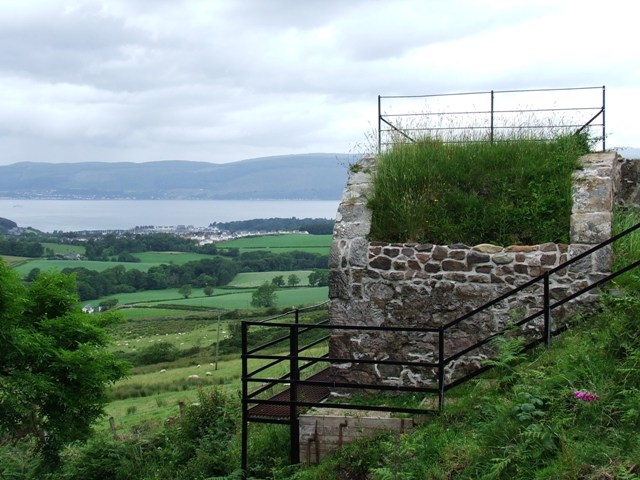
A valve house on the Cut, with Inverkip beyond

Commissioned by Sir Michael Shaw Stewart, 5th Baronet and designed by industrialist Robert Thom of Rothesay, this grand water supply scheme in the hills behind the village was completed in 1827. It entailed the damming of Shaws Water (a small stream on the other side of the hills from Greenock) to create what is now known as Loch Thom. The Greenock Cut was also created to supply water from the loch, around the hills, to the town of Greenock for domestic and industrial purposes.

The scheme was still in use as recently as 1971, at which time it was made obsolete by the boring of a tunnel through Whinhill.

=== Cholera outbreak ===
1849 was a disastrous year for the village; not only did the crops fail, but one third of the population died due to an outbreak of cholera.

=== Smuggling ===
During the late 18th century and early 19th century, the village was noted for smuggling activities involving the illicit transfer of alcohol, tea and tobacco from vessels heading up the Firth of Clyde to the ports of Greenock and Port Glasgow.

One well known case is that of Thomas Finnie, a local milkman, whose tale is recorded in the records of the Innerkip Society:

Early in the morning of the 22nd of December, 1809, about 6 am, Thomas Spence, Supervisor of Excise in Greenock, could have been seen – suitably armed with pistol, etc – riding through the slush to Inverkip accompanied by two other officers. Almost exhausted and perished with the cold after their unusual errand they espied Thomas Finnie’s milk cart. They lay in wait near the Daff burn and when Thomas had reached that point on his way to the “big house” with his morning delivery, the command to halt came from Spence. Mr Spence immediately searched the cart and in addition to the usual and necessary commodity of milk, he found three casks of Highland whisky containing in all 30 gallons. The horse, cart, milk and whisky and, of course, Thomas, were seized and taken in charge when, suddenly, Spence spotted Robert Cochrane some distance off. Cochrane was also searched and his cart was found to contain 50 gallons of Whisky. Both carts, their contents and their owners were marched on to Greenock Bridewell.

=== Railway ===
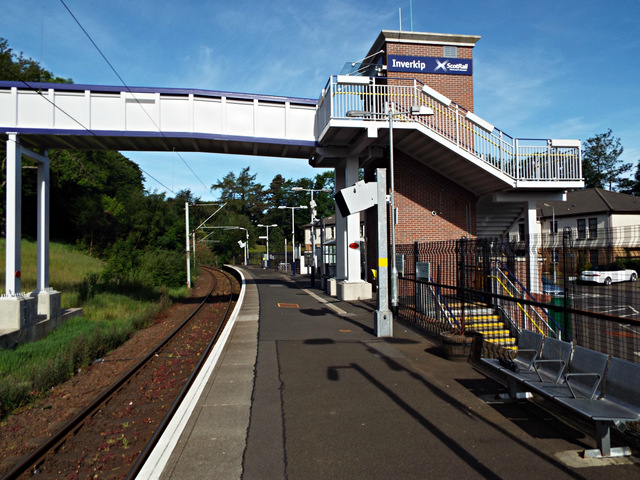
Inverkip Railway Station

1865 saw the opening of the Port Glasgow to Wemyss Bay line by the Greenock and Wemyss Bay Railway Company, with the trains being operated by the Caledonian Railway Company. A station was opened at Inverkip in 1867 and this resulted in the transformation of Inverkip from a rural agricultural village community to being more of a seaside resort busy with railway trippers from Greenock and Glasgow. A jetty near the present day War Memorial served ferry boats which tendered to the passing Paddle Steamers. The railway line was electrified in 1967 and has been served by EMUs (Electric Multiple Units) of various classes since then. The line was made single track at this time, which resulted in Inverkip station being reduced to a single platform and losing its bridges across the line. A new footbridge across the line was opened in 2014, with a lift to provide wheelchair access as there was insufficient space for ramp access on the downhill side.

=== Energy supplies ===
By 1900 a gas supply was piped to the village from Bankfoot, which was the home farm of Ardgowan Estate and which is located around a mile outside the village on the road to Greenock. The 1913 OS 25 inch map shows a gasometer at the farm

Electricity arrived in the village in 1932, supplied from the Hydro scheme in nearby Skelmorlie.

=== World War II ===
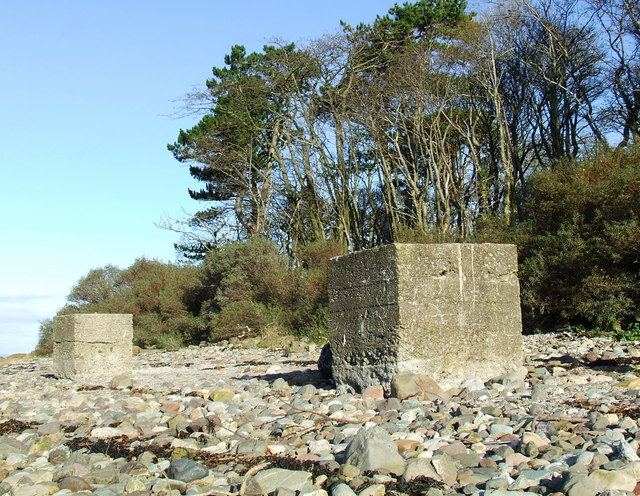
Tank Traps, Ardgowan Point

The mouth of Kip Water was excavated in 1940 by the Army Royal Engineers Unit to enable the storage of barges. After the war, this excavated area became a popular bathing and boating area with locals and day-trippers alike.

Two large concrete blocks on the beach nearby are probably tank traps, a relic of this time.

Kip Marina now stands on the site of the WWII excavation.

The army built and occupied 28 houses in Daff Avenue at this time. These houses survive today and can be seen just off Main Street at Langhouse Road.

=== Housing ===
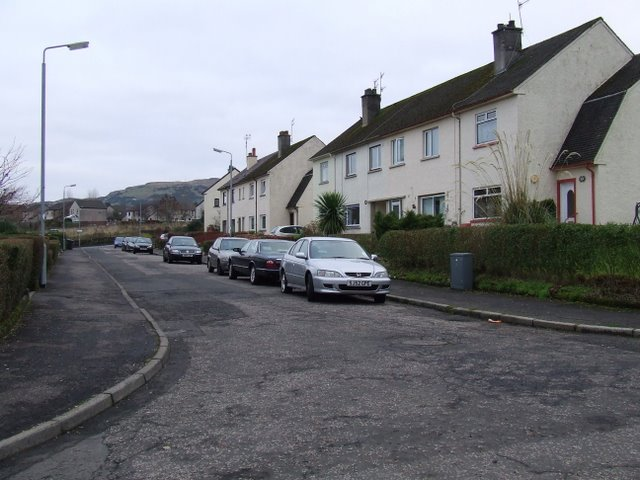
Glebe Road houses

From 1951-1957 Renfrewshire County Council built the Crawford Lane and Glebe Road housing scheme. This development lies on the high ground at Langhouse Road, behind the present church building. This provided much needed affordable, good quality housing to local people in the immediate post-WWII years.

Since the 1980s the village has seen many large private housing developments completed, including off Langhouse Road, Swallow Brae, Kip Marina and several at the 'Hill Farm' site off Finnockbog Road. Further housing developments are planned at the former power station site.

The village now serves largely as a dormitory to Greenock and the major towns beyond.

=== Road transport ===
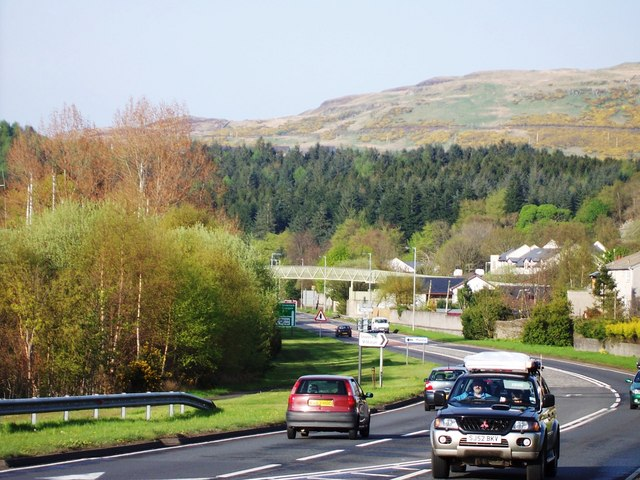
The A78 Inverkip Bypass

The village stands on the A78 coast road which runs from Greenock to Monkton, near Prestwick Airport. Main Street was the A78 road until the bypass opened in the early 1970s.

The single carriageway bypass road was designed with wide margins to provide long sight lines and to enable future construction of a dual carriageway if traffic demanded it. Evidence of this can be seen at the flyover at the power station access road, which is dual carriageway, with just one side being used.

Despite the bypass, Main Street is still congested due to the presence of many parked cars.

=== Inverkip power station ===
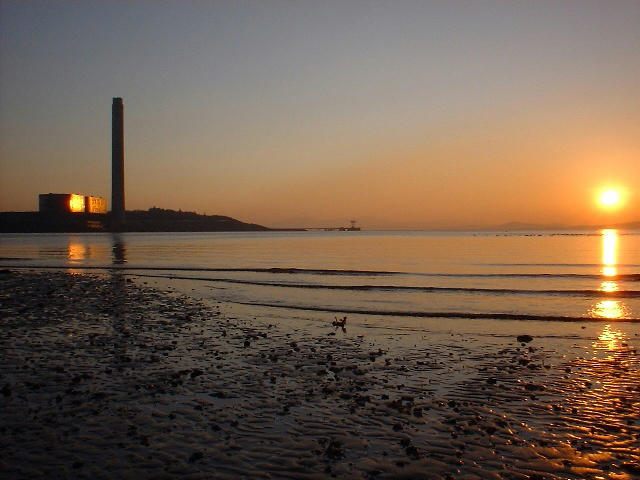
Inverkip Power Station

Inverkip power station was an oil-fired power station which was constructed during the 1970s and demolished between 2010 and 2015. Due to the increase in oil prices as a result of the 1973 Oil Crisis, the station was never used commercially to full capacity (except during the UK miners' strike (1984–85)). Power generation stopped in 1988 and the station was kept in reserve before being mothballed in the late 1990s. It was decommissioned in 2006. at which time some of the equipment was sold and transferred to other power stations around the country.

The 774-foot (236 m) chimney was the tallest free standing structure in Scotland and the third tallest in the UK when it was built in 1976.

=== Population ===
Since its origins, the village population has grown from around 200 to around 3500 (2022 Census). The population of the village has doubled since the 1980s housing boom.

Scotland's 2022 Census records the population of Inverkip as 3548. As a result of this population increase the Scottish Government updated the legislation governing classification of settlements. With a population over 3000, Inverkip is now classified as an 'accessible small town'.

== Places of interest ==
=== Kip Marina ===
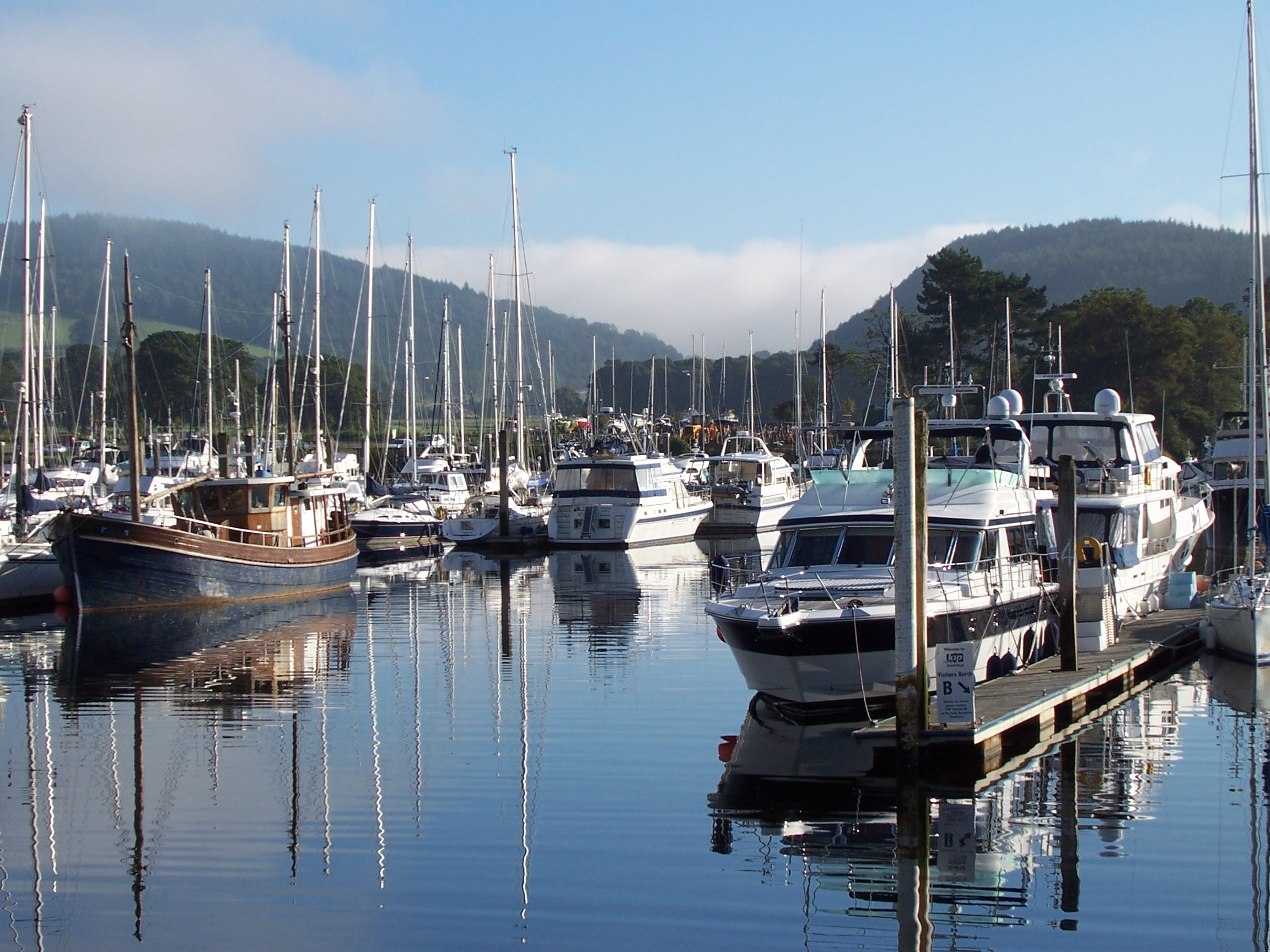
Kip Marina

Today Inverkip is most notable for Kip Marina, which was the first marina in Scotland and one of only three in the UK when it opened in 1971.

Located at the mouth of Kip Water in an area that was excavated for use as barge storage during WWII, the marina has grown steadily over the years and now has over 600 berths and associated marine services such as a chandlery, sales and repair services.

The Chartroom bar & restaurant at the marina caters not only for sailors, but also the wider community, including the adjacent Kip Marina Village which is a housing estate which was established in the 2000s.

The marina hosts the annual Scotland's Boat Show each October.

=== Greenock Cut Visitor Centre ===
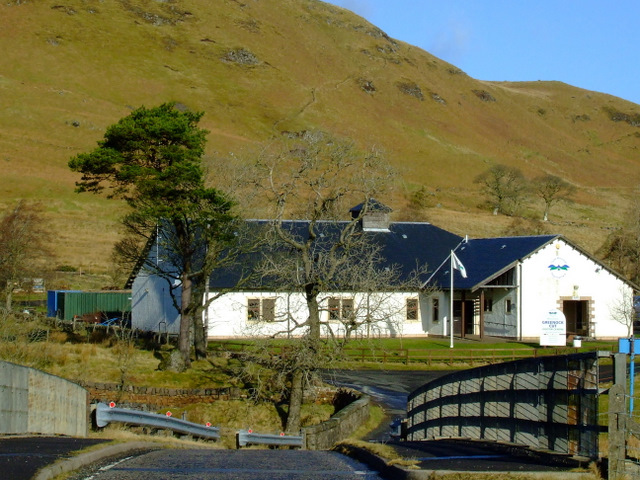
Greenock Cut Visitor Centre

The Centre (known as Cornalees Bridge Visitor Centre prior to 2011) is around three miles (5 km) east of Inverkip on Dunrod road at Cornalees Bridge.

It lies within Clyde Muirshiel Regional Park and is the base for the Inverclyde Ranger Service. The centre includes a small display which describes the history of "The Cut". The centre has toilets and a large free car park. Toilets are open daily, while the centre is only open when the Rangers are on duty and working in or near the visitor centre. Best to call ahead if you want to see inside.

A 7-mile (11.25 km) circular walk from the visitor centre offers views of Loch Thom and the surrounding reservoirs as well as views of the Firth of Clyde and the south Highlands. This walk is virtually traffic-free and is suitable for mountain bikes, although they must give way to walkers as the path on the Cut is narrow

=== Lunderston Bay ===
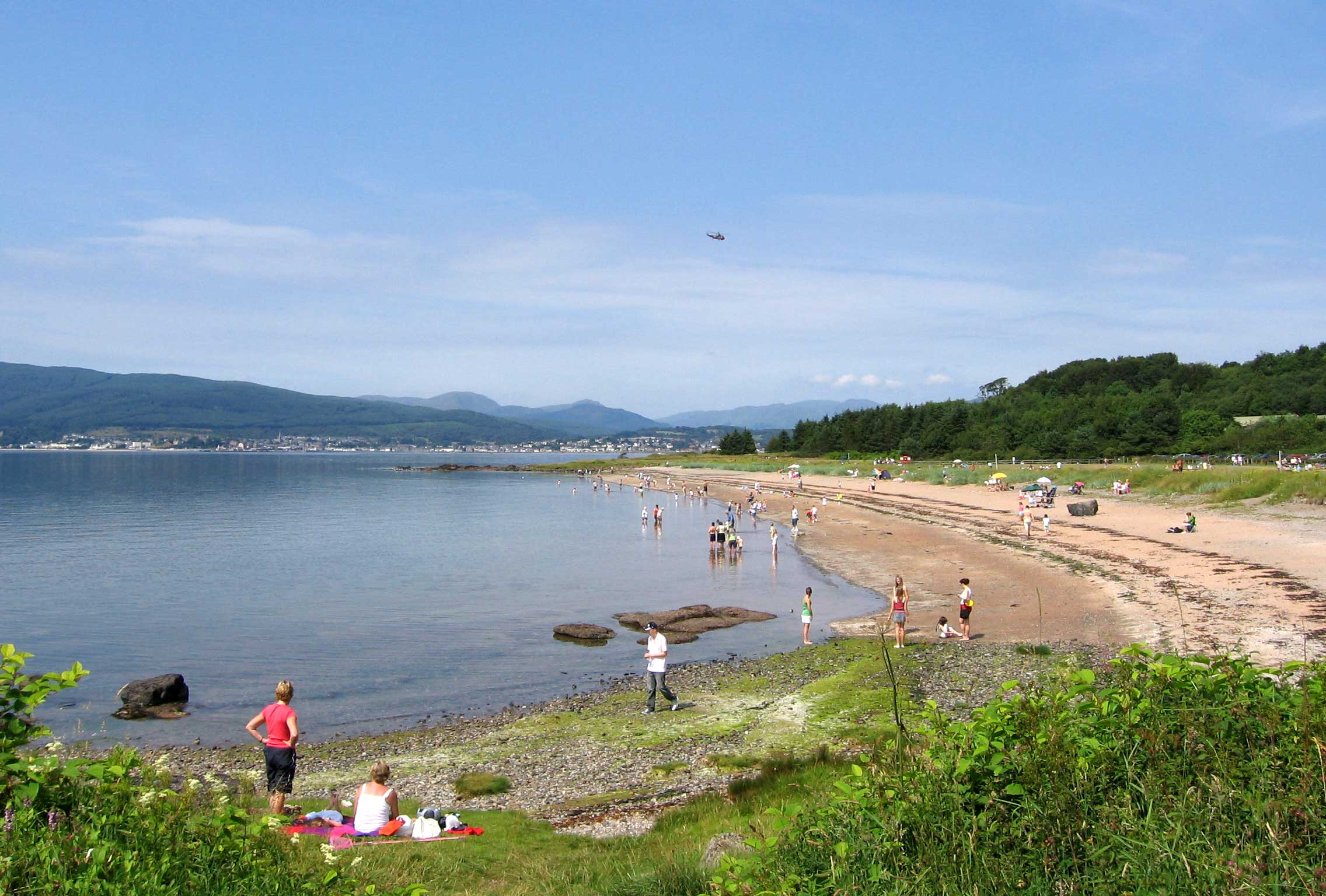
Lunderston Bay Beach

Also part of the regional park is Lunderston Bay, a popular picnic spot on the Firth of Clyde which has a ranger service and toilet facilities.

The bay is visited by bird watchers, hikers, cyclists and dog walkers. During the summer months it is a popular place for picnics and sea bathing.

A coastal path (part of the National Cycle Network, Route 75) runs south from the bay to Inverkip, via Ardgowan Estate and Kip Marina. Seals and several species of bird can be seen from the path all year round. A pod of orcas (killer whales) was spotted here in early 2018.

Cardwell Garden Centre at the bay sells wide range of plants plus home and garden related equipment and tools. It has a large restaurant.

=== Inverkip AAOR ===
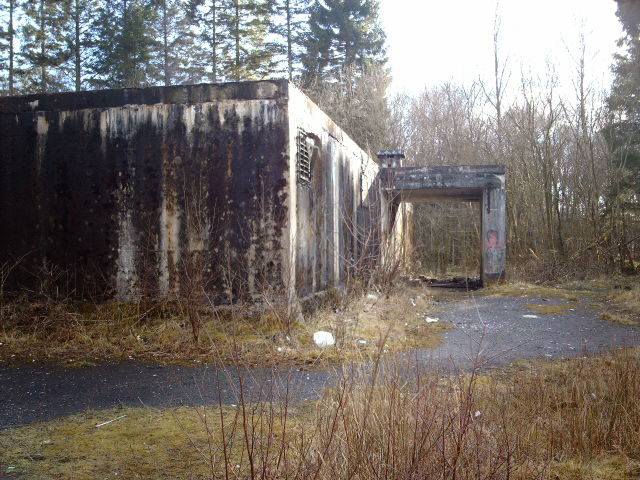
Inverkip AAOR, 2006

At the top of Langhouse Road a building reminiscent of the Cold War can be found in Square Wood. Known locally as 'the radar station', formally known as Inverkip Anti-Aircraft Operations Room (AAOR), the building (which is mostly underground) served "3 Group 77 Brigade, the Clyde Anchorage gun defended area (GDA)".

The site was the original base of HMS Dalriada, which operated there from 1965 to 1982.

Conversion to residential use commenced in early 2011, but by August 2017 little visible progress had been made outside, and the inside was several feet deep with water.

=== Inverkip Primary School ===
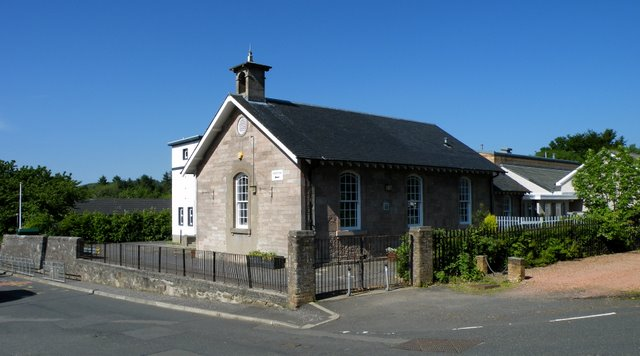
Inverkip Primary School

The village primary school is located on Station Road, in the heart of the old village. It has around 290 pupils (including a pre-5 nursery) with capacity for 320.

The original 1836 two roomed school building still exists and is in daily use.

Three extensions have been added since the mid-20th century.

=== Inverkip Community Hub ===
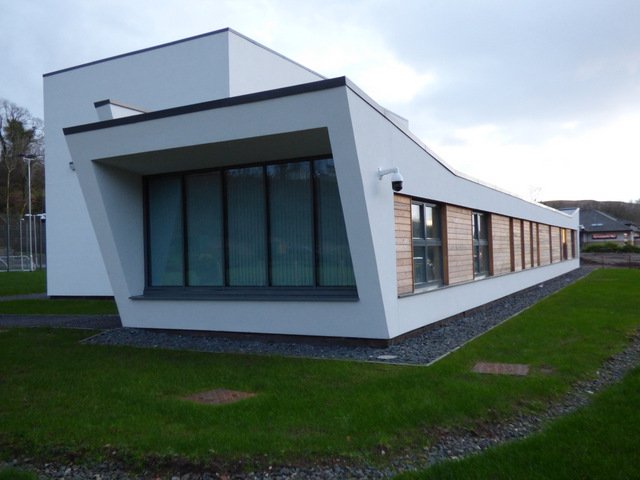
Inverkip Community Hub

A small community centre named 'Inverkip Community Hub' was opened in the village in early 2017. It is located at Kip Park, by the A78 Main Road at the north end of the village, between Bridgend and the village proper. It was built on the site of the grass football pitch.

The centre includes a public library, meeting rooms, a main hall which can serve as a theatre and kitchen, and catering facilities for up to 100 people.

There is also a floodlit all weather sports pitch at the hub.

This is the first public community centre in the village. The previous private community centre was demolished to make way for the Kip Park retail development.

=== Old church graveyard ===
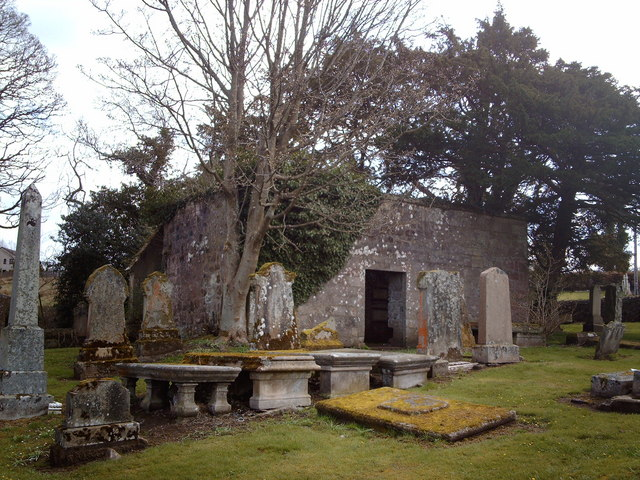
Shaw-Stewart Mausoleum

The old section of the graveyard on Millhouse Road at Langhouse Road contains the tomb of the chemist Dr. James "Paraffin" Young who was nicknamed 'Paraffin' because of his pioneering work in oil technology. He lived at the nearby Kelly Estate (above Wemyss Bay).

The graveyard also contains the derelict mausoleum of the Shaw Stewart baronets of Ardgowan. It was last used in the 1970s and is in a poor state of repair.

The mausoleum stands on the site of the original 1188 church (known as Auld Kirk) and incorporates parts of the original church.

=== Inverkip War Memorial ===
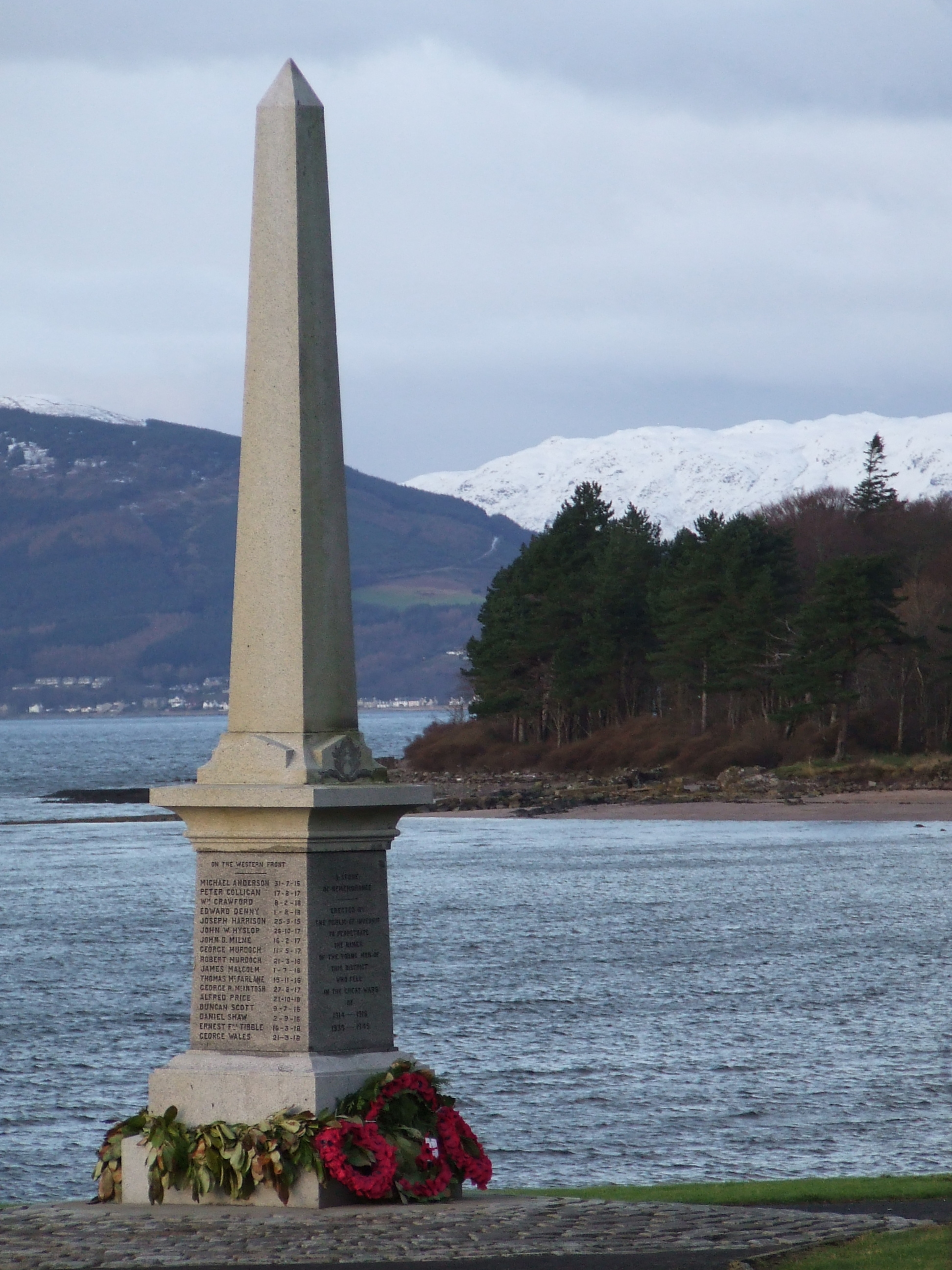
Inverkip War Memorial

The white granite simple obelisk memorial was erected by the people of the village in 1920 to commemorate the young local men who died in the First World War.

The memorial was updated to add the names of local men who died in the Second World War.

It is located at the west end of the village, beside the A78 Greenock to Largs road in what is now a small area of parkland and lay-by which was created when the road was re-aligned in the early 1970s.

A WWI centenary memorial bench was added nearby around 2015.

Inverkip War Memorial photo gallery

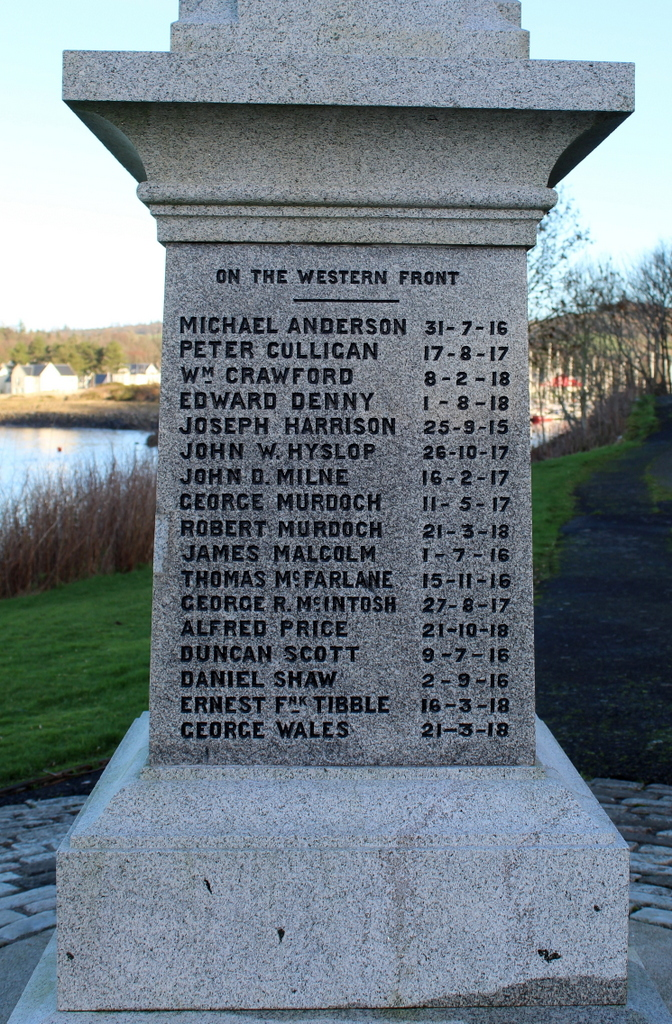
Inscription on one of the four sides of the memorial

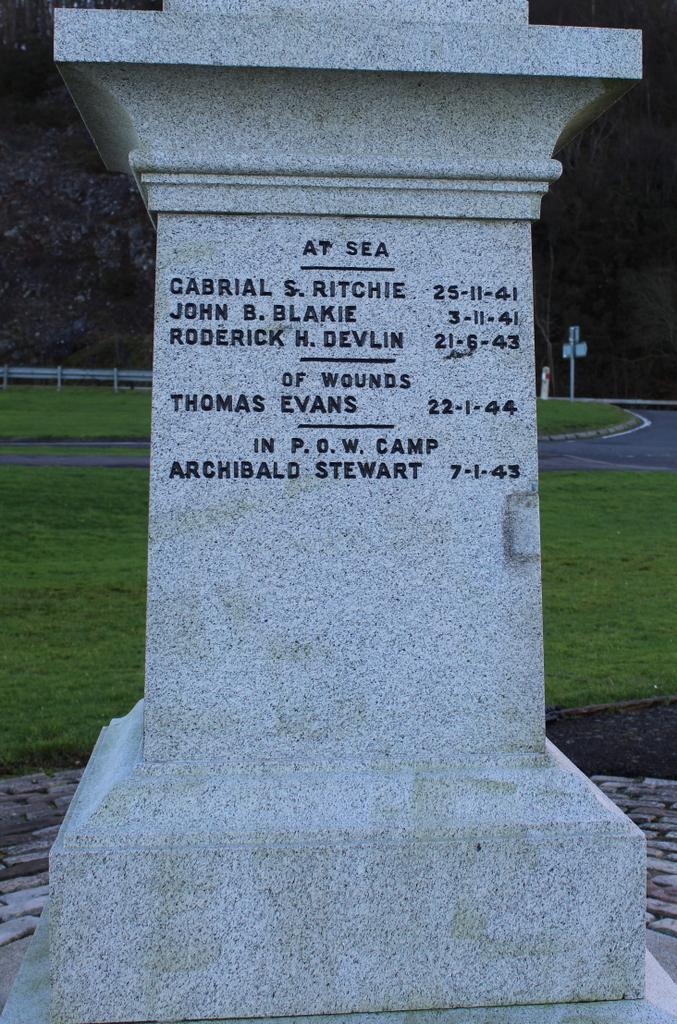
Inscription on one of the four sides of the memorial

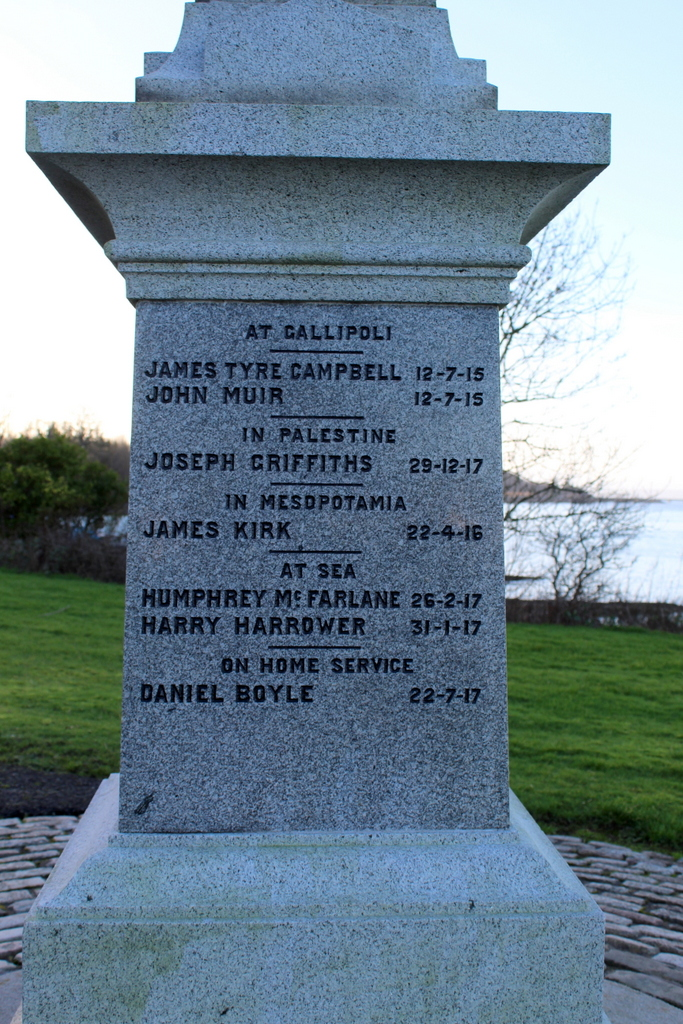
Inscription on one of the four sides of the memorial

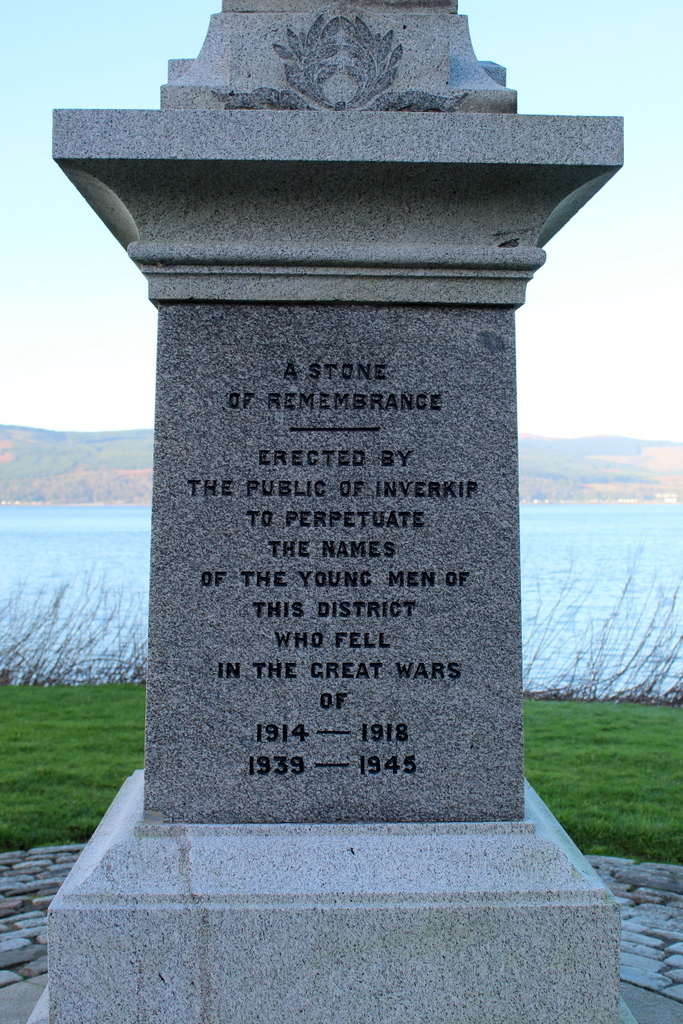
Inscription on one of the four sides of the memorial

=== Inverkip Yacht Club ===
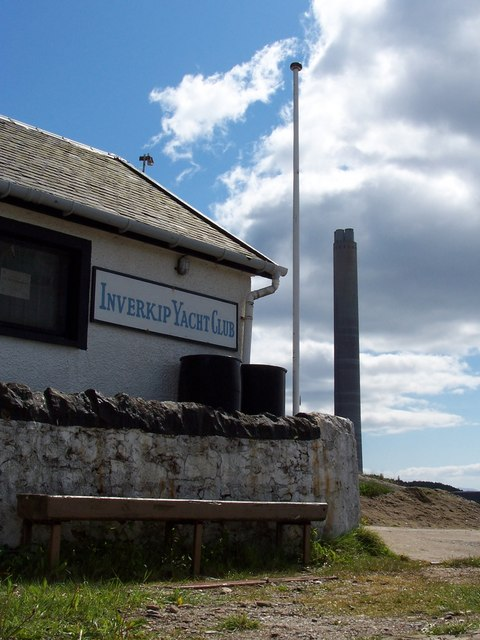
Inverkip Yacht Club

The club was formed in 1880 and is one of the oldest in Scotland. The current boathouse stands on an elevated position near the war memorial, on land that was donated to the club by Sir Michael Robert Shaw Stewart of Ardgowan for that purpose.

Inverkip Yacht Club photo gallery

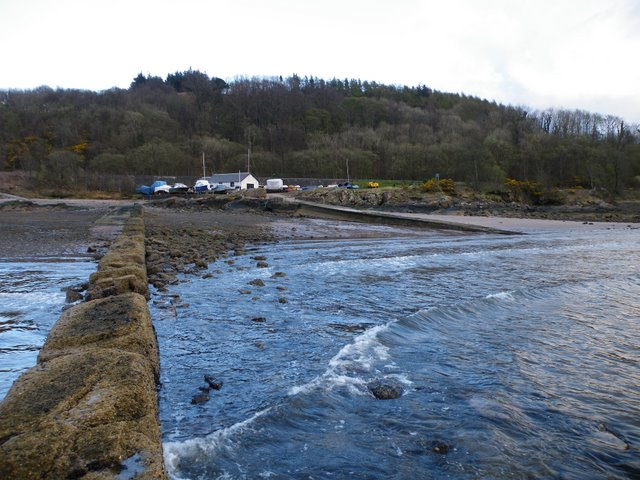
A view from the end of the old jetty

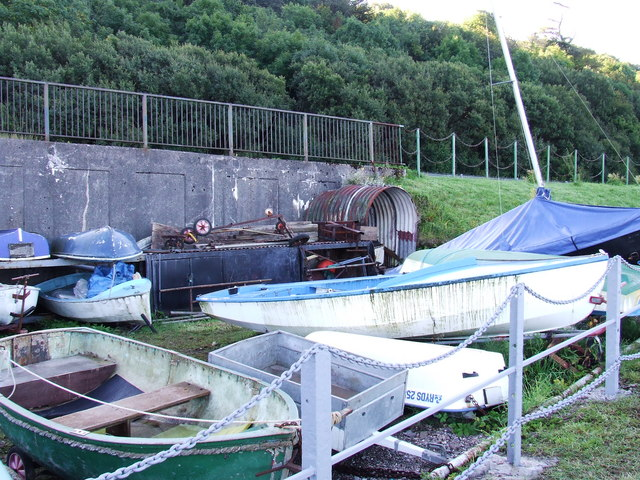
The boatyard

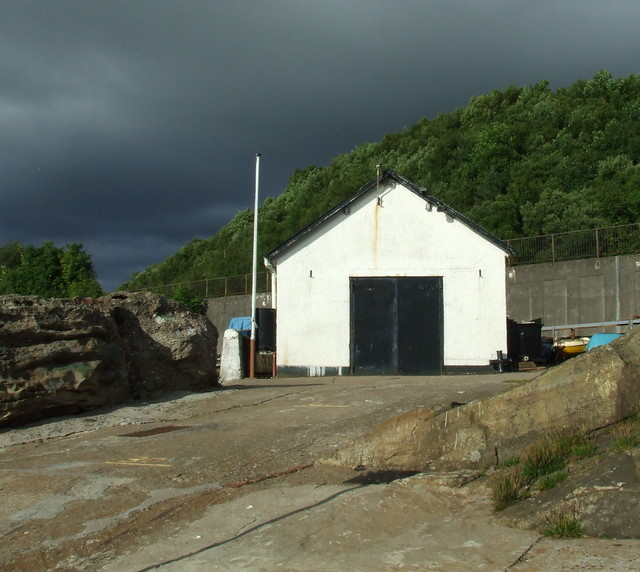
Shelter from the storm

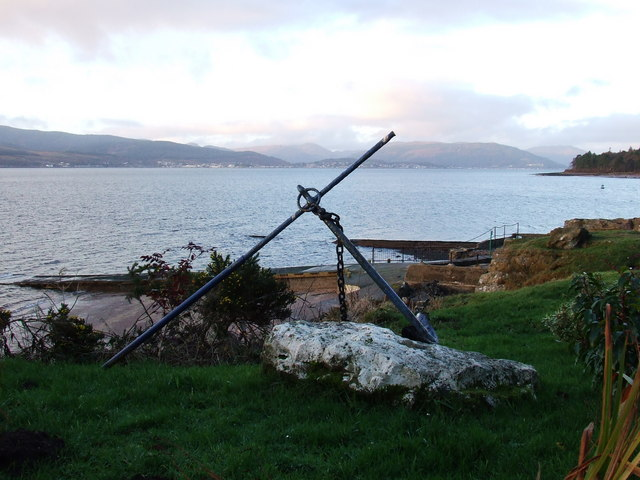
Ornamental anchor at the boatyard

=== Local businesses ===
Inverkip is mainly a residential village and does not possess a large number of businesses. A sub post office was located within the former pharmacy in what was (until 2010) the general store on Main Street. That building was vacated when the pharmacy moved along Main Street to Kip Park and the village has been without a Post Office since that time (early 2020). Kip Park is a retail and business block, located at the north end of Main Street. Businesses operating there include a fish & chip shop, supermarket, hairdresser, nursery and a pharmacy with a coffee shop. A dentists surgery is located on Main Street at the junction with Station Road.

Across the A78 road at Kip Marina, several yachting related businesses can be found in addition to the marina itself. A bar/restaurant, cafe and gallery are also located there.

=== Accommodation ===
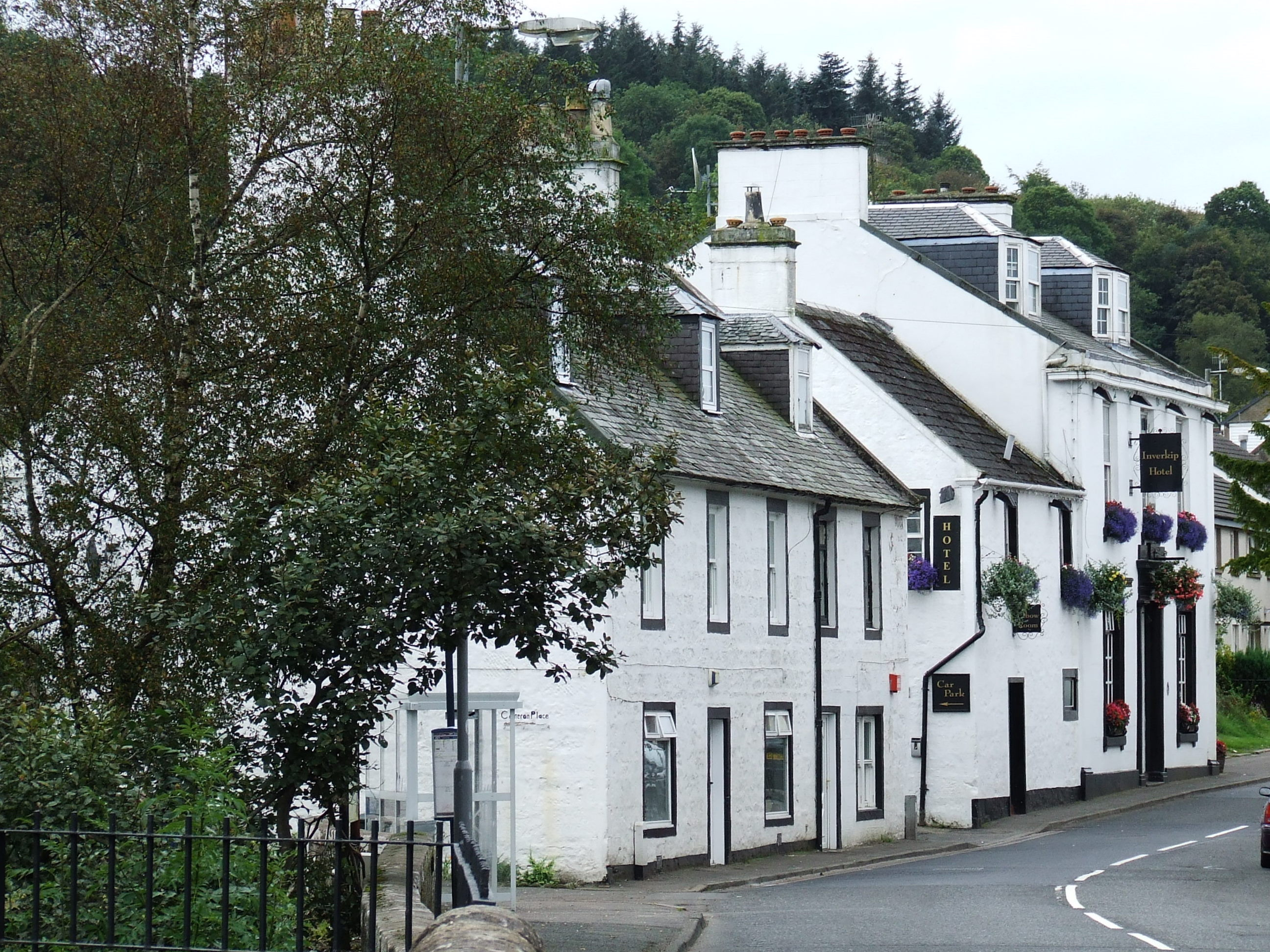
Inverkip Hotel

Inverkip Hotel is a traditional Scottish village hotel, with a bar and restaurant. A former coaching inn dating back over 300 years, it is located on Main Street in the heart of the old village.

There are also at least two B&B establishments in the village.

=== Nearby places of interest ===
Inverkip is fairly central for other attractions, including Greenock town centre and the holiday town of Largs, which is 9 miles down the Clyde coast. Frequent car and passenger ferry services to the Isle of Cumbrae, Isle of Bute and the Cowal peninsula operate from Largs, Wemyss Bay and Gourock respectively.

== Notable people ==
- Alexander Robertson (1851–1937), shipwright

== Notable Events ==
- The Murder of Margaret Fleming by Inverkip residents Edward Cairney and Avril Jones who were convicted in 2019, twenty years after the last confirmed sighting of Margaret Fleming.

== Gallery ==
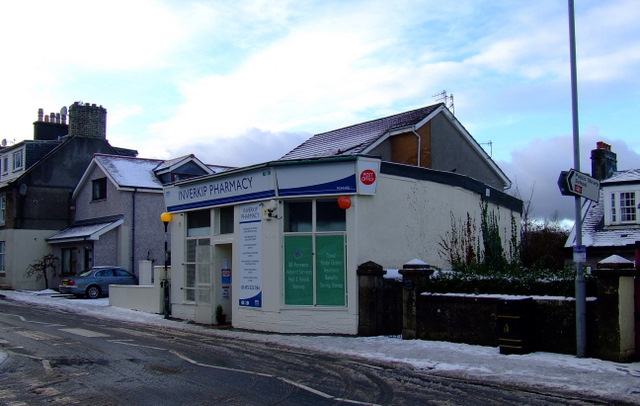
Former Inverkip Pharmacy and Post Office (closed 2021)

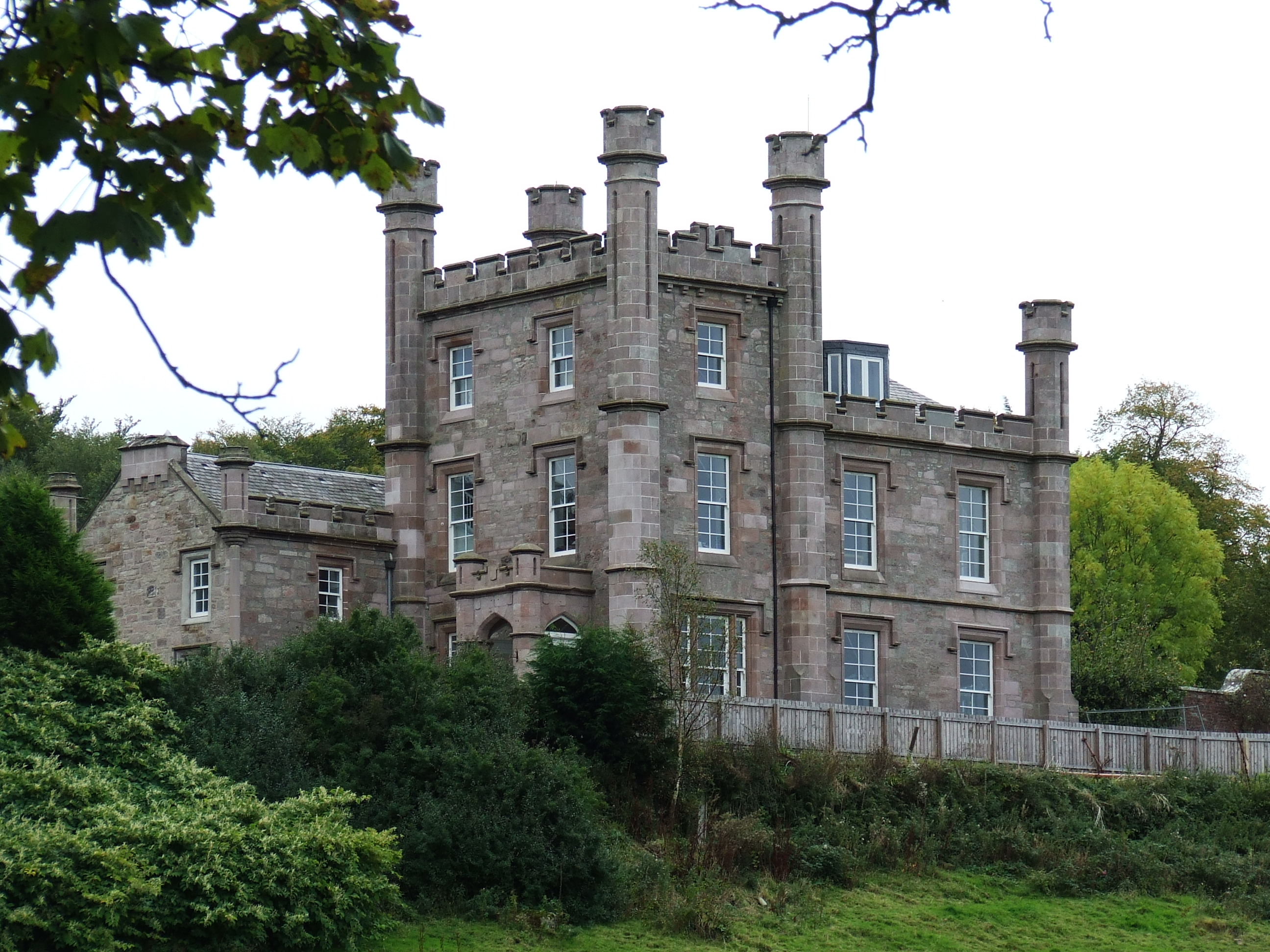
Langhouse

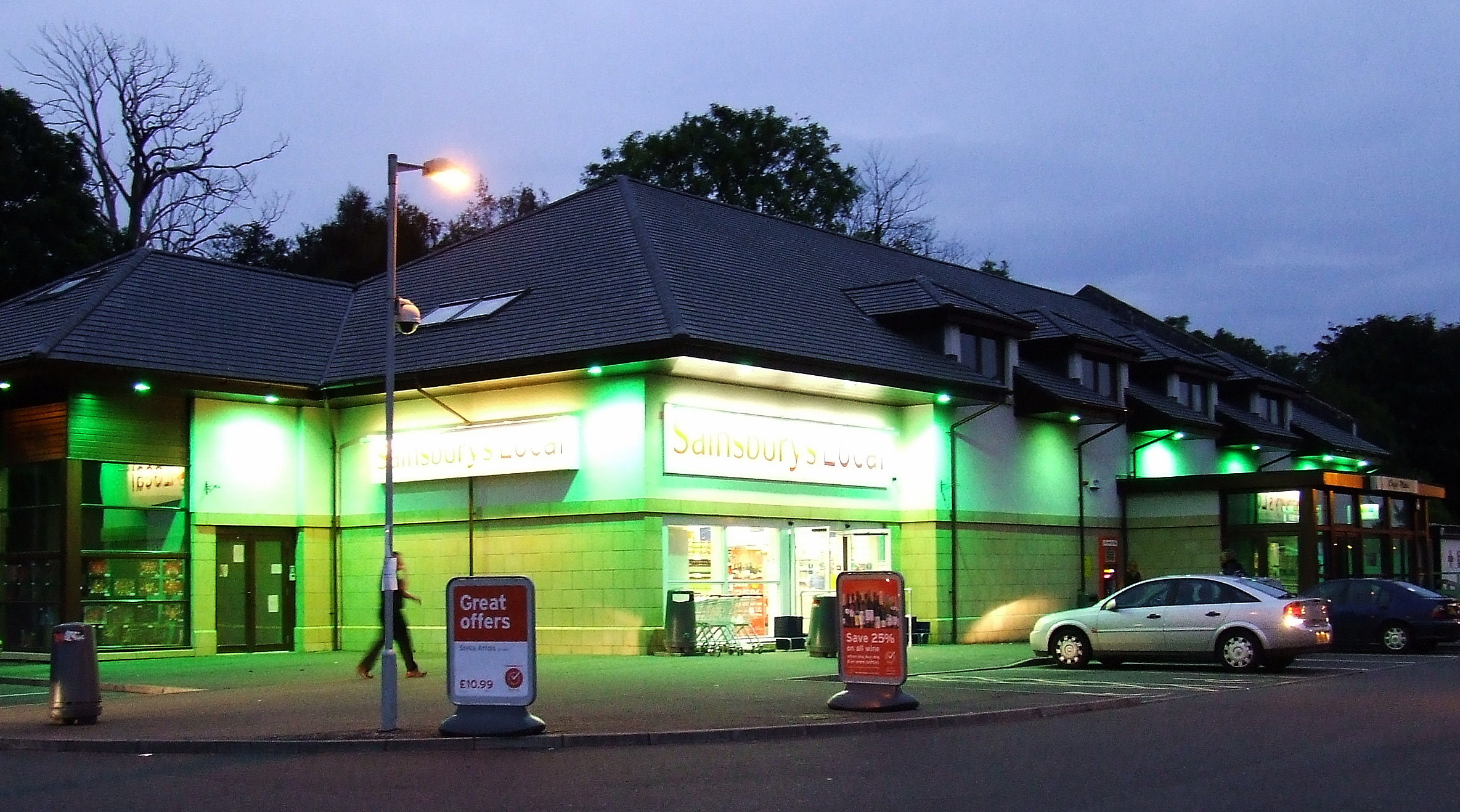
Kip Park

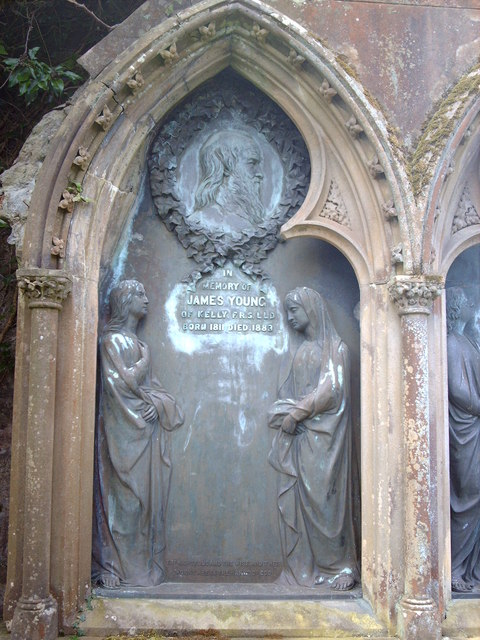
"Paraffin" Young gravestone

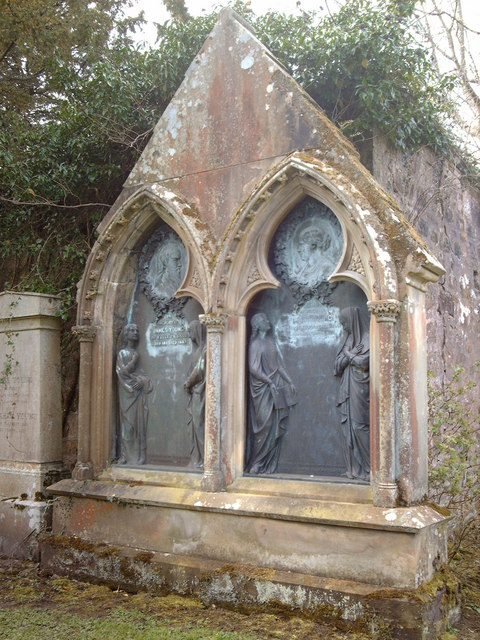
"Paraffin" Young and wife gravestone

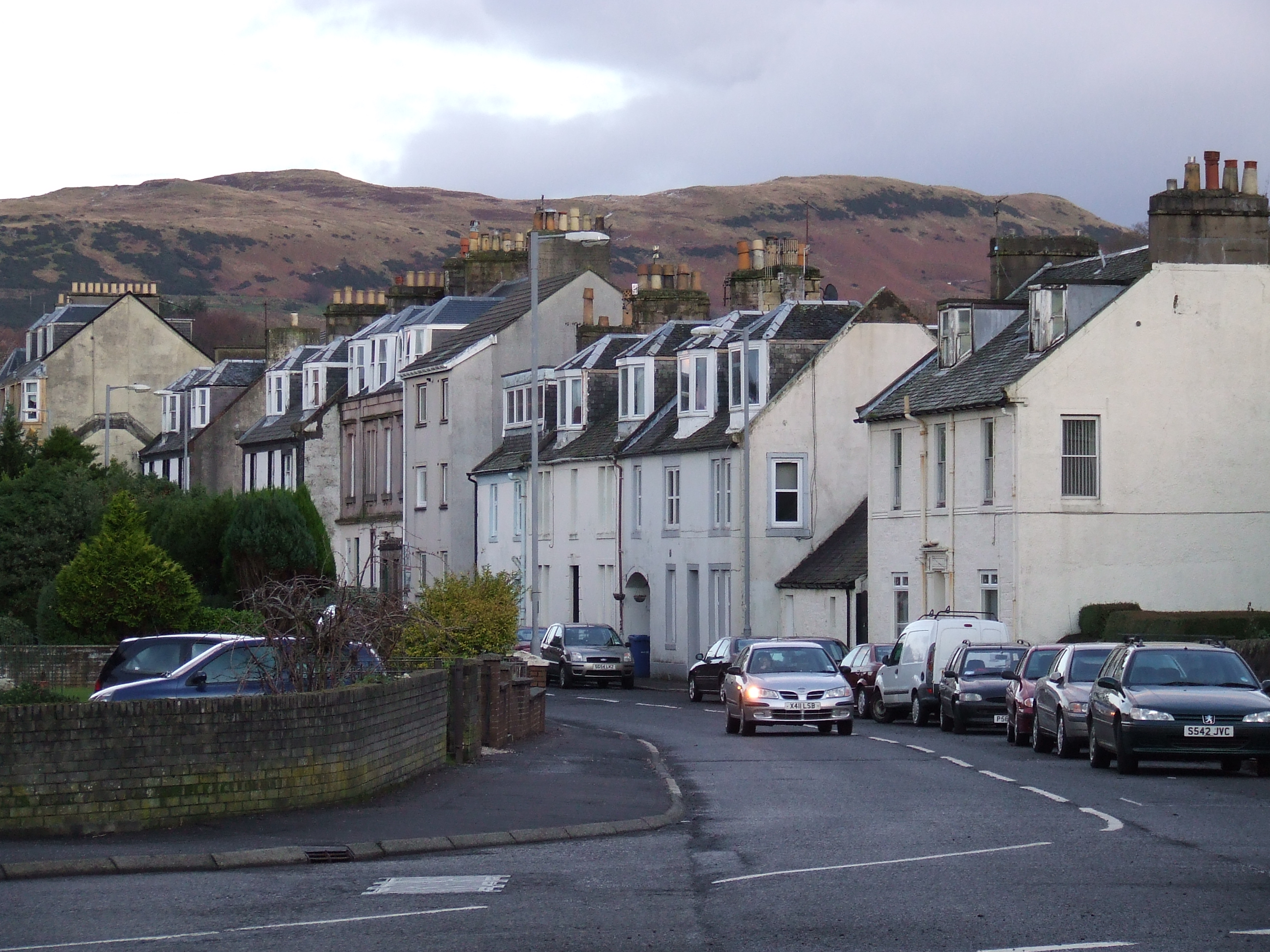
Main Street, Inverkip

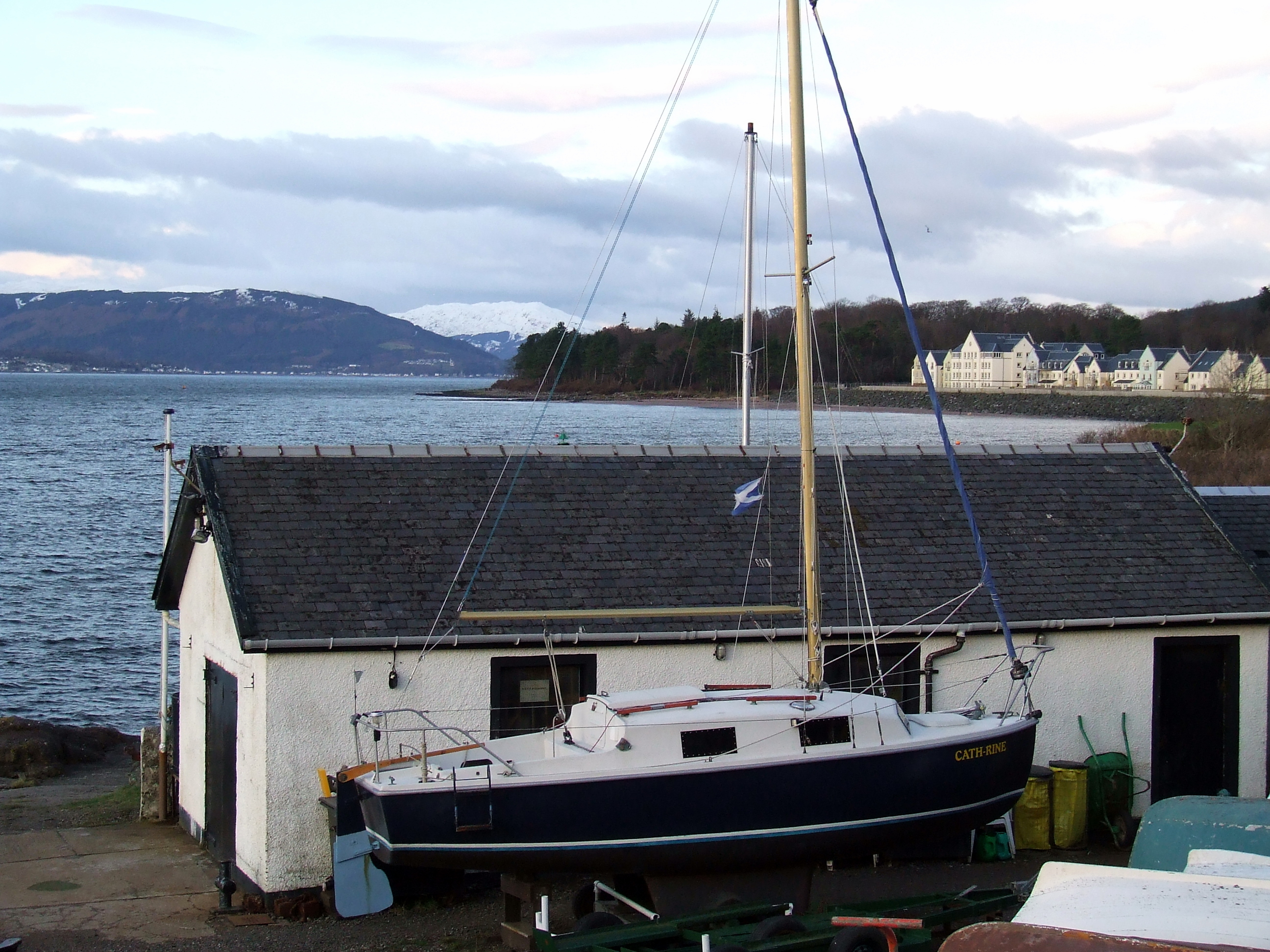
Inverkip Yacht Club

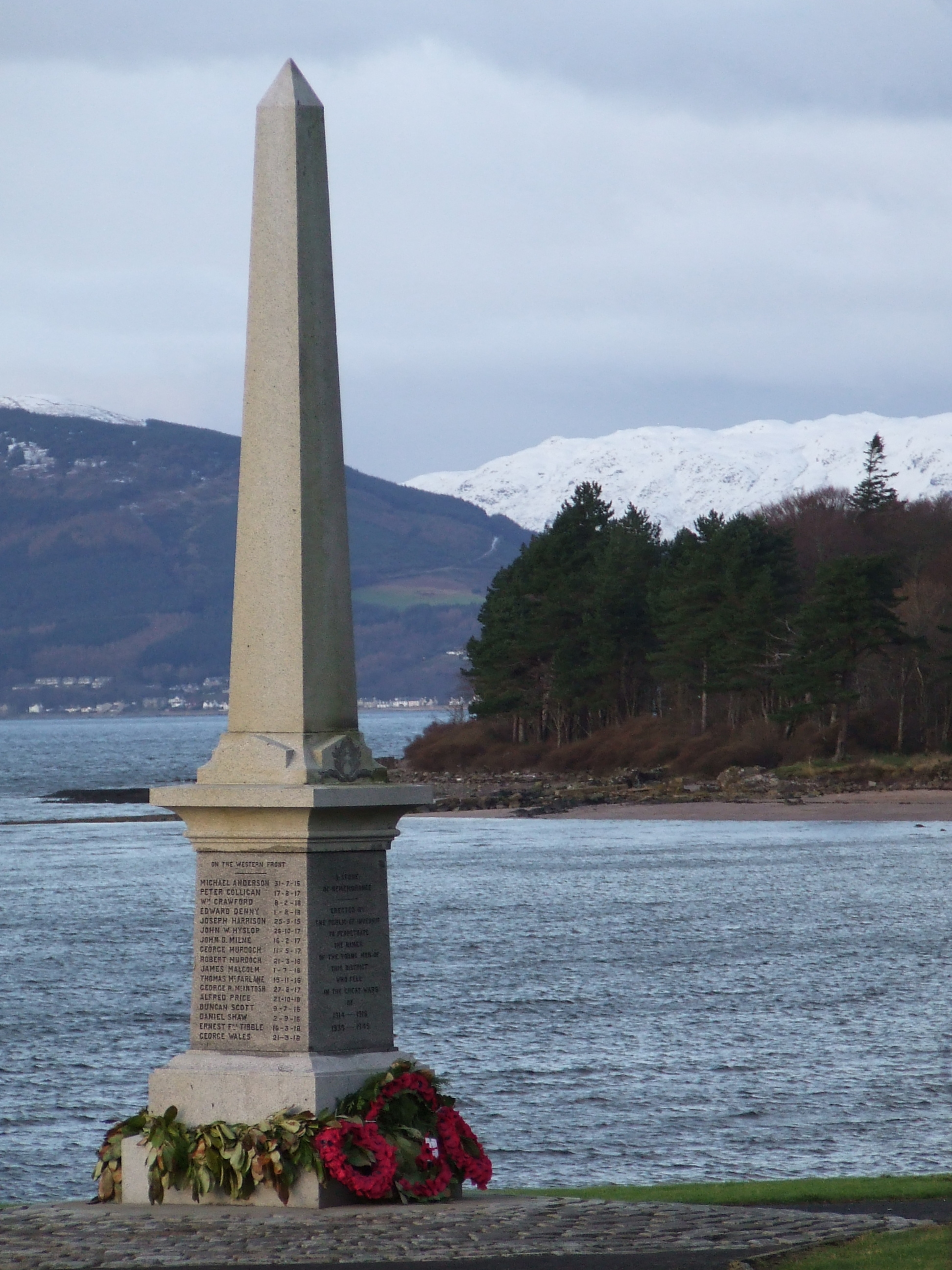
Inverkip War Memorial

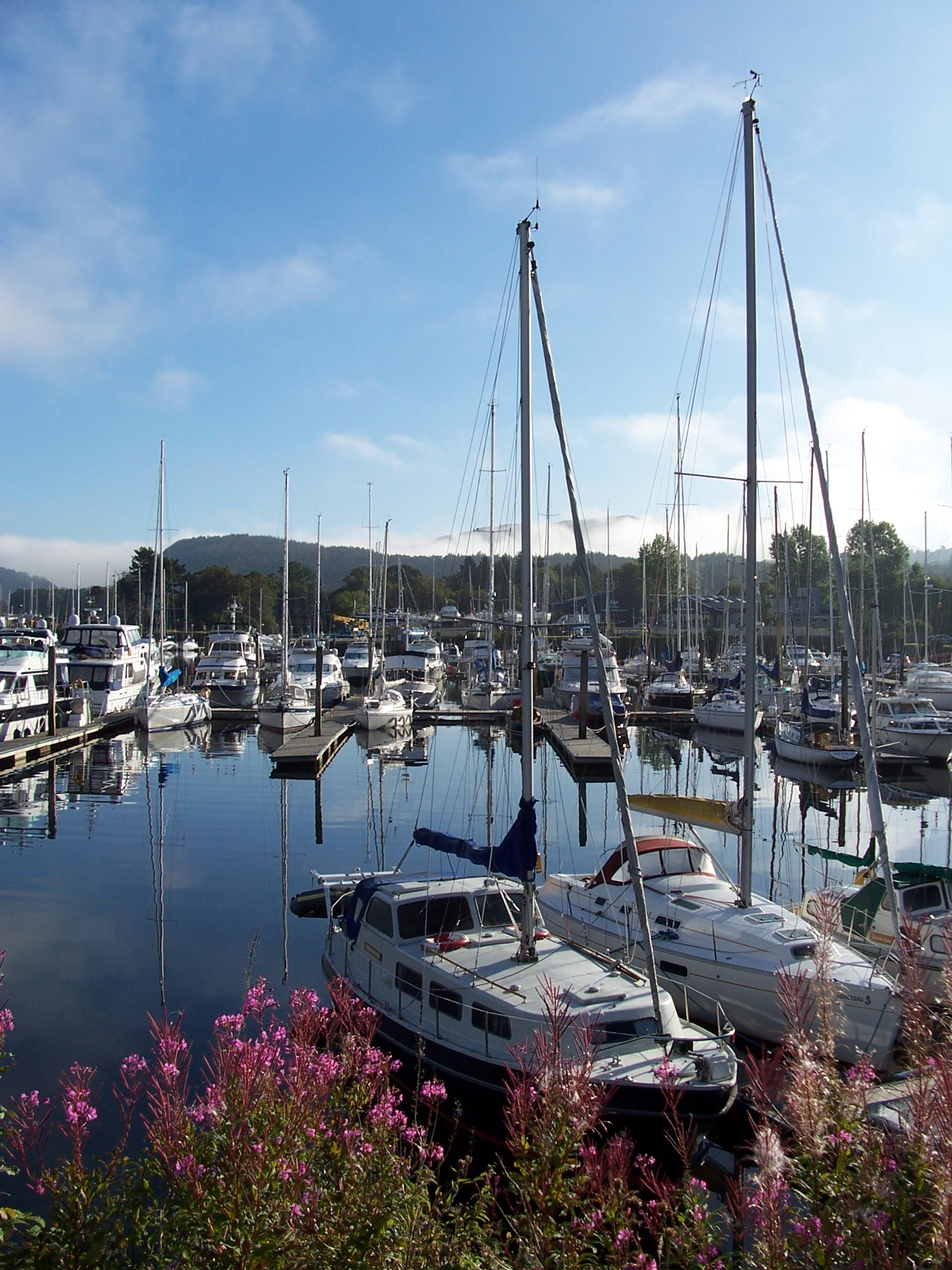
Kip Marina

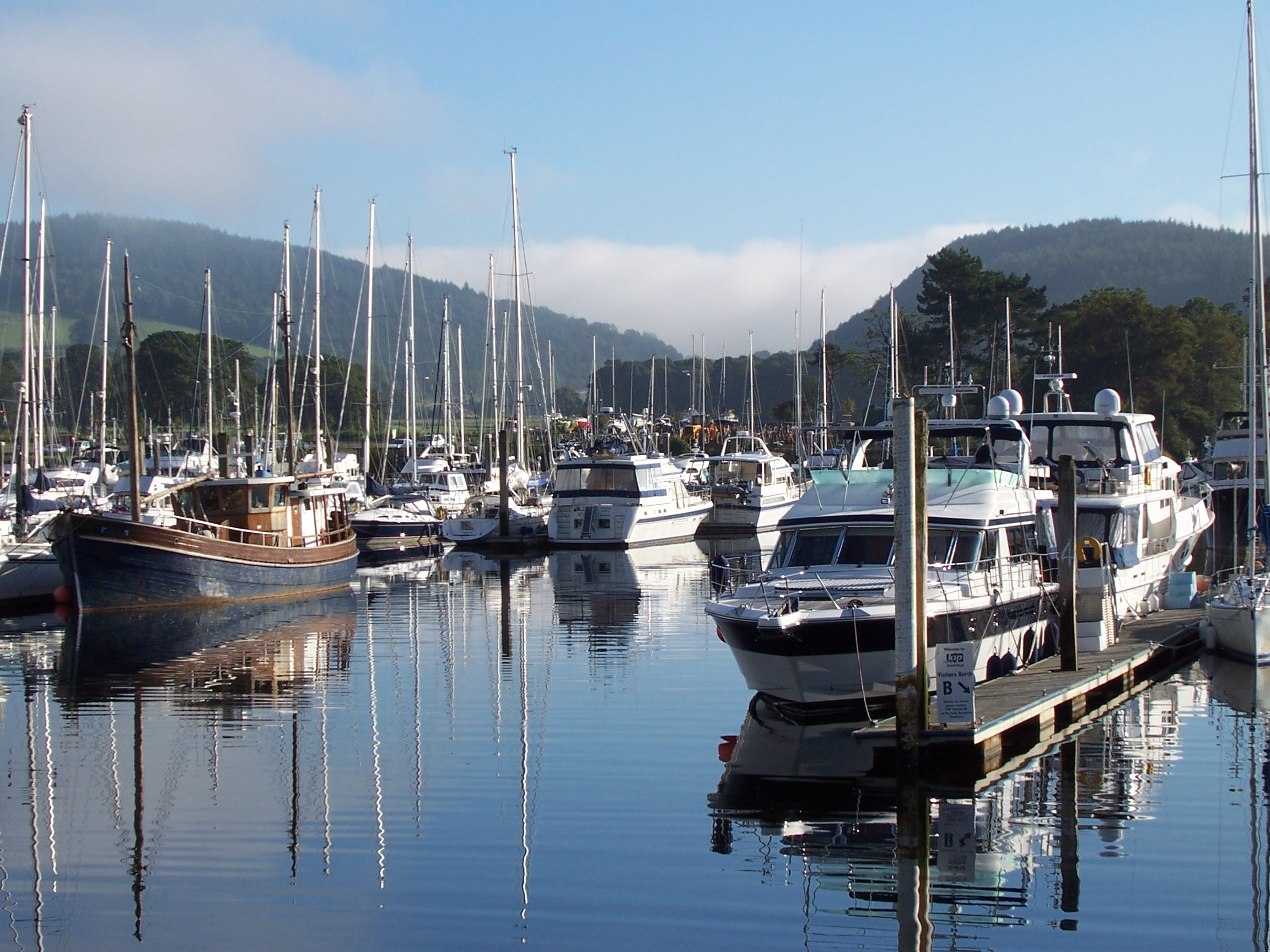
Kip Marina

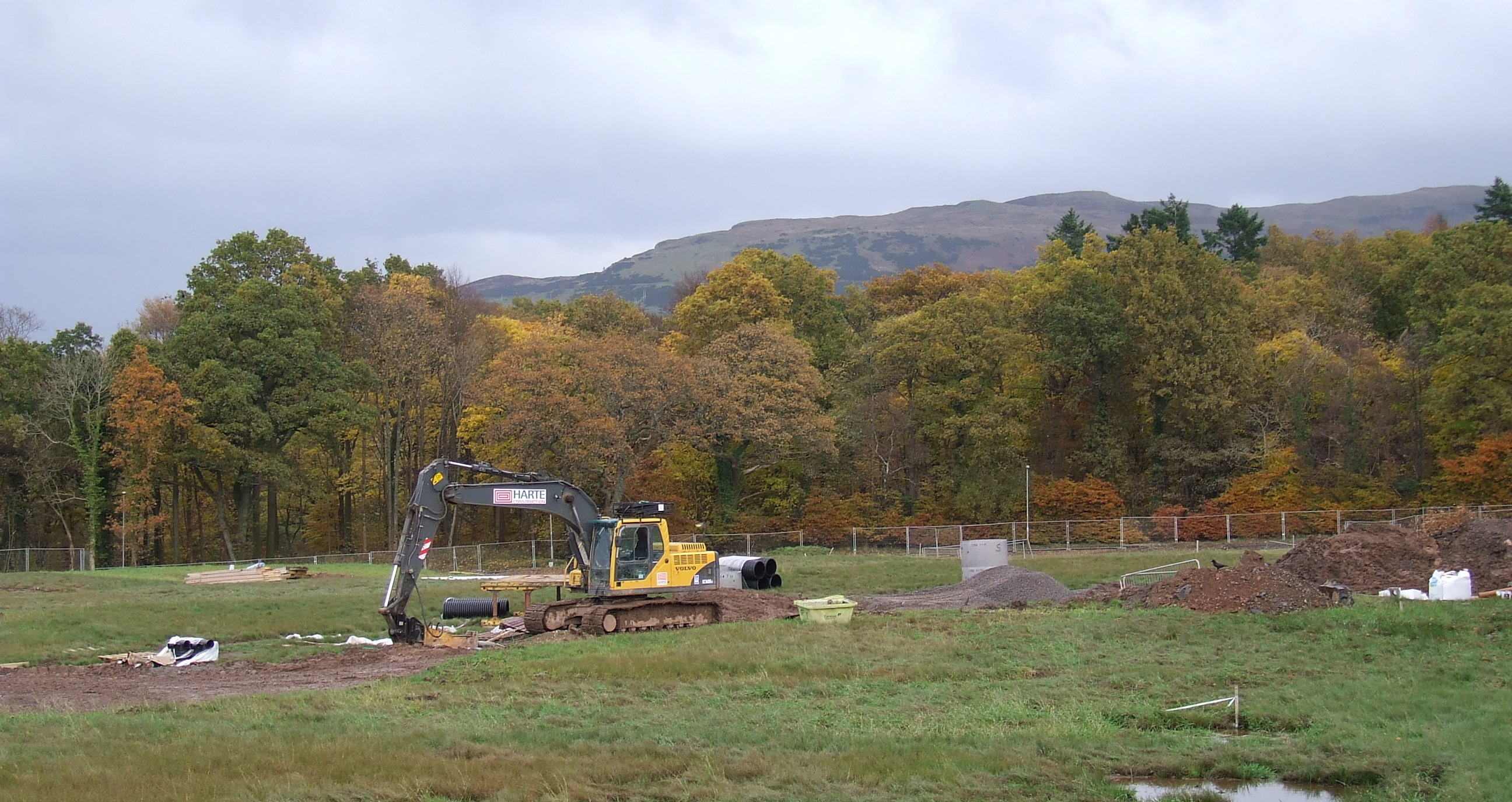
Inverkip expands south of the railway line

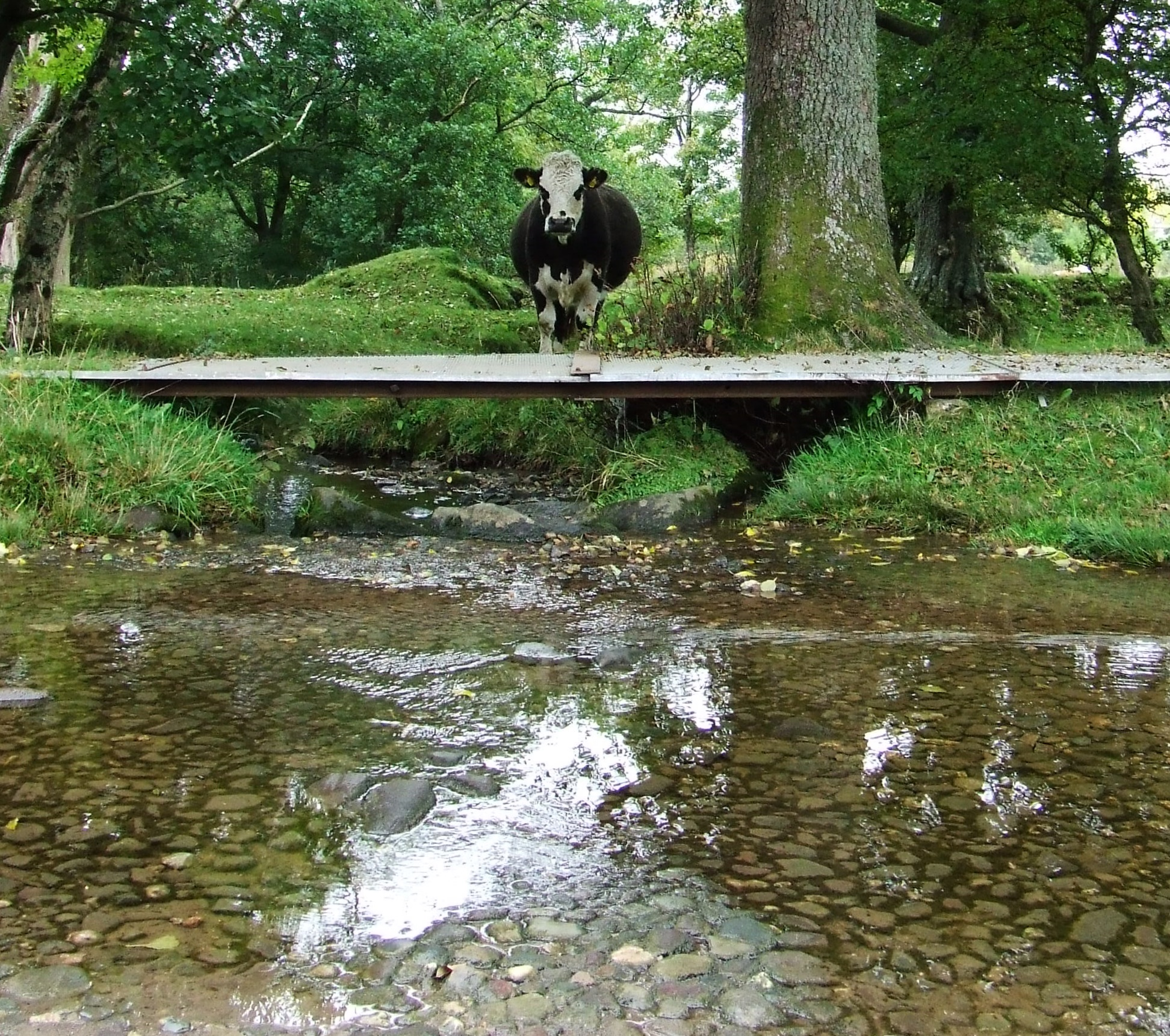
Bettyburn Ford on the road to Everton

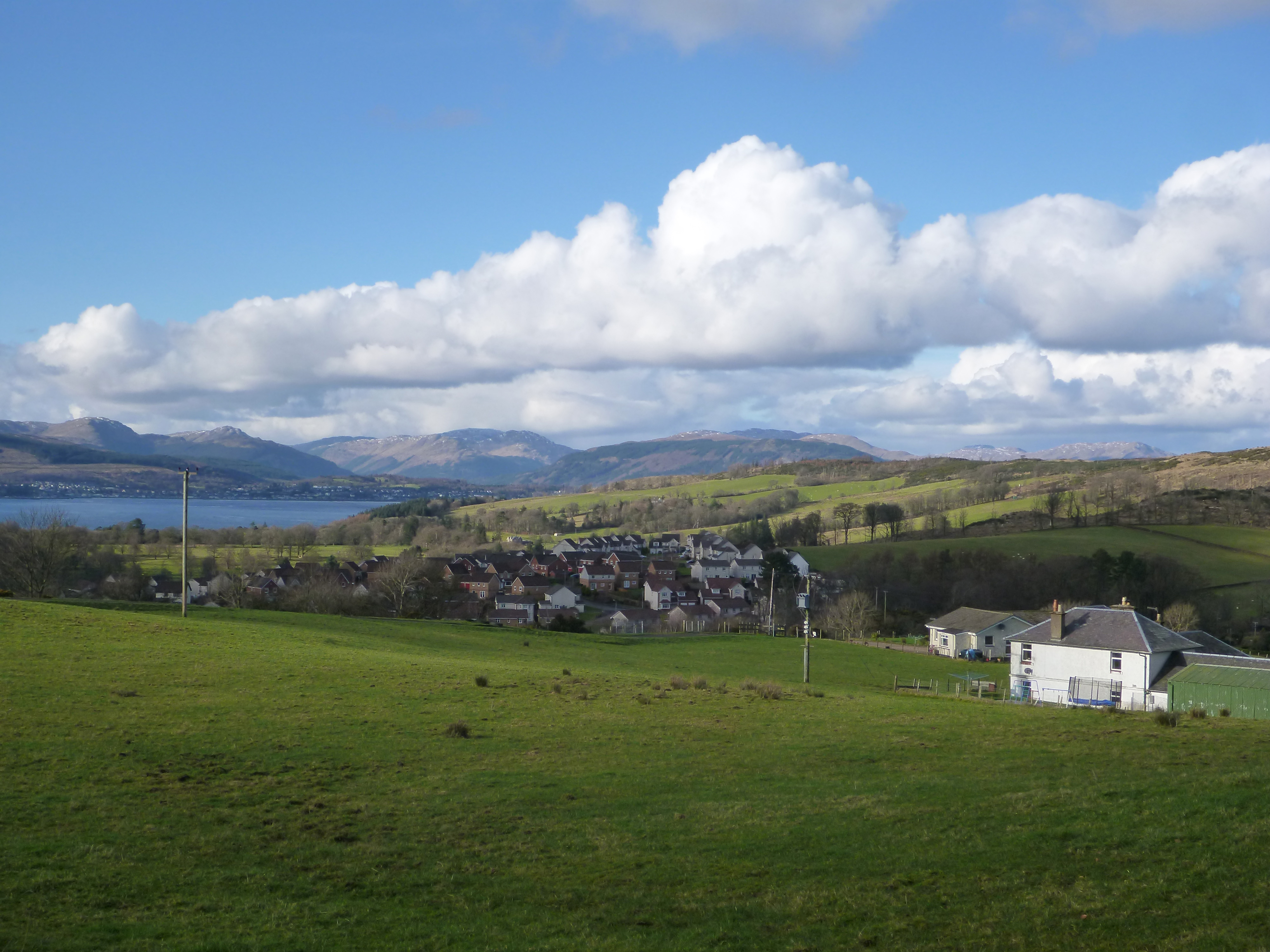
Millhouse Road, seen from Langhill Farm

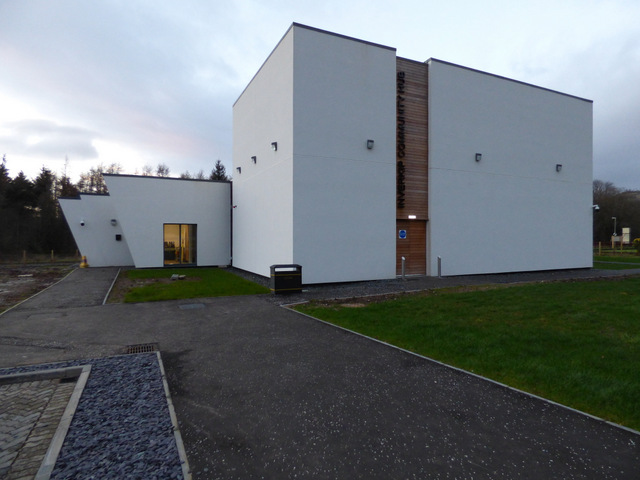
The main entrance to the community centre

== See also ==
- Inverkip Castle
