= Kip Water, Inverclyde =

Kip Water
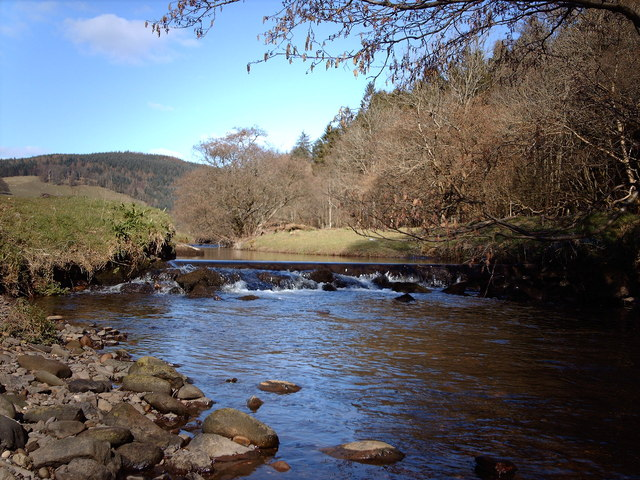
- Kip Water at Bridgend

Location
- Country: Scotland
- Counties: Inverclyde

Physical characteristics
- Source: Compensation Reservoir in Inverclyde
  - location: Cornalees Bridge, Inverclyde, Scotland, United Kingdom
  - coordinates: 55°54′34.0″N 4°48′21.0″W
  - elevation: 178 m (584 ft)
- Mouth
  - location: Inverkip, Inverclyde, Scotland, United Kingdom
  - coordinates: 55°54′29.8″N 4°52′37.7″W
- Length: 7 km (4.3 mi)
- Discharge
  - location: Firth of Clyde at Kip Marina

Kip Water, also known as the River Kip, is a short river in Inverclyde, Scotland which gives the village of Inverkip its name (Inverkip = mouth of the River Kip). It originates at Cornalees in the hills between Inverkip and Greenock and runs through Shielhill Glen, Dunrod Glen and the Kip Valley before entering the Firth of Clyde at Kip Marina in Inverkip.

== History ==
John Ainslie's 1800 map of the County of Renfrew shows the upper reaches of the River named "Shaws Burn" and the lower reaches at Ardgowan Policies named "Ardgowan Water". This was before the construction of Shaws Water Scheme, which opened in 1827 and modified the source of the river.

John Thomson's 1832 map also shows the upper reaches named "Shaws Burn", with the lower reaches named "Ardgowan or Kipp Water" (note the double 'p'). It is not clear when the name "Kip Water" was formally adopted for the entire length of the river.

=== Present Course ===
The present source of the river is Compensation Reservoir at Cornalees Bridge from where it drops steeply down Shielhill Glen to Millhouse, where it passes under the so-called 'Roman Bridge'. At this point the river enters Dunrod Glen where it runs around three sides of Idzholm Hill, here it is joined by the Spango Burn before entering the Kip Valley. The final stretch of the river from Bankfoot Farm to the Clyde is fairly flat and has been altered over the years by the addition of several small weirs.

=== Past Industry ===
The Aislie and Thomson maps referenced above show mills, including a waulkmill, at what is now Ardgowan Policies. Little or no trace of these mills survives today. It is also likely that there was a mill further upstream at Millhouse, based on the name of the house.

Three sandstone quarries were active at the top of Shielhill Glen in the late 19thC. These were served by a railway line which left the main line at Dunrod Farm. The line of the railway can still be clearly seen along most of the route.

=== Present Industry ===
There are workshops at Kip Marina.

=== Future Industry ===
In March 2017, plans were approved for the construction of a distillery at Bankfoot Farm by Ardgowan distillery. The planned distillery will take water from the river for process and cooling purposes. It will also take water from some adjacent springs. In April 2025 the distillery announced the opening ceremony, to be held on 20 June 2025.

== Bridges ==
There are several extant bridges across the river, the highest upstream being Cornalees Bridge which crosses the waterfall as the river exits Compensation Reservoir. This is a late 20thC concrete and steel construction which carries a minor road over the river. A few hundred metres downstream is a wooden footbridge which is part of the Cornalees nature trail.

There are traces of a bridge at the site of the disused sandstone quarries near the top of Shielhill Glen. Slightly downstream from this, the sandstone abutments and piers of a three span former railway bridge can be seen at Majeston Farm. This carried a short lived mineral line from Dunrod to the sandstone quarries in the late 19thC. A wooden farm bridge also crosses the river at this point.

Millhouse Road crosses the river on a stone arched bridge, from which can be seen the impressive single span of the 'Roman Bridge' in the private grounds of Millhouse. Just downstream from Millhouse is a sandstone and steel railway viaduct which carries the existing Glasgow to Wemyss Bay line. Parallel to this viaduct can be seen the piers of a second viaduct which was removed in the late 1960s.

A steel and timber bridge crosses at Bankfoot Farm. The remains of a further small bridge can be seen between Bankfoot and Bridgend. At Bridgend, there are two parallel bridges, one of which is disused, having been replaced when the A78 road was realigned in the early 1970s. Between this bridge and Kip Marina there is a dilapidated farm track bridge leading from Ardgowan Policies to Swallow Brae plantation. At Kip Marina there are two more parallel bridges, one of which is now a footpath only and which served Ardgowan House. This was replaced by a new concrete bridge in 2006 when Kip Marina Village was constructed. The final bridge is the pontoon bridge within Kip Marina.

== Bridges Gallery ==
Kip Water Bridges Photo Gallery - From Source To Sea

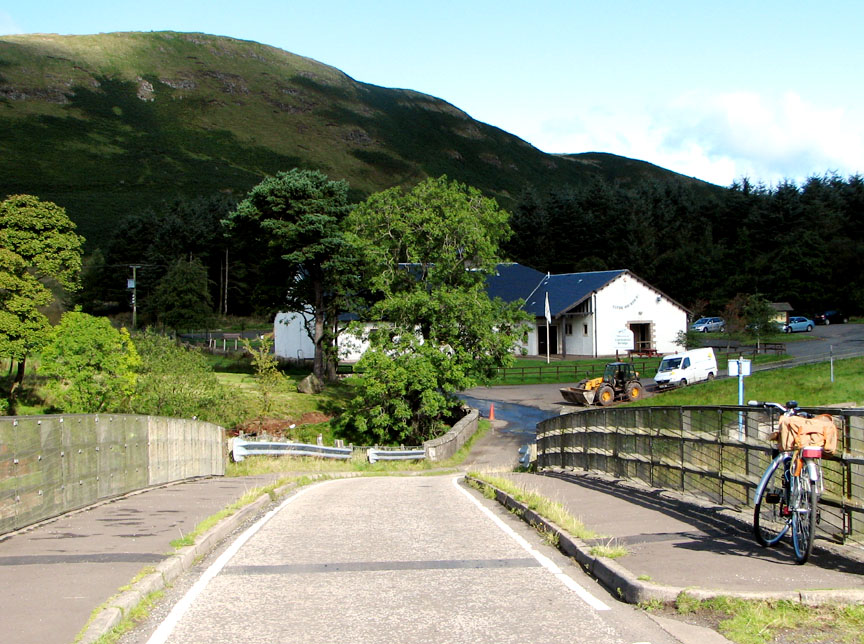
The furthest upstream bridge, at Compensation Reservoir

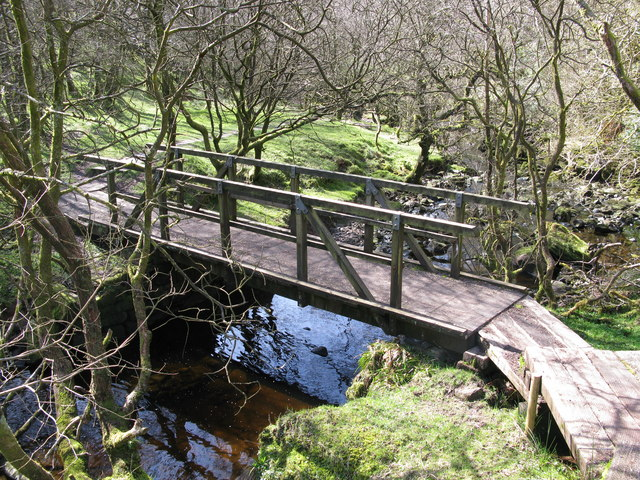
Nature trail footbridge, near the top of Shielhill Glen

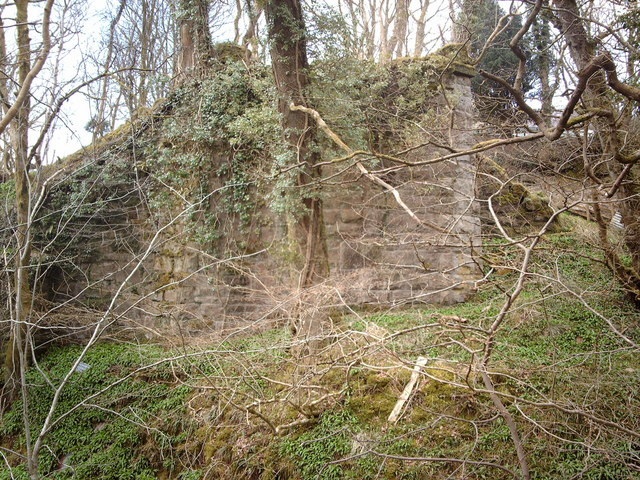
Remains of railway bridge in Shielhill Glen

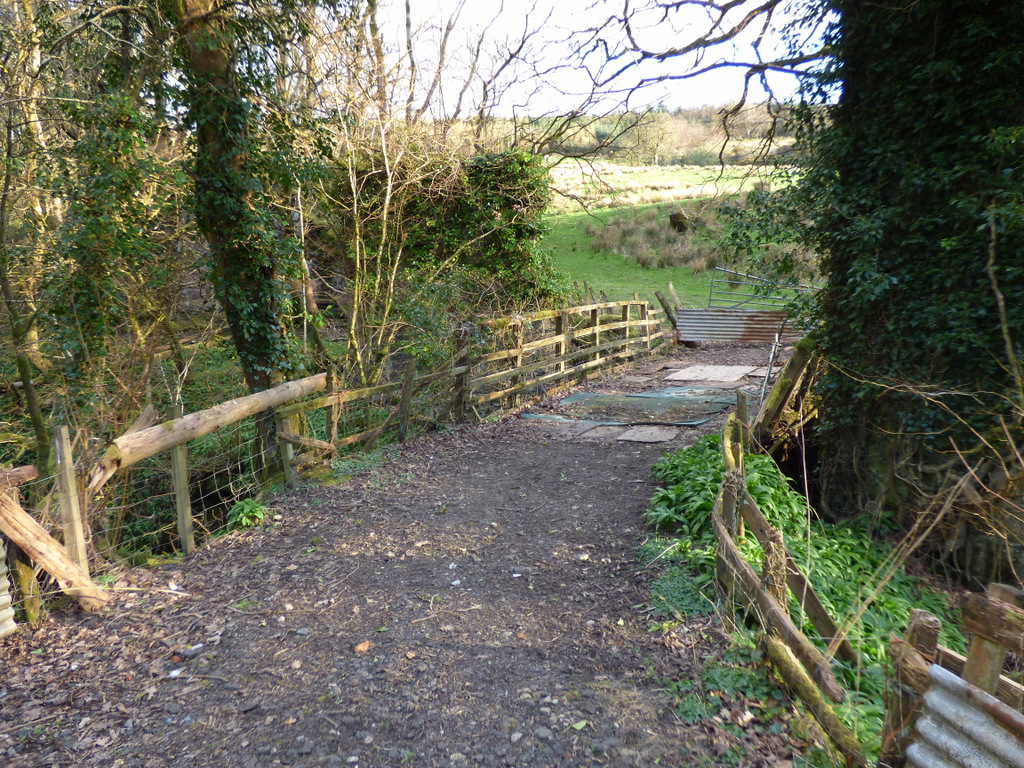
The dilapidated wooden bridge near Majeston Farm

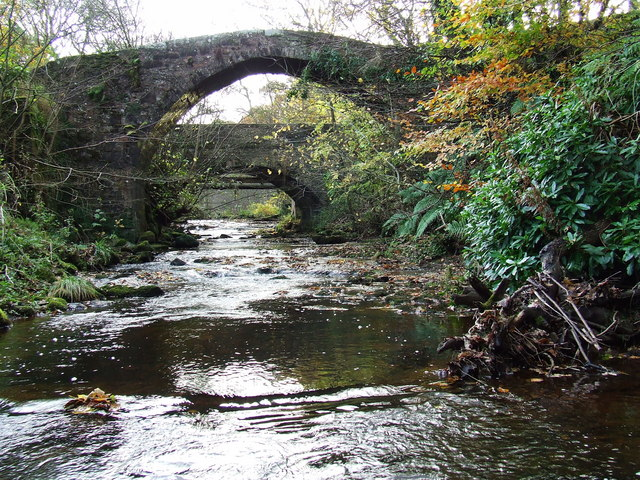
'Roman Bridge' and Millhouse Road bridge at Millhouse

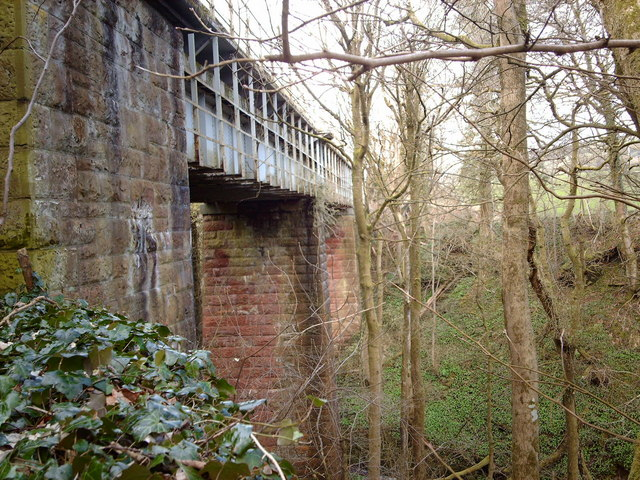
Dunrod Glen railway viaduct

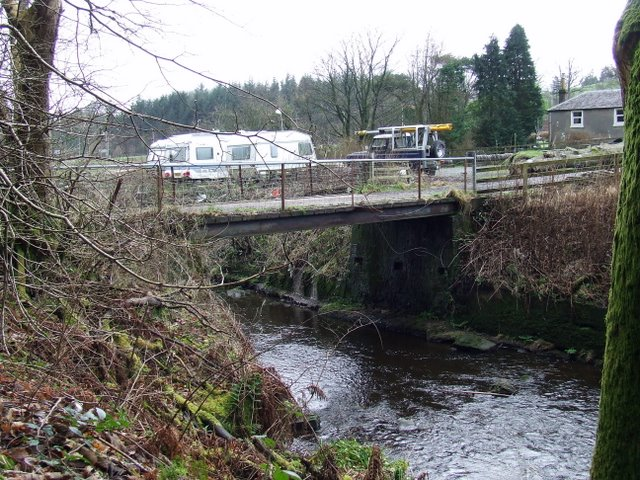
Bankfoot Farm bridge

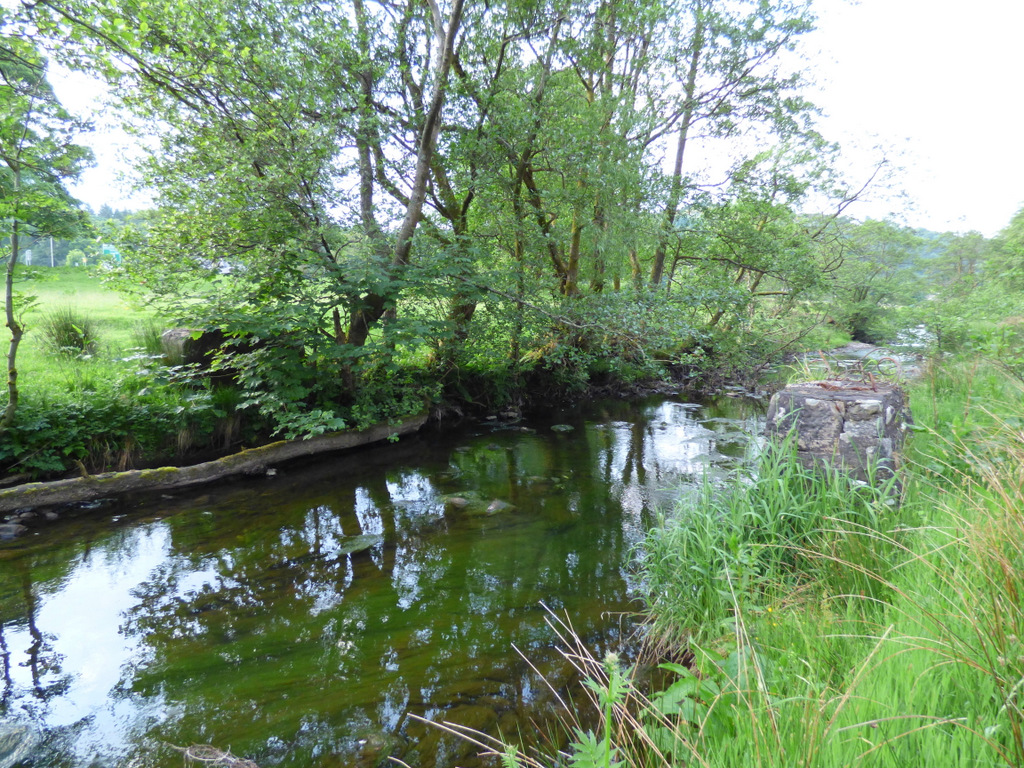
The stone abutments of a former bridge, one on each bank, downstream from Bankfoot.

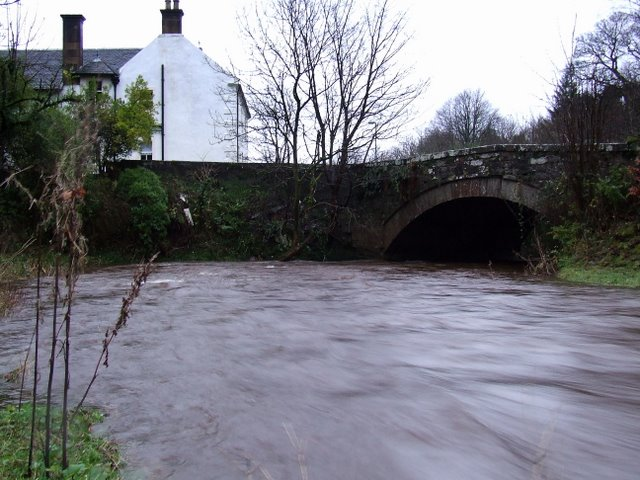
Disused bridge at Bridgend

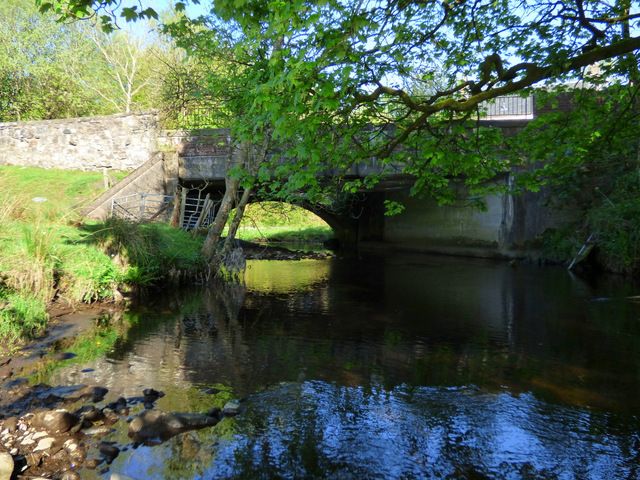
View upstream to the A78 road bridge at the north end of Inverkip

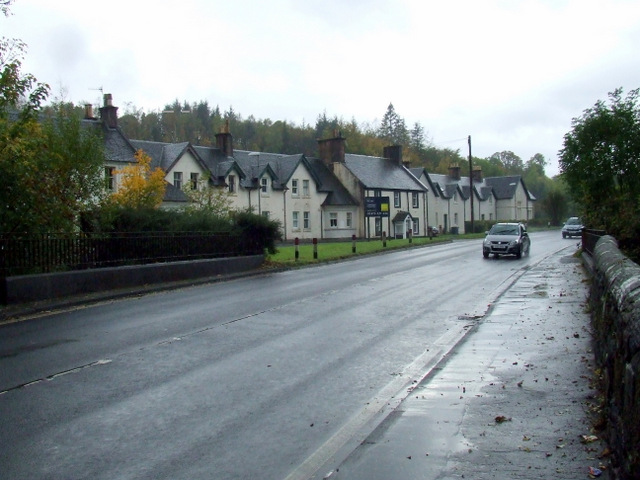
Bridgend Cottages and the A78 road bridge over Kip Water

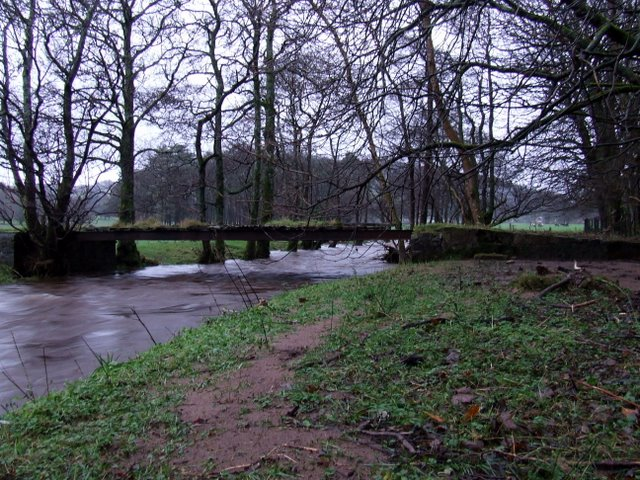
a disused bridge between Ardgowan Policies and Swallow Brae Plantation

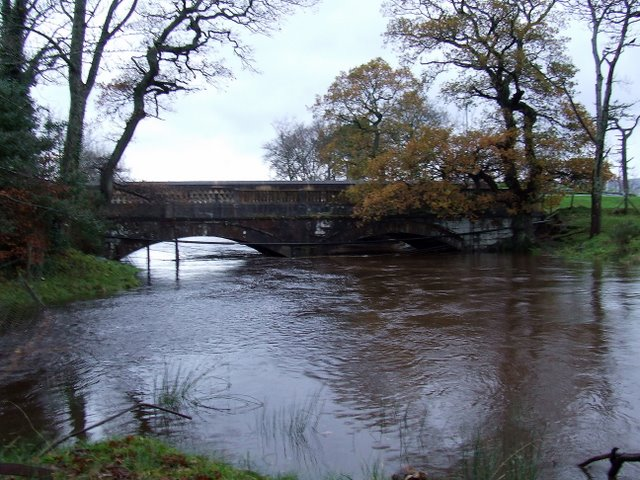
Old bridge to Ardgowan House, now a footbridge

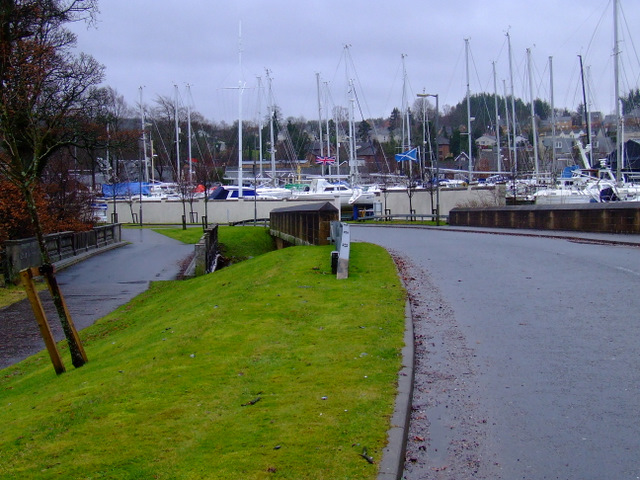
Old and new bridges at Kip Marina

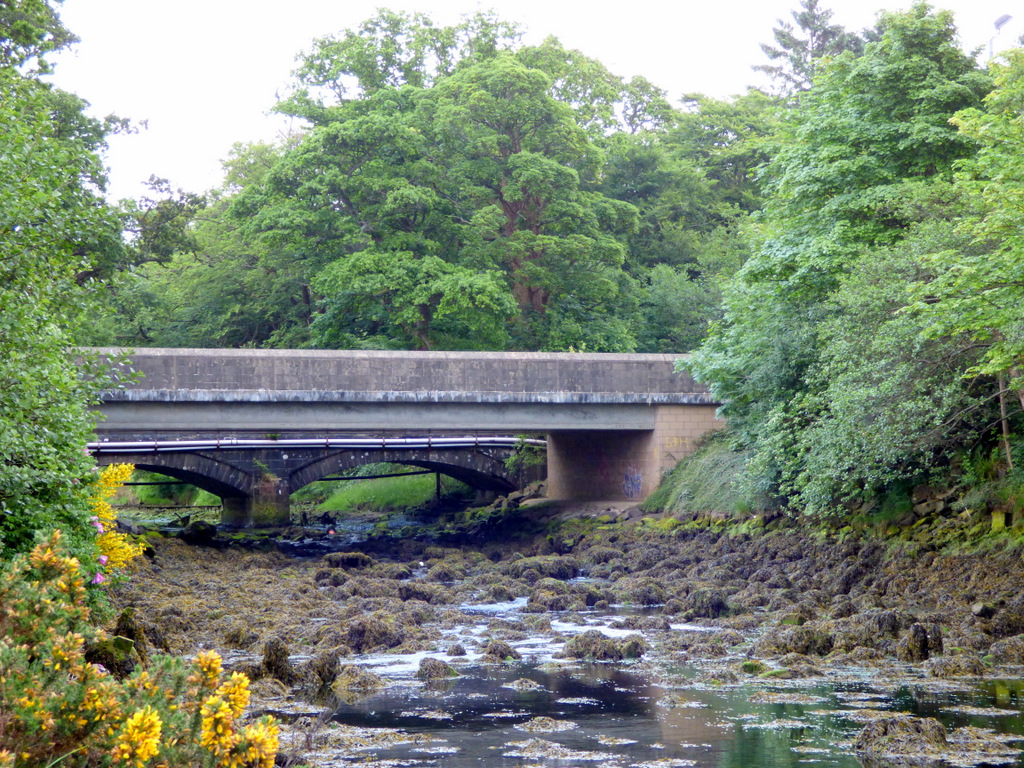
The river is tidal at this point. The old bridge to Ardgowan can also be seen.

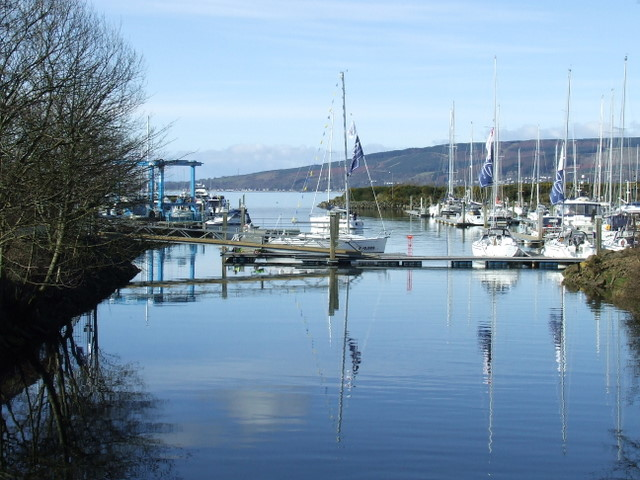
The furthest downstream bridge on the river

== Kip Marina ==
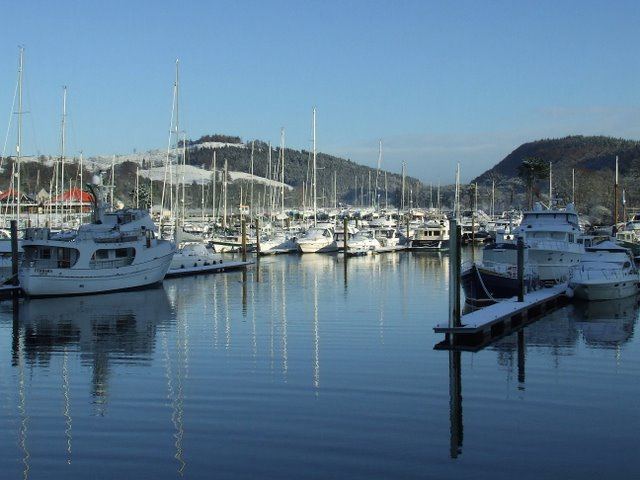
Kip marina

The marina, which stands at the confluence of the Kip and the Clyde, also takes its name from the river. Scotland's first marina, it opened with 250 berths in 1971 and was one of only three in the UK at that time. It has expanded considerably since then and now (2018) has over 600 berths.

== Kip Marina Village ==
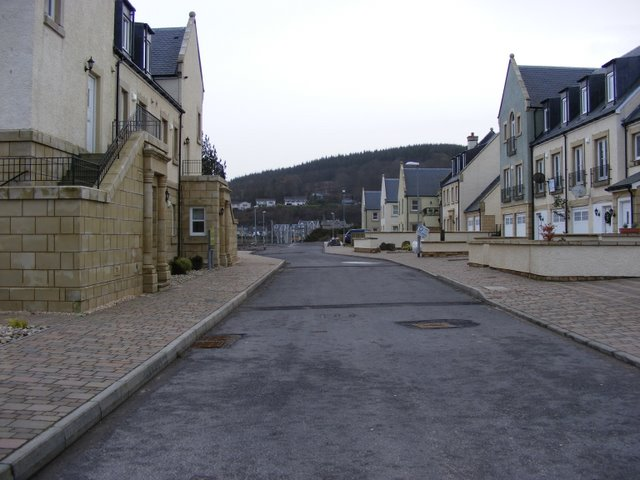
Kip Marina Village

A recently built (2000s) housing estate, located adjacent to the marina. It stands on three sides of the marina, giving most of the houses marina views, with some also enjoying uninterrupted views of the Firth of Clyde. Kip Marina Village is considered part of Inverkip, but is physically separated from the main village by the busy A78 Main Road. A footbridge provides access from the centre of Inverkip to the marina and Kip Marina Village.

== Gallery ==
Kip Water Photo Gallery - From Source To Sea

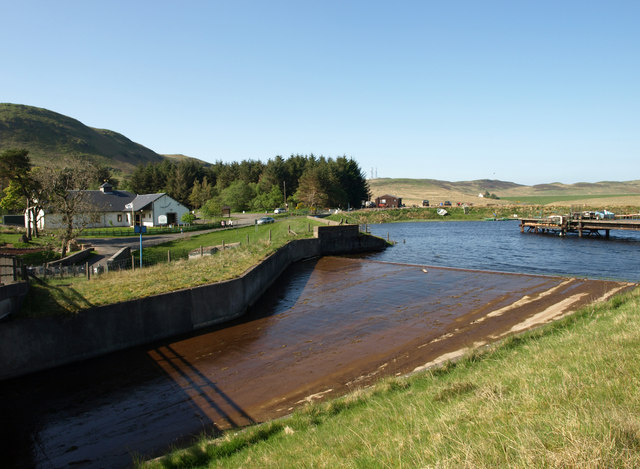
The source of Kip Water at Compensation Reservoir

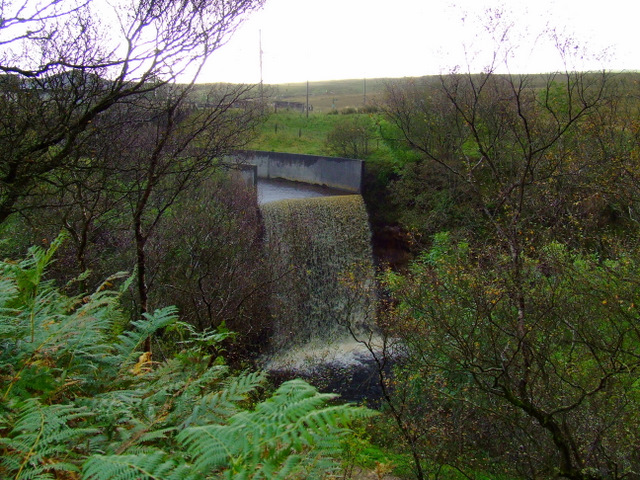
Kip Water waterfall at Compensation Reservoir outflow

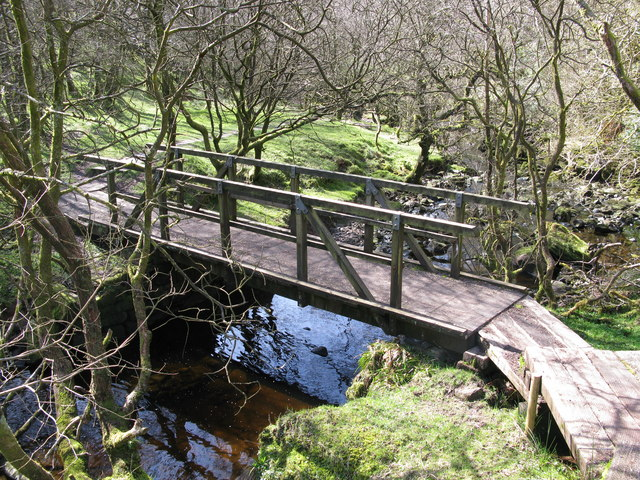
Kip Water near the top of Shielhill Glen

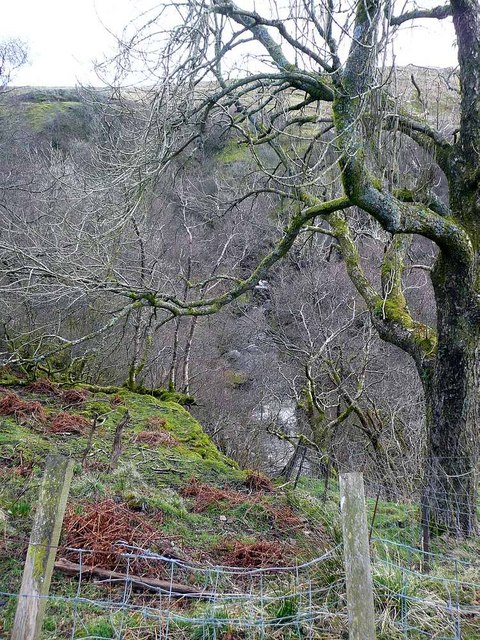
Kip Water in Shielhill Glen

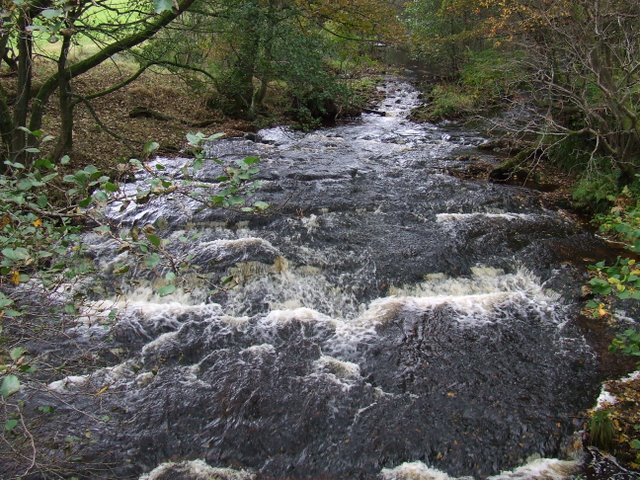
Kip Water upstream from the bridge at Millhouse

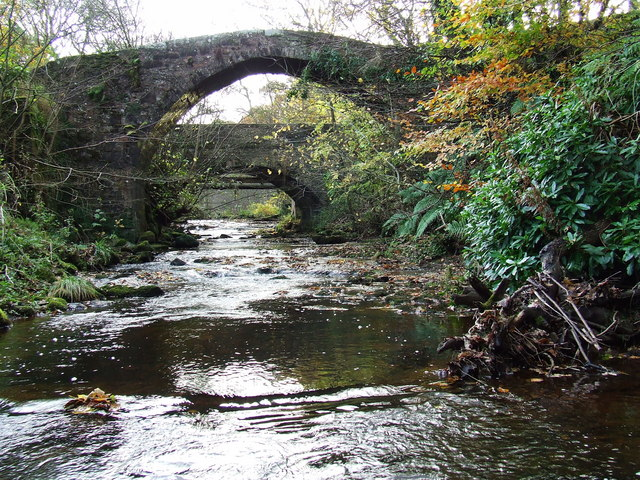
'Roman Bridge' crossing Kip Water at Millhouse

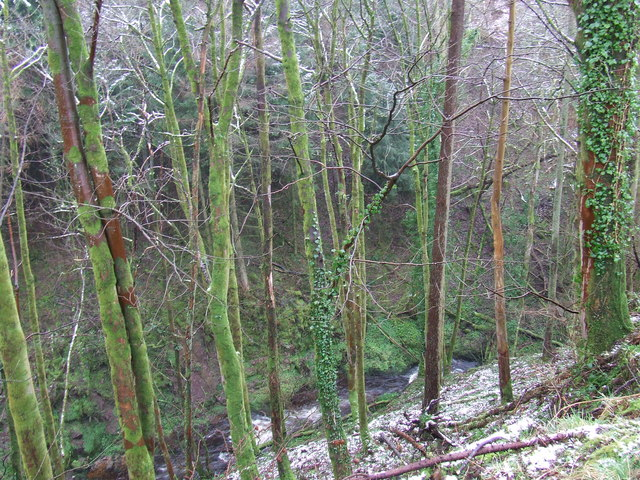
Kip Water in Dunrod Glen

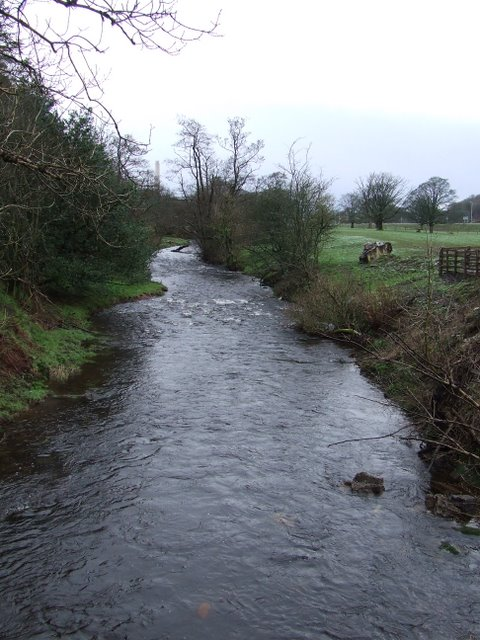
Kip Water at Bankfoot Farm

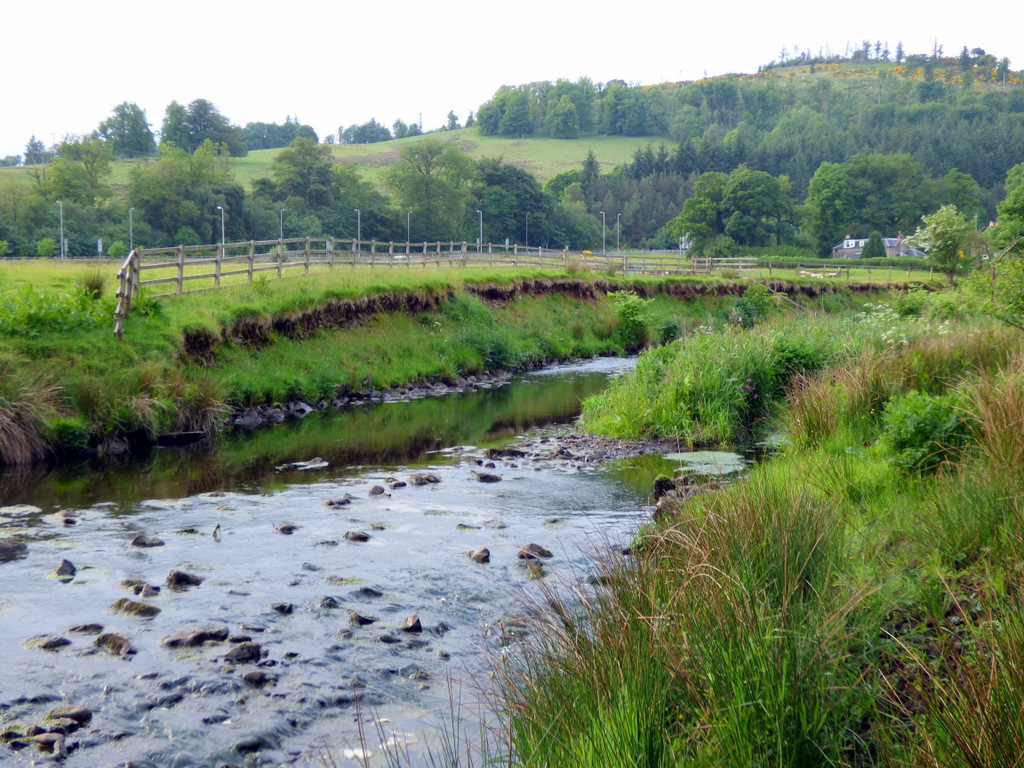
Land erosion just downstream of Bankfoot, which can be seen in the background

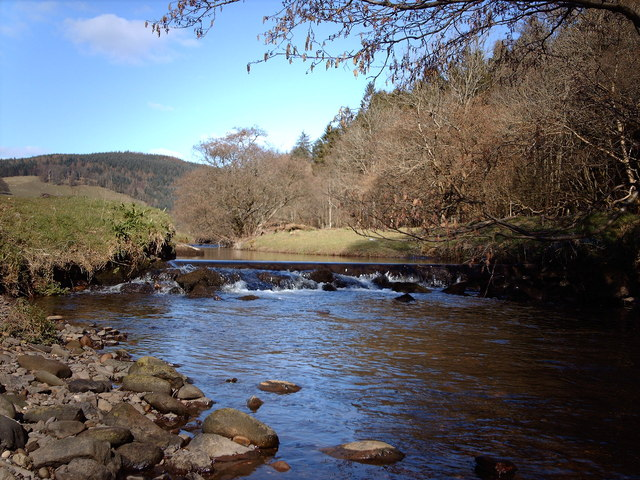
A weir on Kip Water just above Bridgend

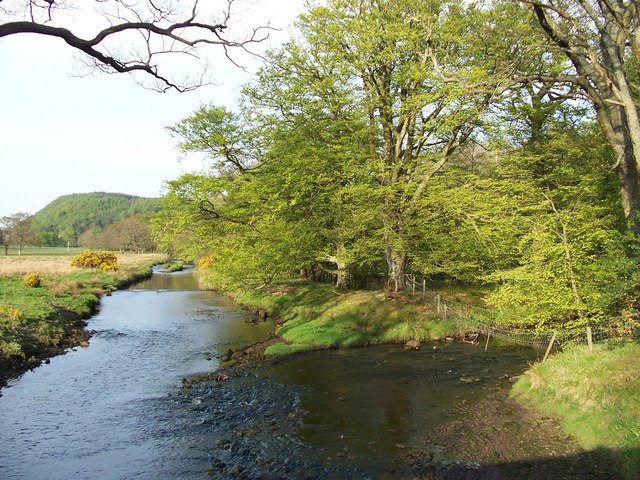
Kip Water. Daff Water joins on the right

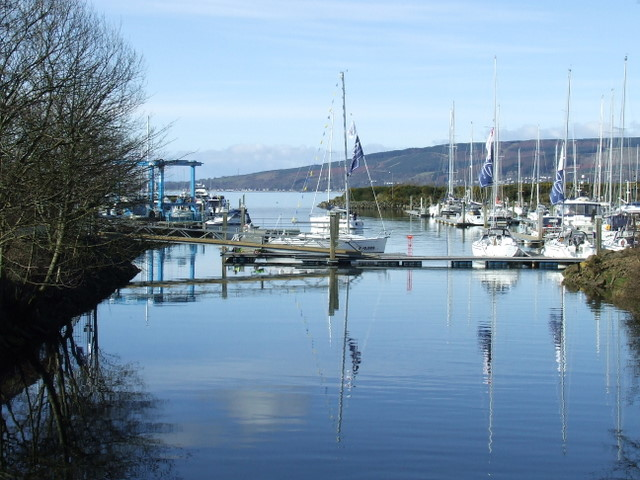
Kip Water entering Kip Marina

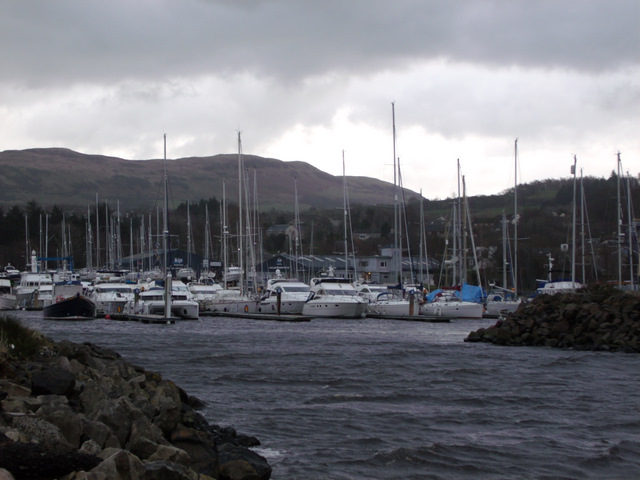
Kip Water enters the Clyde at this point
