= List of listed buildings in Inverkip, Inverclyde =

This is a list of listed buildings in the parish of Inverkip in Inverclyde, Scotland (covering the villages of Inverkip and Wemyss Bay as well as the westernmost parts of Gourock and Greenock).

== List ==
Name	Location	Date listed	Grid ref. (Note: Sometimes known as OSGB36, the grid reference (where provided) is based on the British national grid reference system used by the Ordnance Survey. • "Guide to National Grid". Ordnance Survey. • "Get-a-map". Ordnance Survey.)	Geo-coordinates	Notes	LB number (Note: Historic Environment Scotland assign a unique alphanumeric identifier to each designated site in Scotland, for listed buildings this always begins with "LB", for example "LB12345".)	Image
Bothy House And No. 15, Bridgend, By Inverkip				55°54′45″N 4°51′39″W	Category B	12469	Upload Photo
Langhouse, Daff Glen, By Inverkip				55°54′19″N 4°51′28″W	Category B	12472	Upload Photo
Station Cottages Wemyss Bay				55°52′35″N 4°53′19″W	Category C(S)	12475	Upload another image
Levan Castle (Restored Ruin), Adjoining Castle Levan, Cloch Road, By Gourock				55°56′50″N 4°51′31″W	Category B	12478	Upload Photo
St. Joseph's R. C. Church, Forbes Place, Wemyss Bay				55°53′16″N 4°53′16″W	Category C(S)	12470	Upload another image
Cloch Lighthouse				55°56′32″N 4°52′43″W	Category B	13820	Upload another image See more images
Ardgowan House, Inverkip				55°55′01″N 4°52′12″W	Category A	12480	Upload another image
Ardgowan Castle (Ruin), 200 Yds. Sw Of Ardgowan House, Inverkip				55°54′57″N 4°52′22″W	Category B	13642	Upload Photo
Wemyss Bay Road, Dunloe And Mansfield, Including Boundary Walls And Gatepiers				55°53′05″N 4°53′27″W	Category B	48936	Upload another image
"Roman Bridge" (Sic.) Over Kip Water At Millhouse, Dunrod Glen, By Inverkip				55°54′47″N 4°50′41″W	Category B	12468	Upload Photo
Inverkip Village Ellenbank				55°54′26″N 4°52′32″W	Category B	12471	Upload Photo
Station House Wemyss Bay				55°52′35″N 4°53′20″W	Category C(S)	12474	Upload Photo
Alexander Place, Main Street, Inverkip				55°54′28″N 4°52′19″W	Category C(S)	12466	Upload Photo
"Woodside" Main Street, Inverkip				55°54′25″N 4°52′33″W	Category B	12467	Upload Photo
Inverkip Parish Church. Inverkip				55°54′33″N 4°51′56″W	Category B	12465	Upload Photo
Greenock, Inverkip Road, Ravenscraig Hospital, Including Ancillary Structures				55°56′18″N 4°47′58″W	Category B	51132	Upload Photo
Wemyss Bay railway station				55°52′34″N 4°53′22″W	Category A	12473	Upload another image
Castle Levan And West Lodge, Cloch Road, By Gourock				55°56′52″N 4°51′32″W	Category C(S)	12477	Upload another image See more images
North Lodge Gatepiers And Gates, Ardgowan House, By Inverkip				55°55′22″N 4°52′17″W	Category B	12479	Upload another image

== Key ==
The scheme for classifying buildings in Scotland is:

- Category A: "buildings of national or international importance, either architectural or historic; or fine, little-altered examples of some particular period, style or building type."
- Category B: "buildings of regional or more than local importance; or major examples of some particular period, style or building type, which may have been altered."
- Category C: "buildings of local importance; lesser examples of any period, style, or building type, as originally constructed or moderately altered; and simple traditional buildings which group well with other listed buildings."

In March 2016 there were 47,288 listed buildings in Scotland. Of these, 8% were Category A, and 50% were Category B, with the remaining 42% being Category C.

== See also ==
- List of listed buildings in Inverclyde

== Bibliography ==
- All entries, addresses and coordinates are based on data from Historic Scotland. This data falls under the Open Government Licence
