= MV Akka =

Swedish cargo ship and Scottish dive site

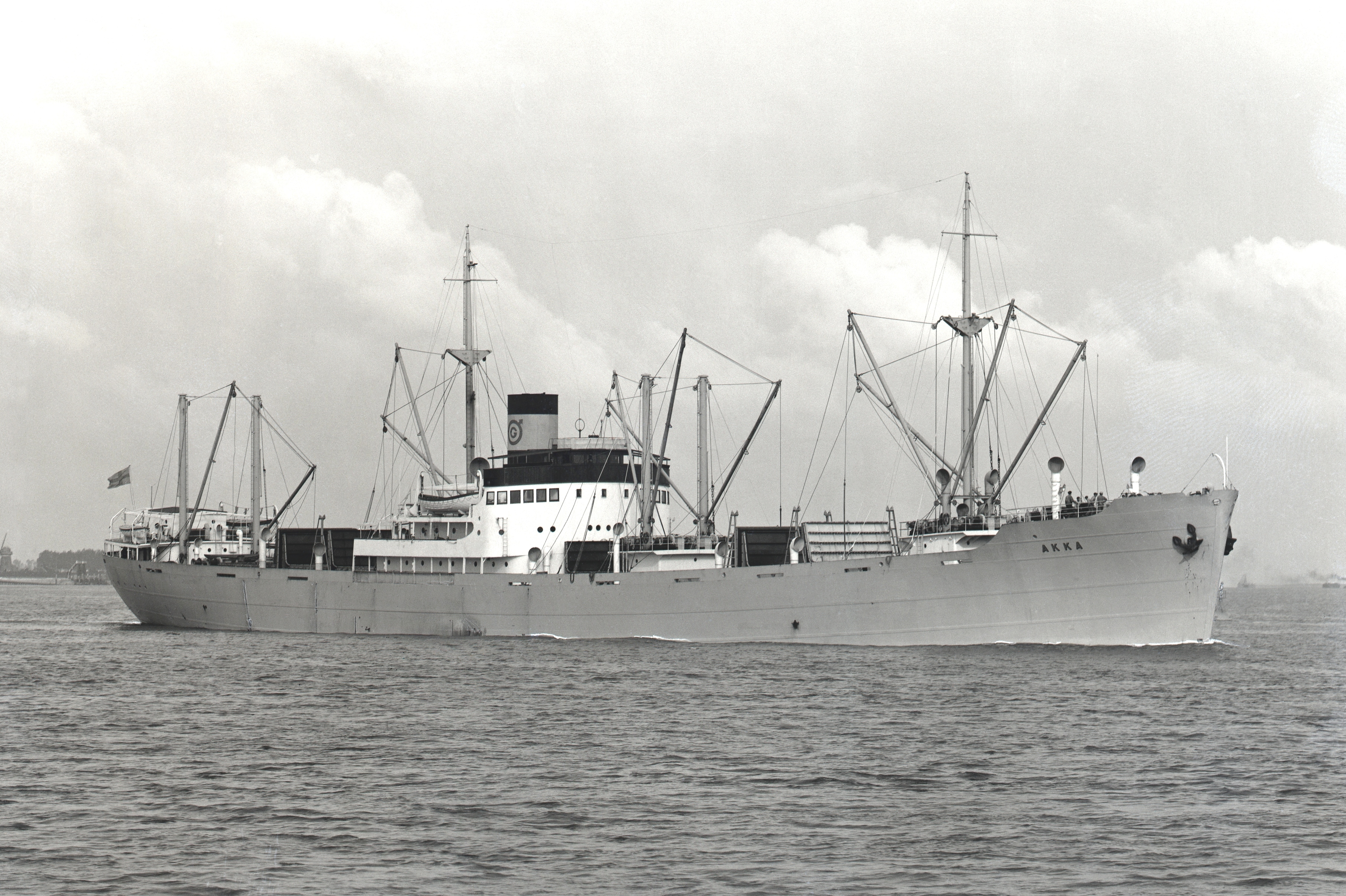
- Akka under way, probably in the Scheldt

History

Sweden
- Name: Akka
- Owner: Trafik Ab Grängesberg–Oxelösunds
- Operator: M Waldenström
- Port of registry: Stockholm
- Builder: A/B Götaverken
- Yard number: 568
- Launched: 6 May 1942
- Sponsored by: 26 July 1942
- Identification: IMO number: 3008535; Swedish official number 8535; call sign SFMN
- Fate: ran aground, 1956

General characteristics
- Type: cargo ship
- Tonnage: 5,409 GRT, 3,553 NRT, 8,960 DWT
- Length: 442 ft 10 in (135.0 m) overall; 434.5 ft (132.4 m) registered
- Beam: 56.7 ft (17.3 m)
- Draught: 25 ft 10 3/4 in (7.89 m)
- Depth: 24.3 ft (7.4 m)
- Decks: 1
- Installed power: 6-cylinder Götaverken diesel; 744 NHP; 4,200 bhp
- Propulsion: 1 × screw
- Speed: 12 knots (22 km/h)
- Crew: 1956: 33
- Sensors & processing systems: as built: wireless direction finding; by 1948: as above, plus radar
- Notes: Sister ships: Sarek, Sagged, Suorva, Saivo Coordinates:55°56′42.42″N 4°54′23.82″W

MV Akka was a Swedish cargo motor ship that was built in Gothenburg in 1942. In 1956 she ran aground in the Firth of Clyde. Six of her 33 crew were killed. Her wreck, off Dunoon, is now a wreck diving site.

== Akka-class ships ==
Akka was the lead ship of a class of five single-screw motor ships that A/B Götaverken built for Trafikaktiebolaget Grängesberg–Oxelösunds between 1942 and 1944. Her sister ships were Sarek; Sagged; Suorva; and Saivo.

== Building and registration ==
Götaverken built Akka as yard number 568. She was launched on 6 May 1942, and completed on 29 July. Her lengths were 442 ft 10 in (134.98 m) overall and 434.5 ft (132.4 m) registered. Her beam was 56.7 ft (17.3 m); her depth was 24.3 ft (7.4 m); and her draught was 25 ft 10 3/4 in (7.89 m). Her tonnages were 5,409 GRT; 3,553 NRT; and 8,960 DWT.

Her single screw was driven by a six-cylinder, single-acting, two-stroke diesel engine. It was rated at 744 NHP or 4,200 bhp, and gave her a speed of 12 knots (22 km/h).

Akka was equipped with wireless direction finding. By 1948, she was equipped with radar.

Grängesberg–Oxelösunds registered Akka in Stockholm. Her Swedish official number was 8535, and call sign SFMN. When IMO Numbers were introduced, hers was 3008535.

== Loss ==
On 4 April 1956, Akka left Oxelösund for Glasgow with a cargo of iron ore. On 9 April she entered the Firth of Clyde. At about 21:00 hrs that evening, her steering gear failed, which led to her grounding her on the Gantocks. Her port side had been holed for almost half her length, and water was rapidly filling her number two hold. Master, Captain Sundin, ordered her engines reversed, but this only hastened the ingress of water to her holds and engine room.

Captain Sundin gave the order to abandon ship. Within three or four minutes of striking the rocks, Akka heeled over to port, and sank. This caused a swell, which swamped those lifeboats that had been launched, and throwing their occupants into the sea. Three crewmen were killed on the scene, and a further three died on the way to hospital.

== Wreck ==
Akka lay on the seabed, with only her two mastheads showing above the surface of the sea. Three months later, a passing fishing boat collided with her wreck. Metal Industries, Limited of Gare Loch then removed her masts, and the upper two levels of her bridge superstructure, to eliminate the hazard to navigation. The rest of the wreck lies intact on an even keel. The seabed is 30 metres (98 ft) below the sea surface at her bow, and 40 metres (130 ft) below the surface at her stern.

Akka is the largest shipwreck in the Firth of Clyde that divers can reach by using compressed air. Divers can explore much of the wreck, but risks include disturbance to the mud causing poor visibility. The wreck is rich in fauna, including sea anemones; hydroids; nudibranches; sea squirts; and many species of fish. Seals are frequent visitors.

== Bibliography ==
- Lloyd's Register of Shipping (PDF). Vol. II.–Steamers and Motorships of 300 tons. Trawlers, Tugs, Dredgers, etc. Sailing Vessels. London: Lloyd's Register of Shipping. 1943 – via Southampton City Council.
- Lloyd's Register of Shipping. Vol. I. A–L. Steamers, Motorships, Sailing Vessels, &c. London: Lloyd's Register of Shipping. 1948 – via Internet Archive.
- Lloyd's Register of Shipping. Vol. I Register of Ships. London: Lloyd's Register of Shipping. 1955 – via Internet Archive.
- Macdonald, Rod (1993). Dive Scotland's Greatest Wrecks. Edinburgh: Mainstream Publishing. ISBN 978-1851585328.
