= Cragburn Pavilion =

Coordinates: 55.95633°N 4.82814°W

The Cragburn Pavilion was built in Gourock in 1935-6 by J. & J.A. Carrick, in brick and stucco with prominent art deco fluting along its front North-facing elevation. It consisted of a large auditorium with stage, ancillary rooms and a restaurant/bar area.

Cragburn was built to try to attract a greater share of Scotland's growing holiday trade. Many local bands played regularly for dancers from 1936 to 1966 including Charlie Harkin's Kit Kat Orchestra and Henri Morrison and his Swingstars. Both bands were contenders in the All British Dance Band Championships.

As Cragburn became established, many of Britain's top bands visited Cragburn, including Joe Loss, Oscar Rabin, Lew Stone, and many more. Cragburn also hosted a summer show each year with top artists from Scotland including Tommy Morgan, Alec Finlay, Larry Marshall, and The One O-Clock Gang.

As the pop scene started taking over in the 1960s, the big band scene started to go into decline, and although the pavilion continued to be used as a facility for variety shows, pantomimes and functions by the local authority who owned it, it was becoming clear that greater financial benefit could be had by selling off the land for development. Cragburn pavilion was closed in the 1990s, and a block of flats has been built on the original site.
