= The Gantocks =

Gantock Rocks Light
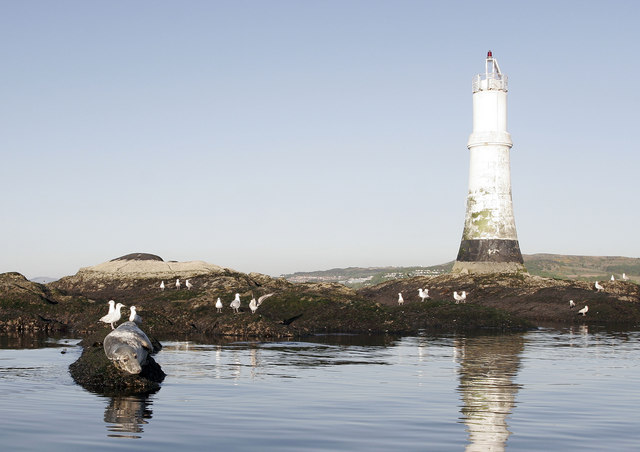
- The Gantocks and navigation beacon
- Location: Firth of Clyde, Scotland.
- Coordinates: 55.940816°N 4.9177772°W National grid reference NS 17869 75820

Tower
- Constructed: c.1886
- Height: 44 ft (13 m)
- Fog signal: No

Light
- Focal height: 12 m (39 ft)
- Range: 6 nmi (11 km)
- Characteristic: Fl R 6s

The Gantocks is a small group of rocks lying off Dunoon in the upper Firth of Clyde, West of Scotland.

A navigation beacon was constructed on the rocks circa 1886. The beacon is 44 feet (13 metres) in height.

The MV Akka was lost, after grounding on the Gantocks on 9 April 1956. The PS Waverley grounded on the rocks on 15 July 1977, with 715 passengers on board.

The Gantocks beacon was repainted and maintenance carried out during 2018.

== See also ==
- Cloch

== Gallery ==
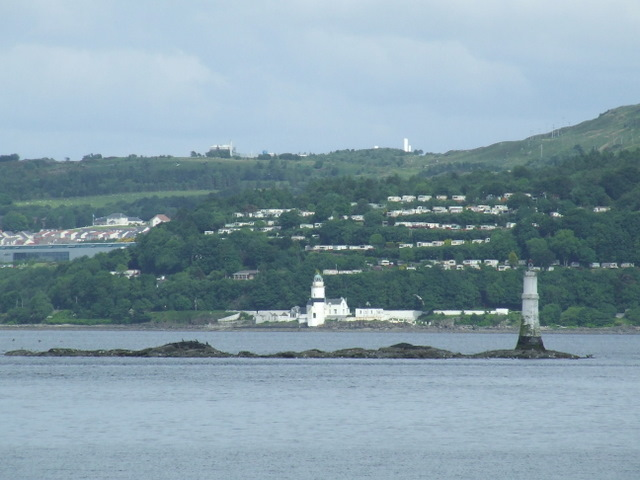
The Gantocks Beacon with Cloch Lighthouse behind

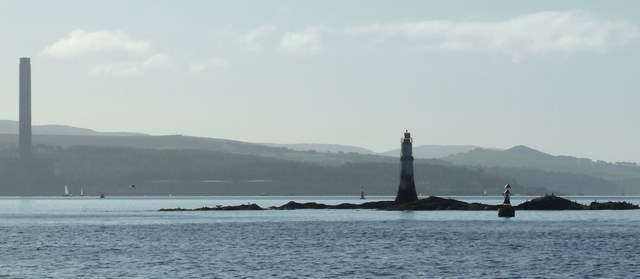
The Gantocks

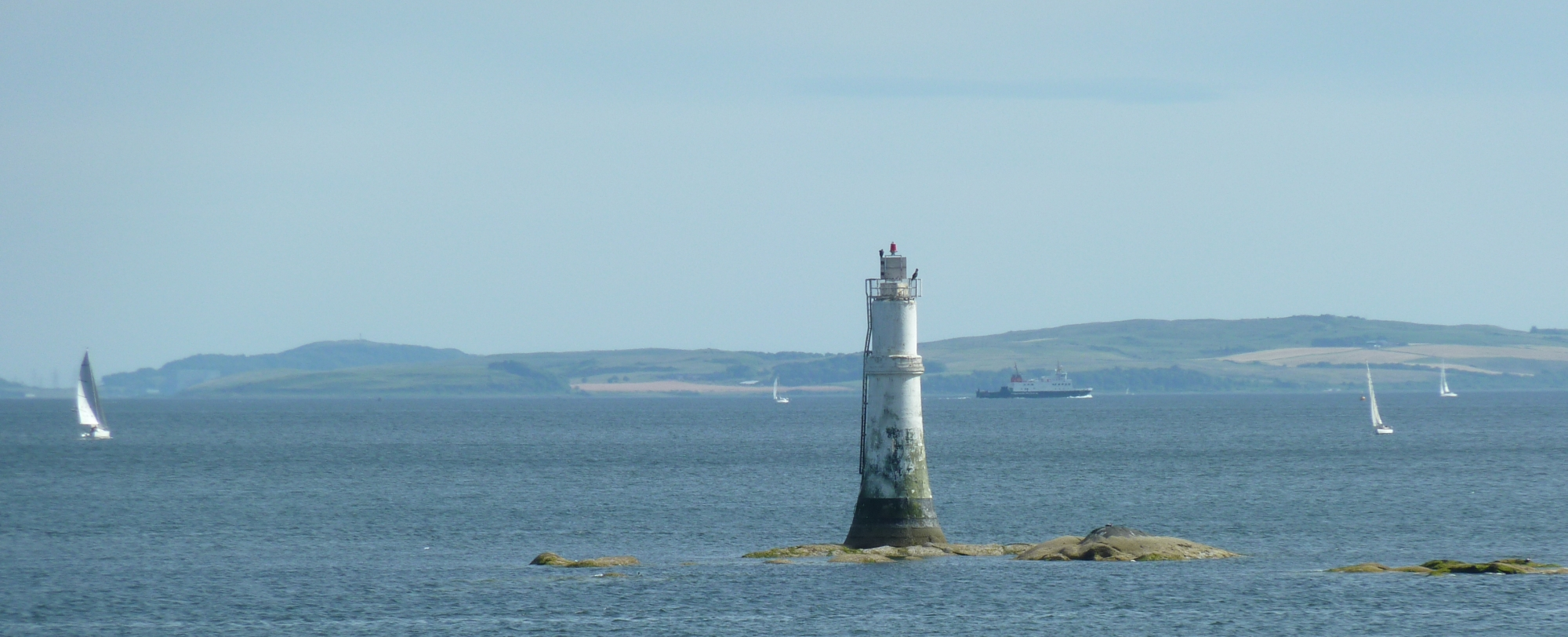
Gantocks Beacon
