= Castle Levan =

Fortified tower house in Inverclyde, Scotland

Coordinates: 55.9470°N 4.8587°W

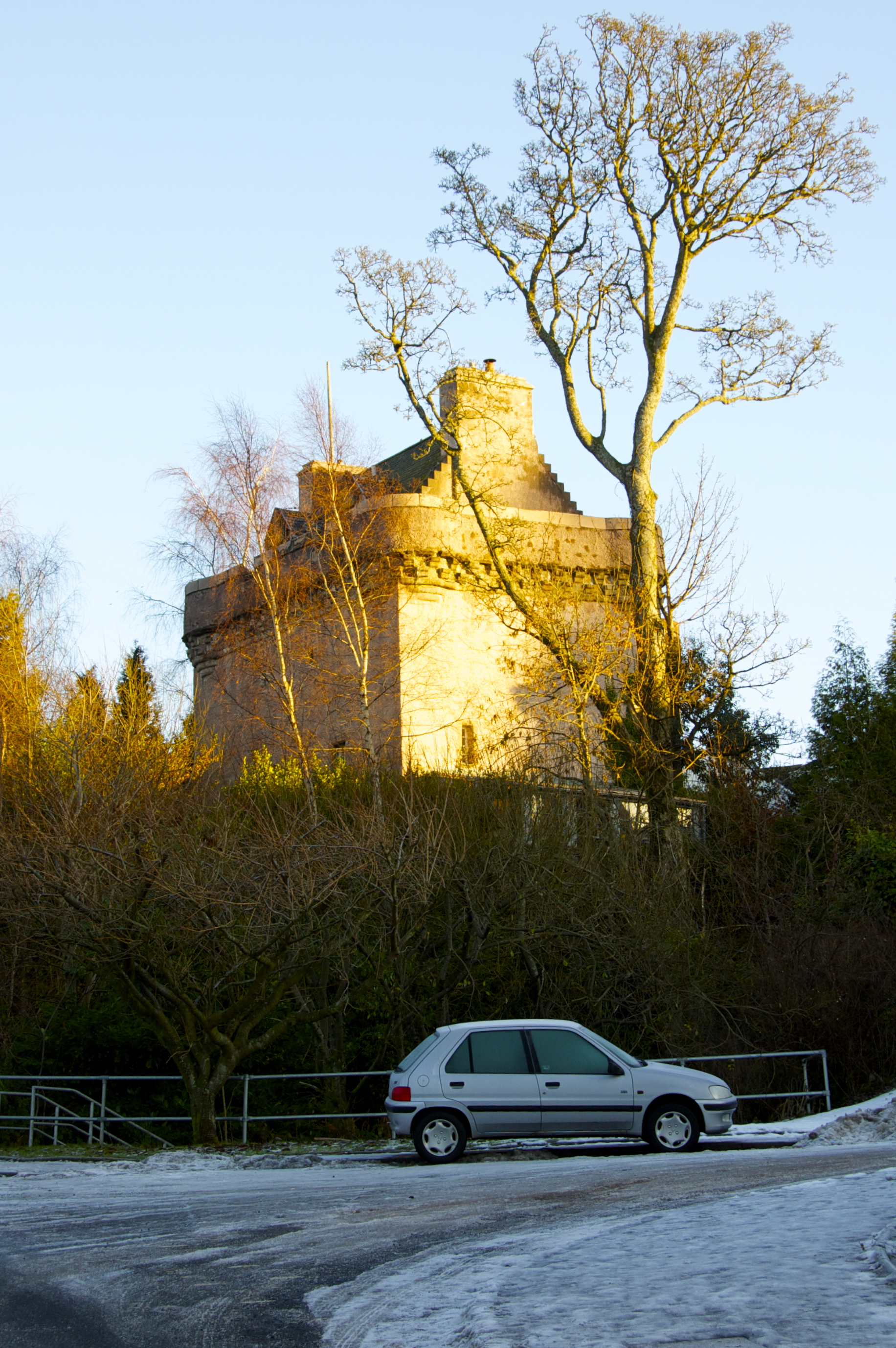
Castle Levan.

Castle Levan (also known as Levan Castle) is a fortified tower house in Levan area of Gourock, Inverclyde, Scotland.

A building had been on the site from the 14th century, but the present structure was substantially enlarged after 1547 and formed part of the Ardgowan Estates. In the 19th century a large mansion was built within a few metres of the ruined castle and was given the same name.

The original castle was renovated in the 1980s. The castle has undergone further renovations in 2016 under its new owner, Kim Munro, who runs it as a bed & breakfast.

== See also ==
- List of listed buildings in Inverkip, Inverclyde
