= Cloch =

Lighthouse on the Firth of Clyde, Scotland

Cloch Lighthouse
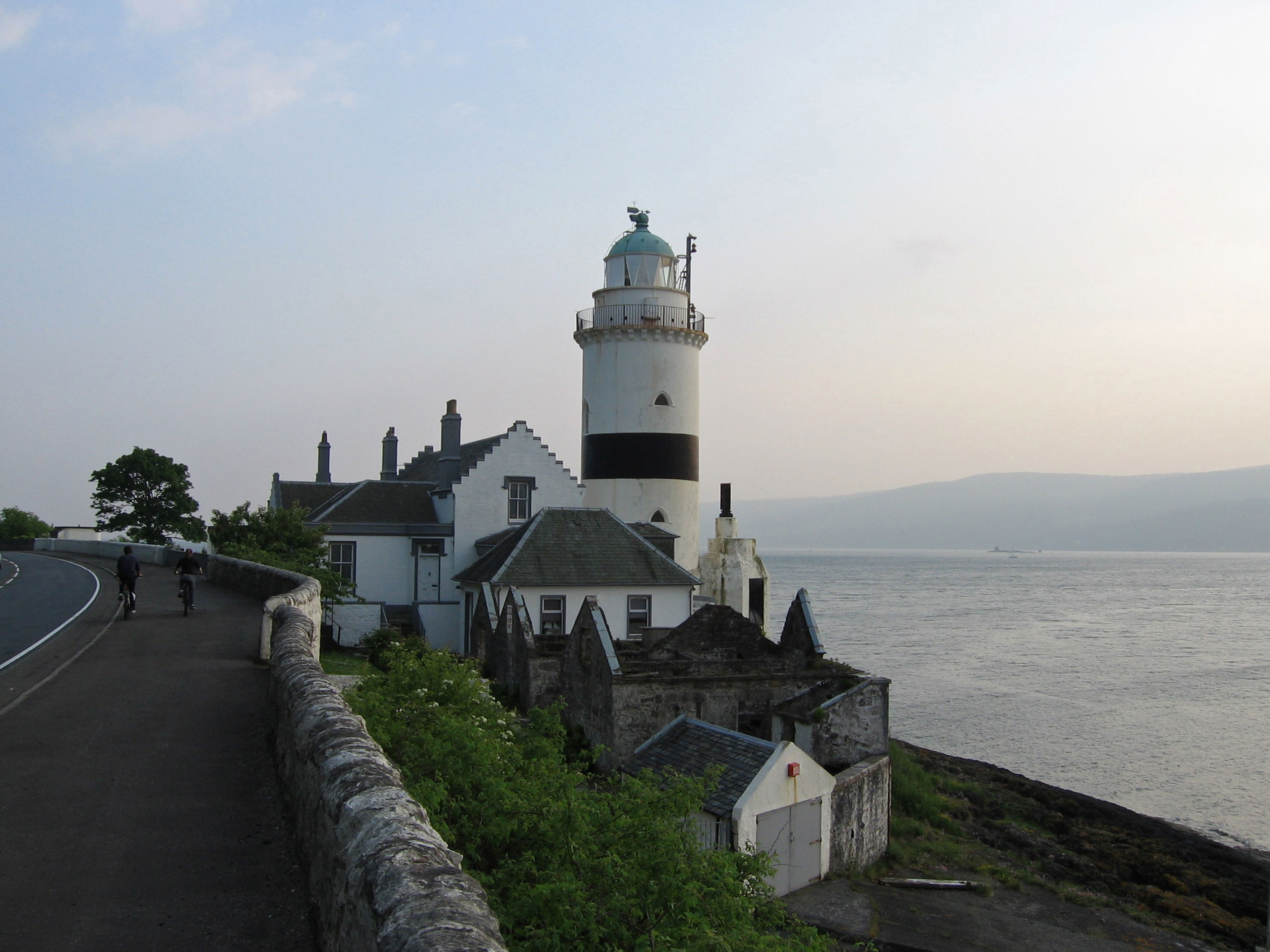
- Cloch Point light from the north, looking towards Innellan
- Location: Firth of Clyde; NS202758
- OS grid: NS2031975877
- Coordinates: 55.94232°N 4.87877°W

Tower
- Constructed: 1797
- Built by: Thomas Smith, Robert Stevenson
- Construction: white tower with a black band
- Height: 76 feet (23 m)
- Operator: Clyde Port Authority
- Heritage: category B listed building
- Fog signal: (c.1895)

Light
- Focal height: 76 feet (23 m)
- Light source: Oil (1797–1829) argand lamp (1829–c.1900) acetylene (c.1900–)
- Intensity: 40,000 candela
- Range: 14 nautical miles
- Characteristic: Fl. W 3sec

Cloch or Cloch Point (Scottish Gaelic: stone) is a point on the east coast of the Firth of Clyde, Inverclyde, Scotland. There has been a lighthouse on the point since 1797 to warn ships of The Gantocks, a shipping hazard in the Firth. Later circa 1886, a navigation beacon was constructed on the Gantocks rocks.

== Location ==
Cloch Point lies on the A770, north of Inverkip, three miles south-west of Gourock, on the east shore of the Firth of Clyde, directly opposite Dunoon.

== Lighthouse ==
The Cloch Lighthouse was designed by Thomas Smith and his son-in-law Robert Stevenson. The building was completed in 1797. There appear to be two generations of keepers' houses, the older now used as stores and the more recent having crow-stepped gables. The short circular-section tower has a corbelled walkway and triangular windows. The foghorns were added between 1895 and 1897.

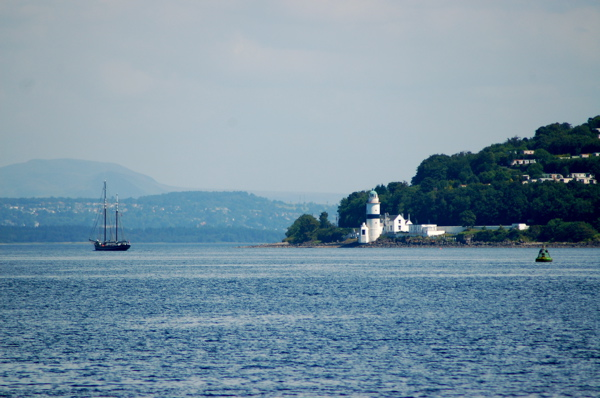
Cloch Point Lighthouse

The light was built by John Clarkson (engineer); Kermack and Gall built the tower, while Smith and Stevenson installed the oil lantern which was first lit on 11 August 1797. The light was replaced in 1829 with an argand lamp and silvered reflector. About 1900, it was lit with acetylene. A radio beacon was installed about 1931.

The dioptric and catadioptric lenses floated in baths of mercury and were rotated by a clockwork mechanism powered by falling weights. As well as tending the light, the keepers had to wind the mechanism by hand every two to three hours.

Today, the light is fully automated and unmanned. The main light has been replaced by a light on a pole outside the lantern room.

== See also ==
- List of listed buildings in Inverkip, Inverclyde
