= Ernest Woodroofe =

British businessman and former chairman of Unilever (1912–2002)

Sir Ernest Woodroofe
- Photo from Daily Telegraph, 2002
- Born: 6 January 1912; Lancashire, UK
- Died: 31 March 2002 (aged 90); Surrey, UK
- Education: University of Leeds
- Occupations: Businessman; Physicist
- Title: Chairman of Unilever
- Term: 1970-1974
- Predecessor: Lord Cole
- Spouses: Margaret Downes (m. 1938; death 1961); Enid Arnolde (m. 1962; died 2002)

Sir Ernest Woodroofe (6 January 1912 – 31 March 2002) was chairman of Unilever from 1970 to 1974, when the company was the second largest in the world, outside of America.

== Early life and education ==
Ernest George Woodroofe was born in Toxteth Park, Lancashire, England, to Ernest, a railway goods station manager, and Ada, née Dickenson. His family moved to Leeds, Yorkshire, when he was six months old. Woodroofe won a scholarship to Cockburn High School, Leeds, where he became head prefect and school captain. After leaving school, he attended the University of Leeds, earning a first class degree in physics, under Professor Richard Whiddington, then a doctorate in atomic physics, specialising in electron balance. He taught himself German, the language of engineering at the time.

== Unilever ==
In 1935, Professor Whiddington introduced Woodroofe to his cousin, Herbert Davis, at Anglo-Dutch consumer goods company Unilever, which had been formed in 1930. Woodroofe's first roles were in product development, specifically measuring the efficiency of equipment, and transportation management at Loders and Nucoline, Unilever's seed-crushing and oil refining subsidiary in Silvertown, London. In 1944, at the age of 32, Woodroofe moved to Gourock in Renfrewshire, Scotland, to manage four loss-making factories for British Oil and Cake Mills, Unilever's animal feeds arm. In 1949 he spent three months at the Harvard Advanced Management School. Two years later he became a director of British Oil and Cake Mills, overseeing the running of factories across Britain.

In 1955 he became the head of research for Unilever, co-ordinating research centres in the United States, United Kingdom and Europe. The following year he joined the group's British and Dutch boards of directors, and in 1961 he was appointed vice-chairman of the British board, a role that put him on the three-person Special Committee that co-ordinated the combined group. He continued to oversee research activities, including the development of frozen foods (under the Birds Eye brand), an expansion into dairy products and the development of an effective dandruff treatment. In 1970 he took over from Lord Cole as chair of the British board, holding the position until 1974. When he took over, the press called him the “quiet man” of the group.

== Other roles ==
=== Non-executive directorships ===
- Director – Burton Group (1974-1983)
- Director – Guthrie (1974-1982)
- Director – Schroders (1974-1989)

=== Education ===
- Honorary Associate – Liverpool College of Technology (1963)
- Governor – London Business School
- Visiting Fellow – Nuffield College, Oxford
- Member – Council for National Academic Awards
- Member – Council for Science and Society
- Member – Selection Committee, Commonwealth Fund and Harkness Fellows (1966-1970)
- Member – Government committee on the Organisation of Civil Science (1960s)

=== Other ===
- Chair – Review Body on Doctors’ and Dentists’ Remuneration (1974-1979)
- Director – British Gas Corporation, where he spoke out against the government's plan to break up the company, prior to privatising it. (1973-1982)
- Arbitrator – Milk Marketing Board Joint Committee (1974-1983)
- Chair – CBI Research Committee
- Chair – Trustees of the Leverhulme Trust (1974-1982)
- Vice President – Society of Chemical Industry
- Member – Royal Commission for the Exhibition of 1851 (1968-1984)

== Honours ==
- 1959 – Fellow of the Institute of Physics
- 1959 – Fellow of the Institution of Chemical Engineers
- 1972 – Commander of the Dutch Order of Orange-Nassau, for his services to Anglo-Dutch relations
- 1973 – Knighted in the Birthday Honours List
- 1980 – Honorary DSc, University of Liverpool
- Honorary LLD, University of Leeds
- Honorary doctorate, University of Surrey
- Honorary fellowship, UMIST
- Honorary ACT, Liverpool
- Honorary DSc, Cranfield School of Management

== Relevant publications ==
- Collected Speeches of Sir Ernest Woodroofe PhD, LL.D, F. Inst. P, F. I. Chem. E, Vice-Chairman Unilever Ltd May 1961-1970, Chairman Unilever Ltd, May 1970-1974. Pub: Economics and Statistics Department, Unilever House (1974)
- Catering for Uncertainty: The thirty-seventh Haldane memorial lecture delivered at Birkbeck College, London Pub: Birkbeck College (1974) delivered by Woodroofe ISBN 9780900975738
- Talking to: Maria Callas (and others) by Kenneth Harris. Pub: Weidenfeld & Nicolson London (1971) including an interview with Woodroofe
- The future as an academic discipline by H Eldredge et al. Pub: Elsevier (1975) including a contribution by Woodroofe

== Personal life ==
Woodroofe married Margaret Downes in 1938. They had one daughter. After Downes died, he married Enid Arnold in 1962. Woodroofe had a deep love of fly fishing, especially for salmon. He was a member of Endsleigh Fishing Club on the River Tamar in Devon and had his own beat on the River Lyd, a tributary of the Tamar. He was chair of the Atlantic Salmon Trust's scientific panel and was an activist for the preservation of the Tamar's water quality. Woodroofe was living in Puttenham, Surrey, when he died, aged 90. His memorial service was held at the Banqueting House, Whitehall, where Niall FitzGerald, the then chairman of Unilever, paid tribute.
