= Ravenscraig Hospital =

- NHS Greater Glasgow and Clyde
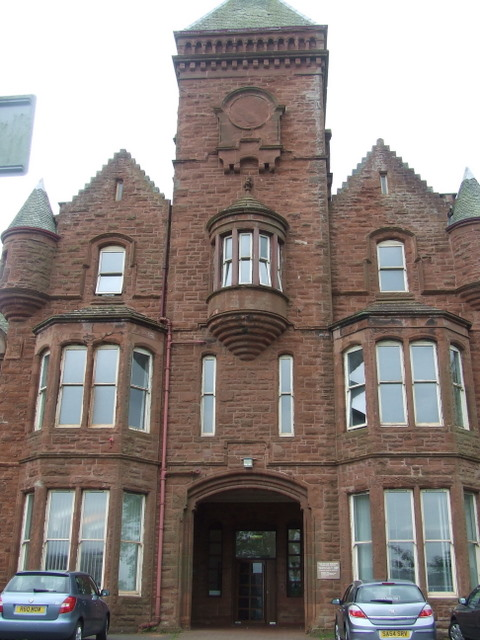
- Ravenscraig Hospital

- Shown in Inverclyde

Geography
- Location: Inverkip Road, Greenock, Scotland
- Coordinates: 55.9384°N 4.7995°W

Organisation
- Care system: NHS Scotland
- Type: Mental health

Services
- Emergency department: No

History
- Founded: 1879
- Closed: 2014

Links
- Lists: Hospitals in Scotland

Ravenscraig Hospital was a mental health facility in Inverkip Road, Greenock, Scotland. It was managed by NHS Greater Glasgow and Clyde.

== History ==
The foundation stone for the facility was laid by Earl of Mar and Kellie in September 1876. The facility was opened as the Smithston Asylum in March 1879. It served as a military hospital for wounded soldiers in the First World war and as a naval hospital for Canadian sailors during the Second World War. It joined the National Health Service as Ravenscraig Hospital in 1948 and two new 120-bedded units known as Corlic and Dunrod were built to the north of the main building in the 1960s. The original building closed in December 2005 and the remainder of the facilities closed in 2014.

The site was subsequently sold to a residential developer for a nominal sum; however in March 2019 toxic chemical contamination was found on the site giving rise to concerns about the development.

== See also ==
- List of listed buildings in Inverkip, Inverclyde
