= Ardgowan Castle =

Castle near the Firth of Clyde, Scotland

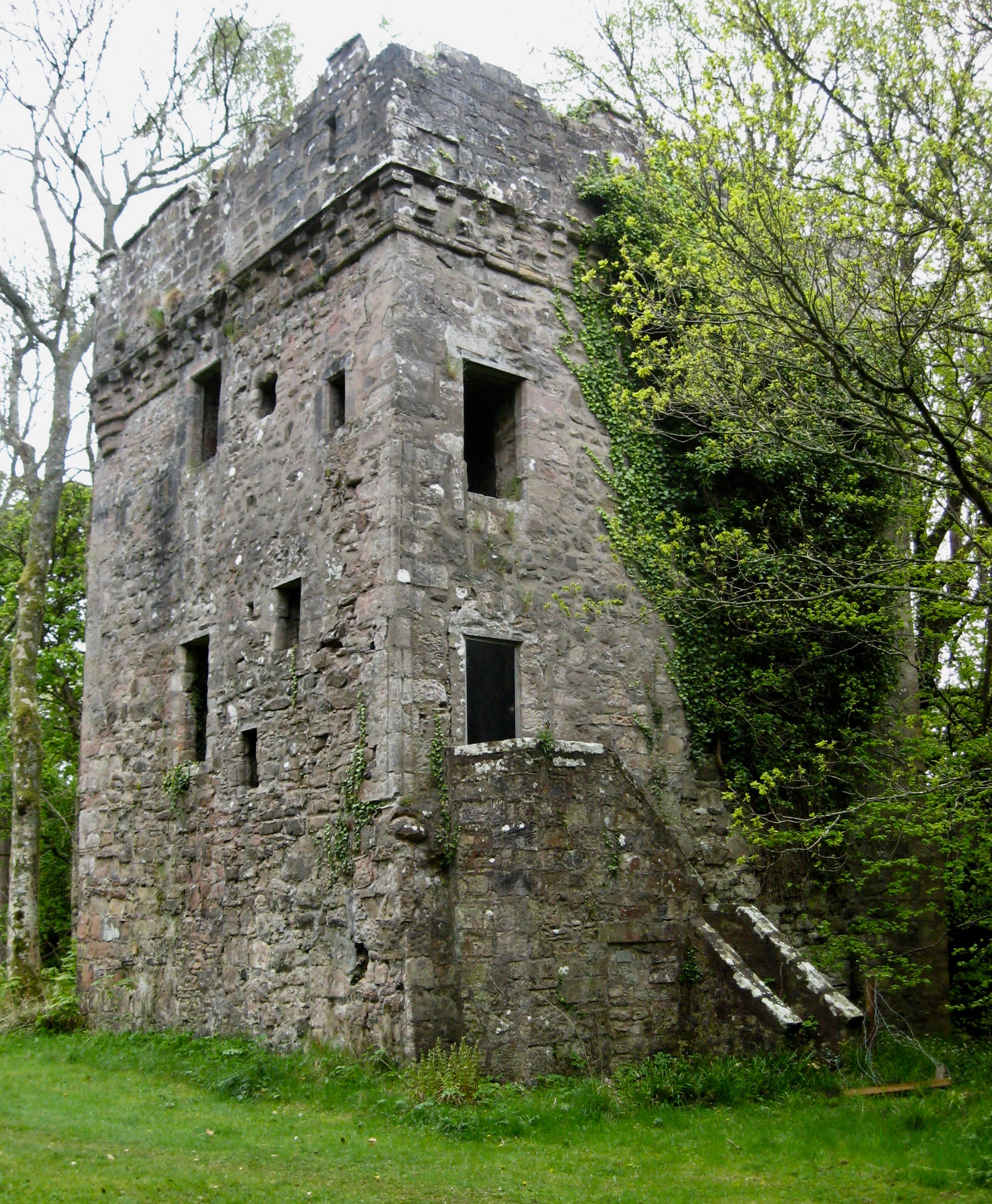
- Ardgowan Castle entrance stair

- Location of Ardgowan Castle in Inverclyde
- 55.9158°N 4.8727°W

Listed Building – Category B
- Designated: 10 June 1971
- Reference no.: LB13642

Ardgowan Castle, originally called Inverkip Castle, is located in the Private Garden of "Ardgowan House, Castle & Gardens" near Inverkip, Scotland. It is near the Firth of Clyde in Inverclyde, in the former county of Renfrewshire. The three-storey ruin of the 15th century tower house is protected as a category B listed building.

== Location ==
The castle is sited within the Private Gardens of Ardgowan House and is not accessible to the public. It is however visible from the public path that runs directly below. It is situated on a promontory of a raised beach jutting out at a height of 60 feet (18 m) above coastal flats, with a level top defended by steep slopes or cliffs to each side of the point. The Tower was likely preceded by a wooden watch tower, built to fend off Viking raiders. Inverkip Castle later became an important medieval fortress.

== History ==
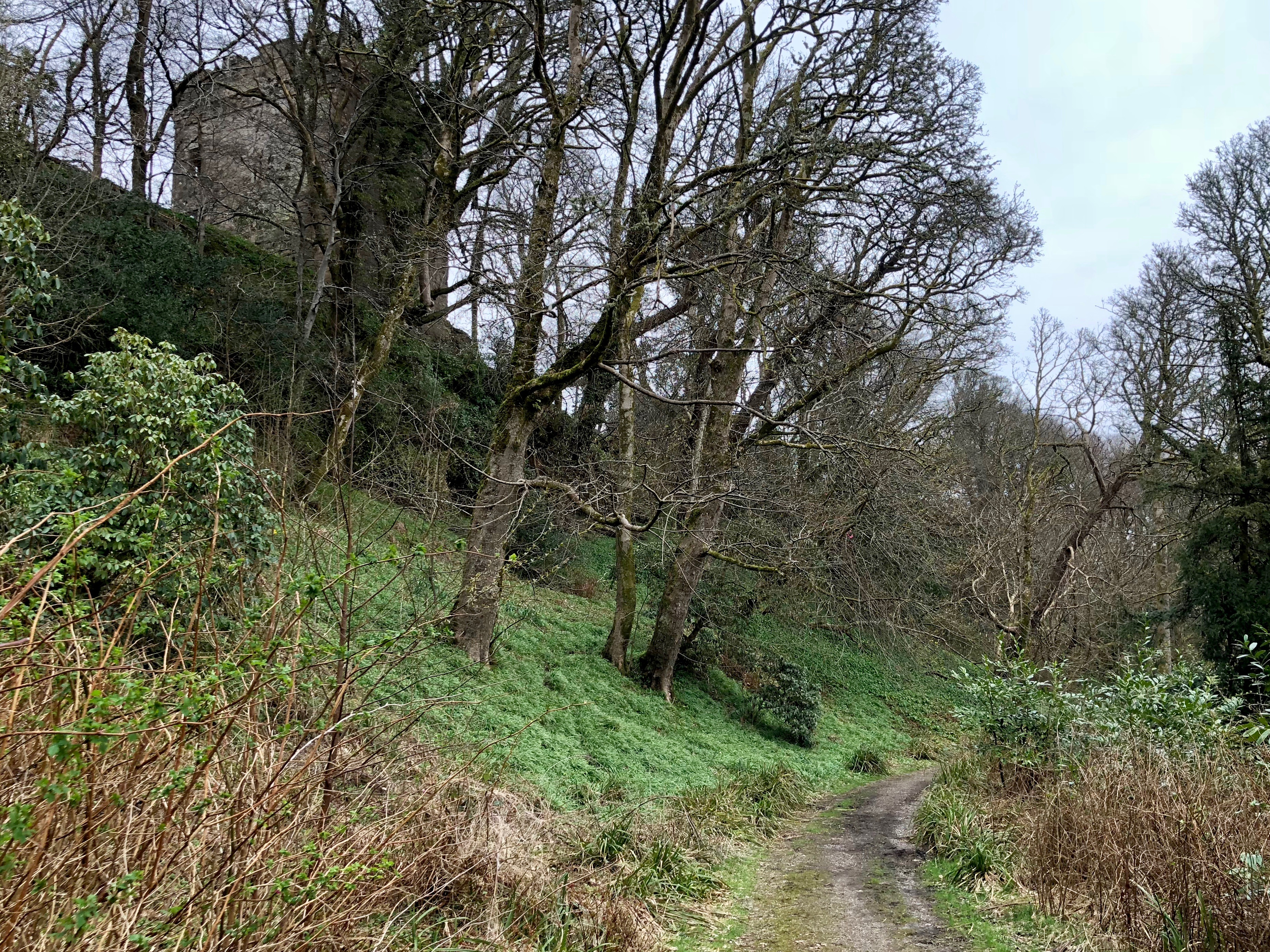
Ardgowan Castle atop south-east facing cliff, visible from the public path.

Inverkip Castle featured in what was later called the First War of Scottish Independence. In 1301, King Edward I of England sent two armies into Scotland, with the plan that they would meet up at Inverkip. The main force under his own command struck through the East of Scotland, while his son Edward, Prince of Wales, commanded a Western army which captured Turnberry Castle and Bothwell Castle, but the armies then met at Linlithgow to overwinter.

In 1302 Robert the Bruce, Earl of Carrick, submitted homage to Edward of England, and on 12 May 1303 Bruce provided forces to a muster at Roxburgh. While Edward invaded the East of Scotland, in July he ordered a contingent including Robert the Bruce and Aymer de Valence to press up through Clydesdale, and meet a large seaborne force led by Bruce's father-in-law the Earl of Ulster which attacked Rothesay Castle then besieged Inverkip Castle. By early September the joint force had taken both fortresses. Bruce is said to have taken part in the fight to seize Inverkip Castle, and then had the task of getting the siege engines north for the English assault on Stirling Castle: on 16 April 1304 Edward wrote to thank Bruce, referring in particular to the problem of finding "a waggon fit to carry the frame" of "the great engine of Inverkip".

In 1306, Inverkip was held for Edward by the Lothian Scot Sir Adam Gordon. Around mid March the castle was besieged by supporters of King Robert the Bruce, led by Robert Boyd of Cunningham. On 24 July 1306, after Bruce's defeat at the Battle of Methven, Edward gave orders that Sir Thomas Randolph was to be held prisoner in Inverkip castle, supervised by Gordon, with no option of bail: by September 1307 he had apparently been freed.

When Bruce's ally Sir James Douglas defeated Sir Philip Mowbray in 1307, Sir Philip left his forces and escaped to Inverkip Castle, as described in John Barbour's The Brus:

Sync throu the Largis, him allane
Till Ennerkip the way he tane,
Rigcht to the castell that wes then
Stuffyt all with Ingless men,
That him resaiffyt in daynte.

The English men later escaped from the castle by sea.

=== The Ardgowan Estate ===
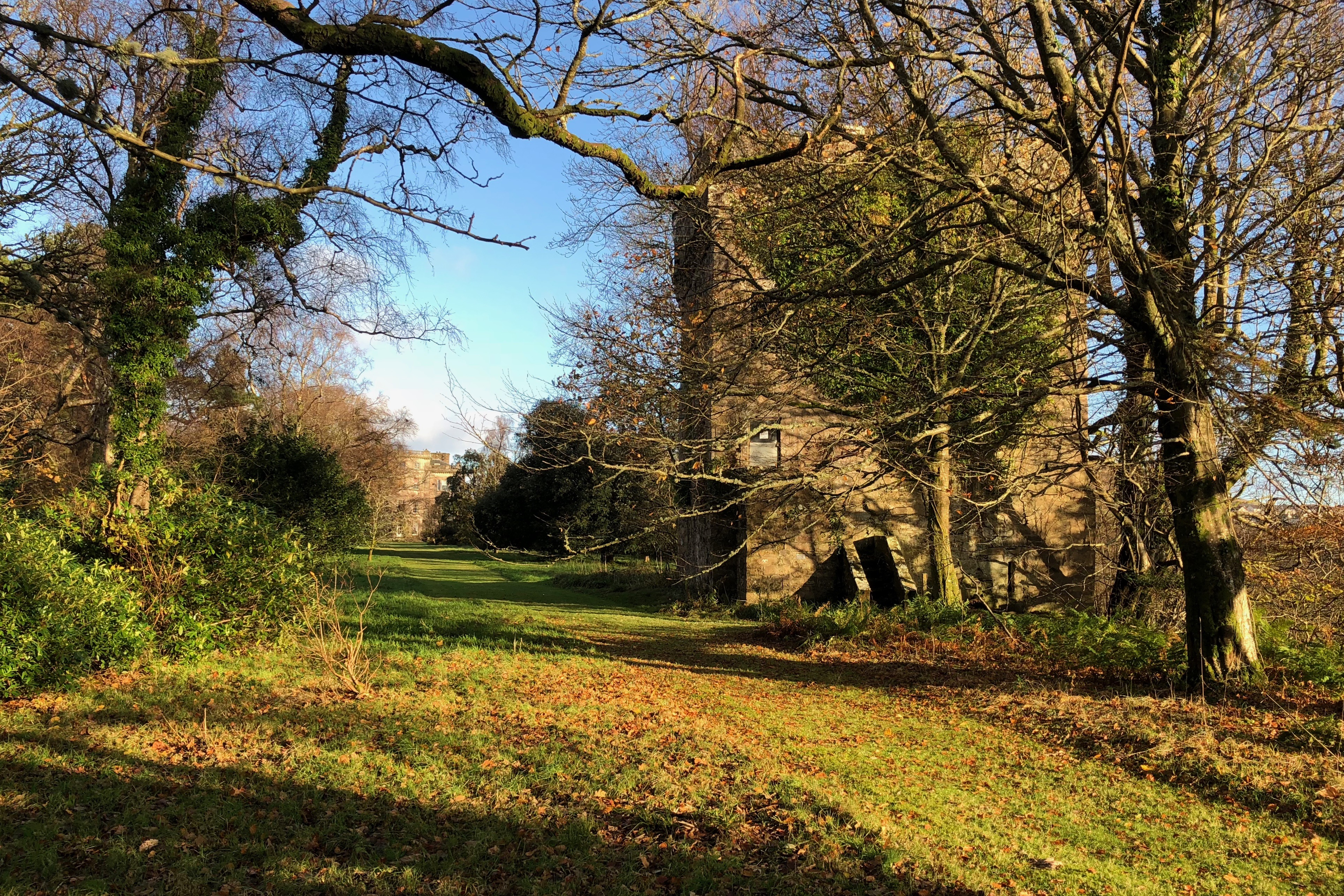
Ardgowan Castle, to the right of the lawn leading up to Ardgowan House.

In 1403, King Robert III granted the lands of Ardgowan to his natural son, Sir John Stewart. Ardgowan castle, now an inaccessible ruin, is a tower house built within the site of the earlier castle, and is dated to the late 15th century. It is sited on the south edge of the promontory, perched on a cliff.

In 1667 Archibald Stewart was created a Baronet, the title of which is still held by the Shaw Stewart family to this day. The 3rd Baronet married, in 1730, Helen Houston, heiress of the Shaws of Greenock. Their son Sir John Shaw Stewart, 4th Baronet, commissioned a design for Ardgowan House from the architect Hugh Cairncross. Construction began in 1798, and was completed around 1801, after which the old castle was abandoned. Its ruin was consolidated and repaired in 1936.

== See also ==
- List of listed buildings in Inverkip, Inverclyde
