= Ardgowan House =

Mansion on the Firth of Clyde, Scotland

Ardgowan House, Castle & Gardens
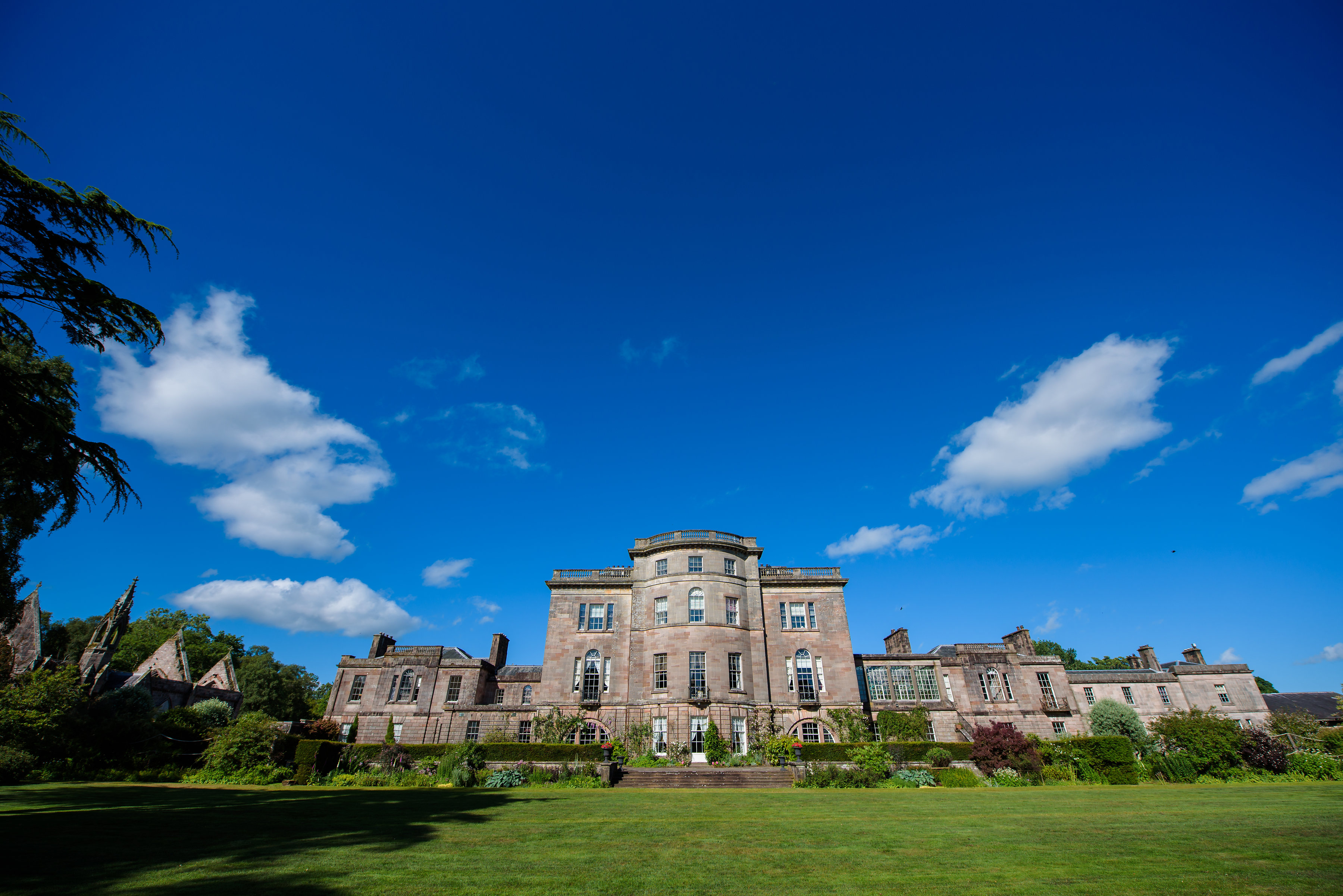
- Main entrance elevation, facing north-east

- Location of Ardgowan House in Inverclyde
- 55.9169°N 4.8698°W

Listed Building – Category A
- Designated: 10 June 1971
- Reference no.: LB12480

Inventory of Gardens and Designed Landscapes in Scotland
- Official name: Ardgowan
- Designated: 1 July 1987
- Reference no.: GDL00021

Ardgowan House, Castle & Gardens is a privately owned late 18th-century mansion on the Firth of Clyde near Inverkip, Scotland. Ardgowan is located in Inverclyde, in the former county of Renfrewshire. The Ardgowan Estate has been held by the Stewart family since the early 15th century: towards the end of that century, their tower house Ardgowan Castle was built within the site of the previous Inverkip Castle fortress. The present house was erected in 1797 and completed in 1801 from designs by Cairncross. It is the seat of the Shaw Stewart baronets, currently Sir Ludovic Houston Shaw Stewart, 12th Baronet of Greenock and Blackhall.

The house is protected as a category A listed building, and the grounds are included in the Inventory of Gardens and Designed Landscapes in Scotland, the national listing of significant gardens.

== History ==
In 1403, King Robert III granted the lands of Ardgowan to his natural son, Sir John Stewart. In 1667 Archibald Stewart was created a baronet. The 3rd baronet married, in 1730, Helen Houston, heiress of the Shaws of Greenock. Their son Sir John Shaw-Stewart, 4th baronet, commissioned a design for a new house from the architect Hugh Cairncross. Construction began in 1797, and was completed around 1801. The grounds were laid out to designs by James Ramsay from 1800.

In 1825 William Burn was appointed by the 6th baronet to extend the house. Sir Michael Shaw-Stewart, 7th Baronet and his wife Lady Octavia, daughter of the 2nd Marquess of Westminster, continued improvements to the grounds, employing their gardener brought from Eaton Hall, Cheshire to install formal gardens. In 1904 the 8th baronet commissioned Robert Lorimer to design the conservatory. Planting of new trees and shrubs continued until the Second World War, during which the house was employed as a hospital. The house remains home to the Shaw-Stewarts, and is also operated as a venue for rent.

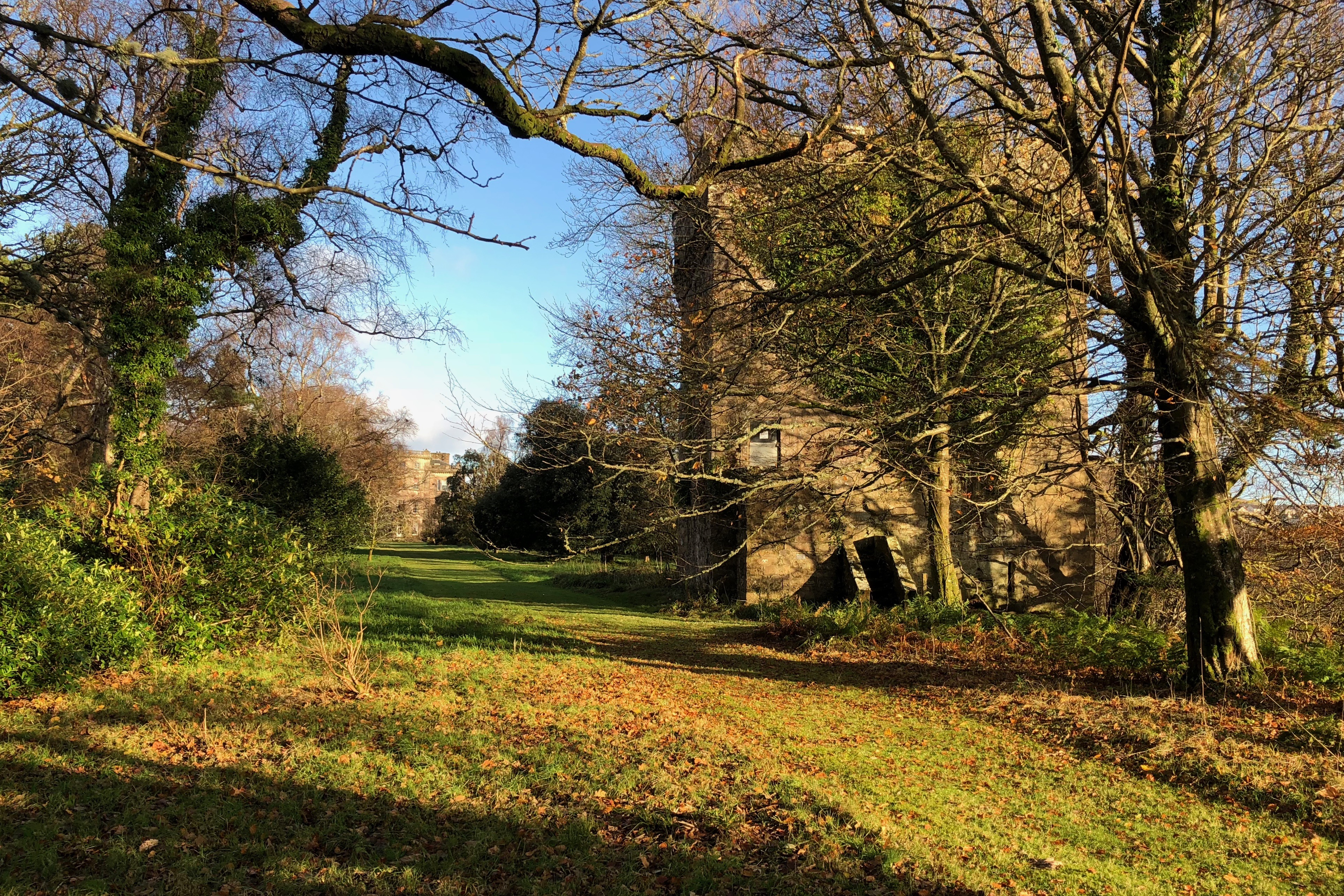
Ardgowan House seen from Private Gardens, with the 15th century Ardgowan Castle to the right

== The estate ==
The estate includes the remains of the 15th-century Ardgowan Castle, also known as Inverkip Castle. Only this tower house remains to mark the position of the old castle of Inverkip, which was a major fortress besieged by the forces of Edward I of England led by Earl of Ulster and his son-in-law Robert the Bruce, Earl of Carrick. The castle was then held by the English through the first part of what became known as the Scottish Wars of Independence. The three-story ruin is protected as a category B listed building.

The gothic Chapel of St Michael and All Angels, built in the mid-19th century, is also on the estate, but since 2010 it has lost its roof and is falling into ruin.

== In media ==
The house was in used in Ordeal by Innocence, a three-part BBC drama that was first broadcast during April 2018, and based on Agatha Christie's novel of the same name.

The house features in the episode "Fly Society" of the sitcom Still Game.

== See also ==
- List of Category A listed buildings in Inverclyde
- List of listed buildings in Inverkip, Inverclyde
