= Gourock =

Coastal town in Inverclyde, Scotland

Coordinates: 55.953763°N 4.8173176°W

Gourock: Scottish Gaelic: Guireag
- Town
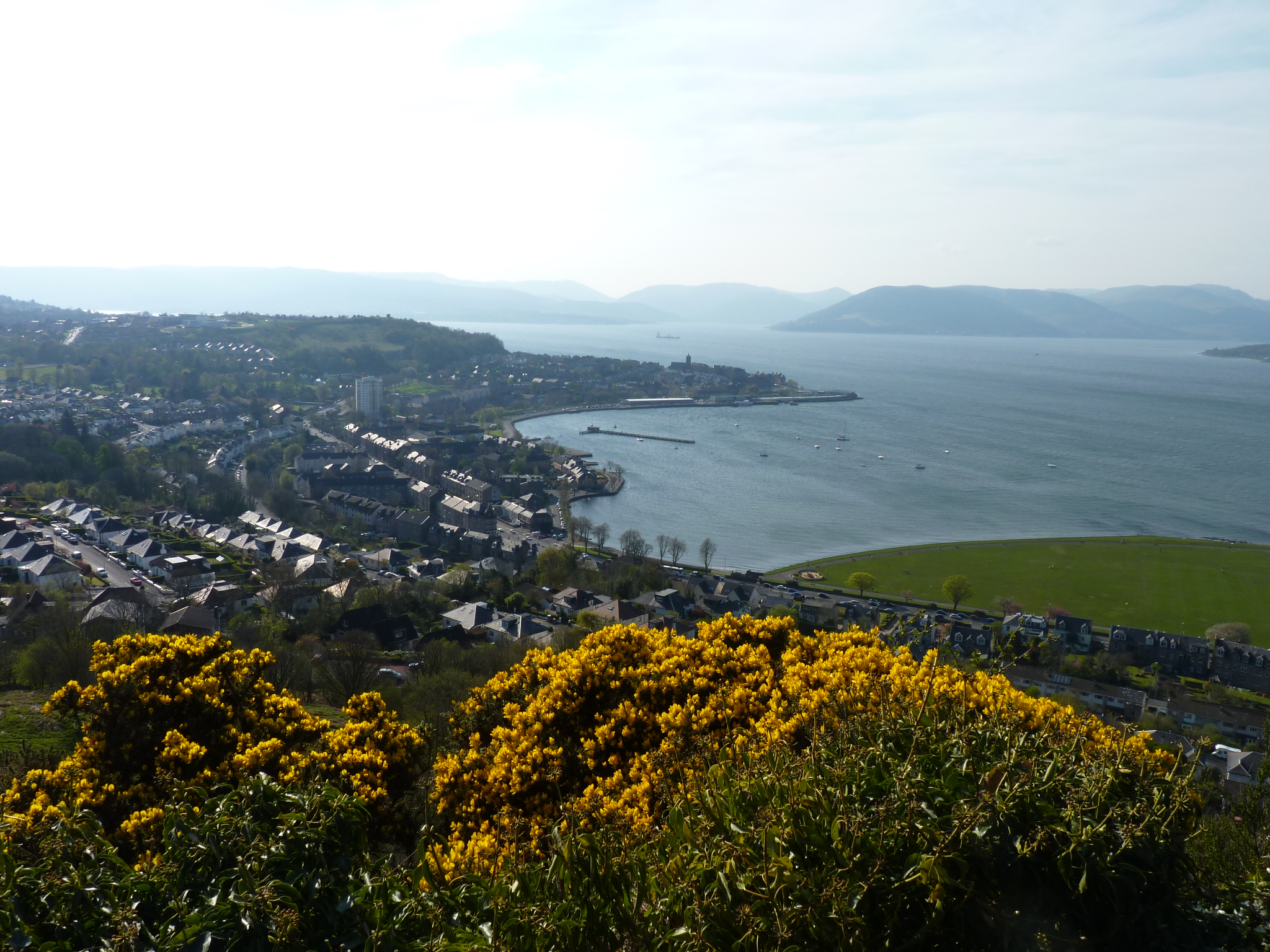
- Gourock Bay

- Location within Inverclyde
- Population: 10,210 (2020)
- OS grid reference: NS 24200 77000
- Council area: Inverclyde
- Lieutenancy area: Renfrewshire
- Country: Scotland
- Sovereign state: United Kingdom
- Post town: GOUROCK
- Postcode district: PA19
- Dialling code: 01475
- Police: Scotland
- Fire: Scottish
- Ambulance: Scottish
- UK Parliament: Inverclyde
- Scottish Parliament: Greenock and Inverclyde

Gourock (/ˈɡʊərək/ GOOR-ək; Scottish Gaelic: Guireag [ˈkuɾʲak]) is a town in the Inverclyde council area and formerly a burgh of the County of Renfrew in the west of Scotland. It was a seaside resort on the East shore of the upper Firth of Clyde. Its main function today is as a residential area, extending contiguously from Greenock, with a railway terminus and ferry services across the Clyde.

== History ==
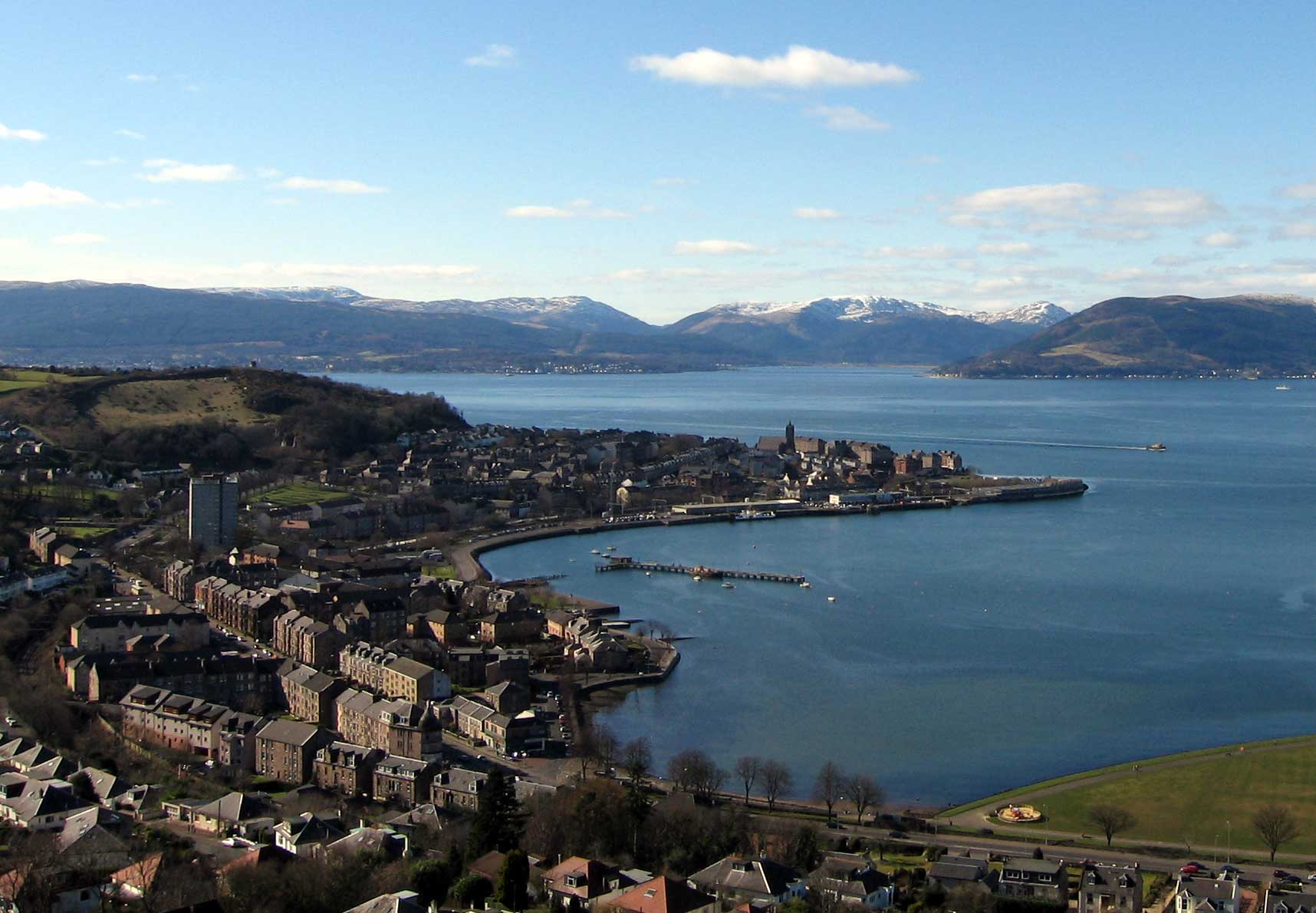
View from Lyle Hill over Cardwell Bay and Gourock Bay to the pierhead

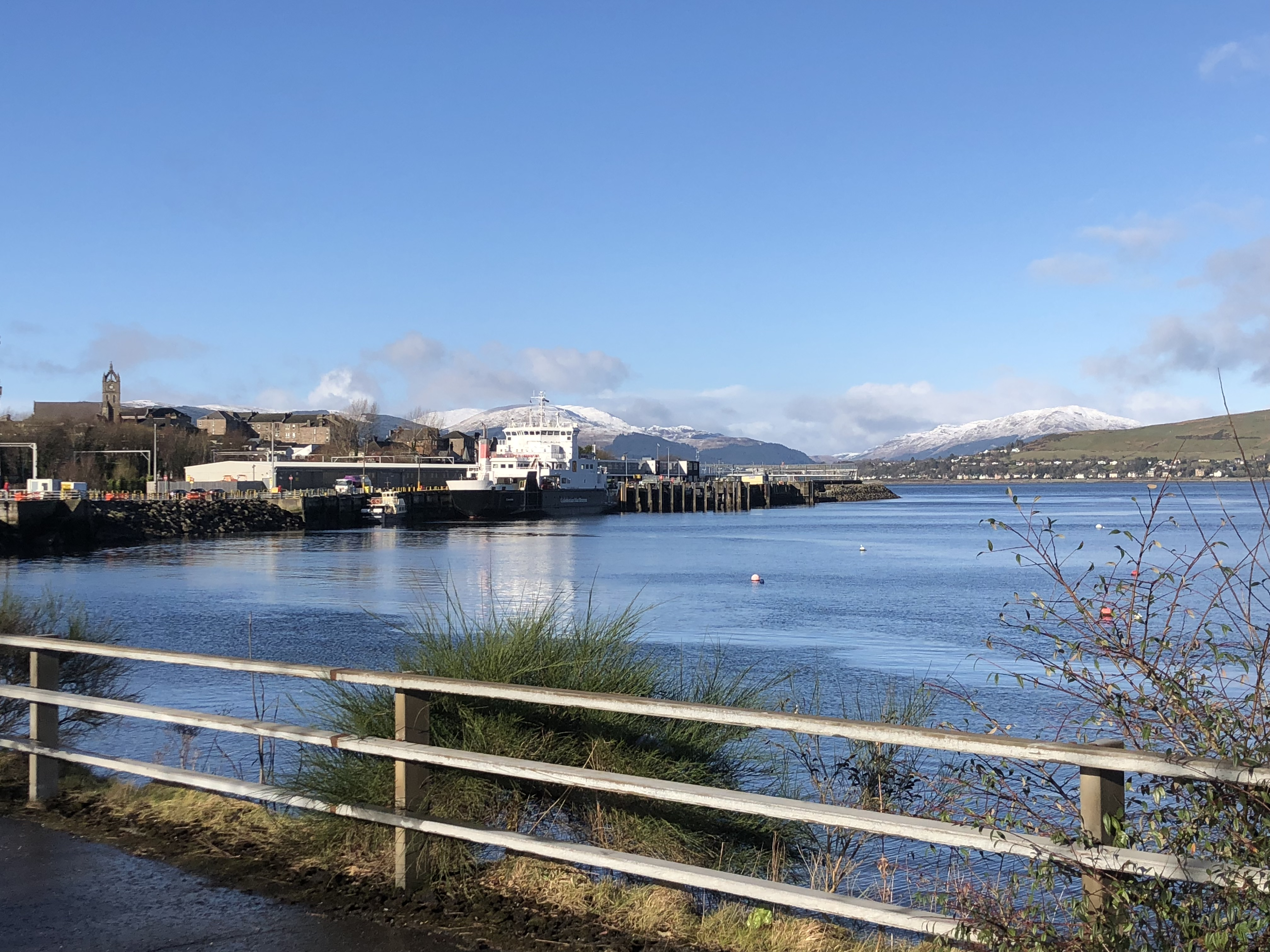
The crown steeple of St John's church on the skyline, CalMac ferry MV Coruisk at the pier next to CalMac headquarters.

The name Gourock comes from a Gaelic word for "pimple", in reference to the hill above the town. As far back as 1494 it is recorded that James IV sailed from the shore at Gourock to quell the rebellious Highland clans. Two hundred years later William and Mary granted a Charter in favour of Stewart of Castlemilk which raised Gourock to a Burgh of Barony. In 1784 the lands of Gourock were purchased by Duncan Darroch, a former merchant in Jamaica. He built Gourock House near the site of the castle in what the family eventually gifted to the town as Darroch Park, later renamed by the council as Gourock Park.

From a small fishing village in the traditional county of Renfrewshire, Gourock grew into a community involved in herring curing, copper mining, ropemaking, quarrying and latterly yacht-building and repairing. Within sight of Gourock, in the early hours of 21 October 1825, PS Comet (II) was run into by the steamer Ayr, some 62 people losing their lives.

When the competing railway companies extended their lines to provide fast connections to Clyde steamer services the Pierhead was built as a railway terminus. Nowadays a passenger ferry serves Kilcreggan and electric trains provide a service to Glasgow from Gourock railway station at the pierhead. The David MacBrayne Ltd headquarters is at the pier, and CalMac run a passenger ferry service to Dunoon. A car ferry service is run by Western Ferries from McInroy's Point on the west side of the town to Hunter's Quay to the north of Dunoon.

Like many Scottish seaside towns, Gourock's tourist heyday was in the latter half of the nineteenth century and the first half of the twentieth. Evidence of this part of its past is gradually disappearing - The Bay Hotel and Cragburn Pavilion and The Ashton, three local landmarks, disappeared towards the end of the last century. At the same time, Gourock has continued to expand along the coastline, with new estates above the medieval Castle Levan which has been restored and is in use as a bed and breakfast. Further development is taking place, though a short stretch of green belt still separates the town from the Cloch lighthouse which looks out over the firth to Innellan in Argyll.

== Places of interest ==
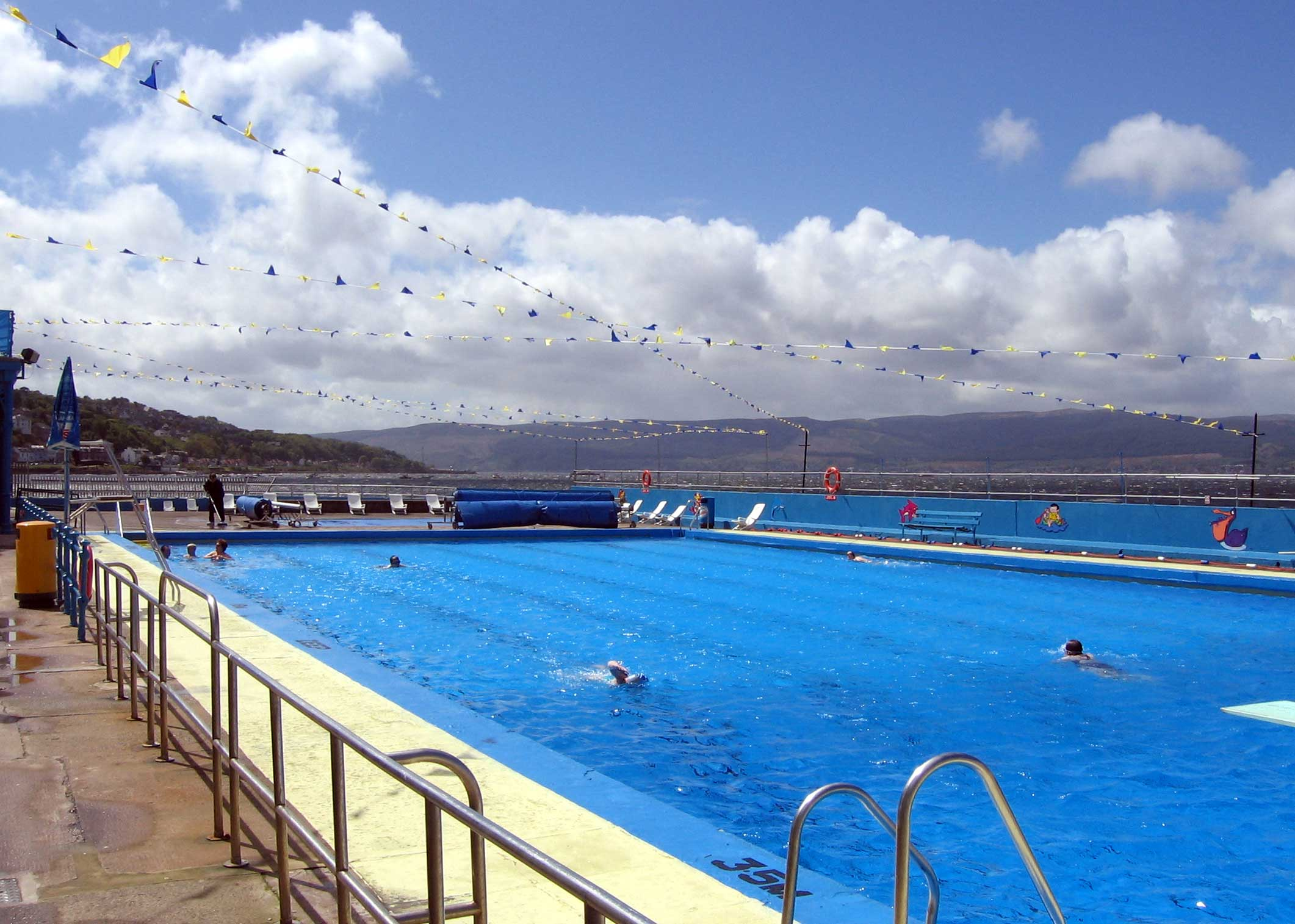
Gourock Outdoor Pool

Gourock has one of the three remaining public outdoor swimming pools in Scotland. Gourock Outdoor Pool was built in 1909 and reconstructed in 1969, it was once tidal and had a sandy floor, but is now a modern, heated facility, with cleaned sea water used in the saltwater pool. The pool was closed at the end of the 2010 summer season for a major improvement project, now completed. The existing changing accommodation was demolished and replaced with a more modern leisure centre, incorporating an enlarged gymnasium and lift access from the street level down to the new changing accommodation and the upgraded pool.

The megalithic Kempock Stone, popularly known as "Granny Kempock Stone", stands on a cliff behind Kempock Street. The superstition was that for sailors going on a long voyage or a couple about to be married, walking seven times around the stone would ensure good fortune. A flight of steps winds up from the street past the stone to Castle Mansions and St John's Church, whose crown steeple forms a landmark dominating Gourock.

Kempock Street is the main shopping street, and has a variety of shops including a small supermarket, art and gift shops, cafes, restaurants and pubs. At the north end of the street, a statue of a "Girl on a Suitcase" with bucket and spade at her side, popularly known as "Wee Annie", commemorates the town's past as a seaside resort and setting-off point. She looks out over the pier where Clyde steamers took holidaymakers "doon the watter". The statue was created by Angela Hunter as part of a public art project commissioned by Riverside Inverclyde in 2011.

Gourock also has a golf course, which stretches from behind Trumpethill to Levan estates. The Municipal Buildings in Shore Street, which are now used as a business centre, were completed in 1924.

== Yacht club ==
Royal Gourock Yacht Club
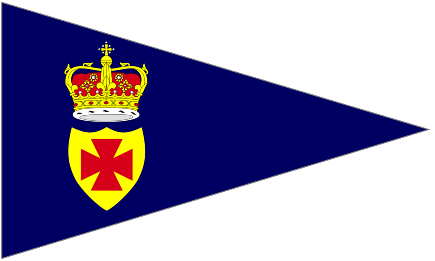
- Burgee

- Ensign
- Short name: RGYC
- Founded: 1894; 132 years ago
- Location: Gourock

Gourock has a large yacht club named the Royal Gourock Yacht Club. Situated on Ashton Road at the junction of Victoria Road, it was known as Gourock Sailing Club when it was founded in 1894. It became Gourock Yacht Club in 1900, and acquired Royal status in 1908.

== Clan Darroch ==
Clan Darroch's links with Gourock began in the later half of the 18th century with Duncan Darroch, 1st of Gourock, who had returned to Scotland after making a fortune in the West Indies. There is a story that as a lad, before leaving for Jamaica, he climbed into the garden of Gourock House to get apples from the orchard, and when chased out by the gardener said he would return to buy the estate with its orchard. He acquired the Barony of Gourock from the Stewarts of Castlemilk in 1784. He was also granted arms by the Court of the Lord Lyon and designated Chief of McIireich.

The present head of the Scottish clan Darroch is titled Claire Darroch-Thompson, 8th of Gourock, Lady of the Barony of Gourock, following the death of her father, the late Duncan Darroch of Gourock on 1 February 2011.

== Industry ==
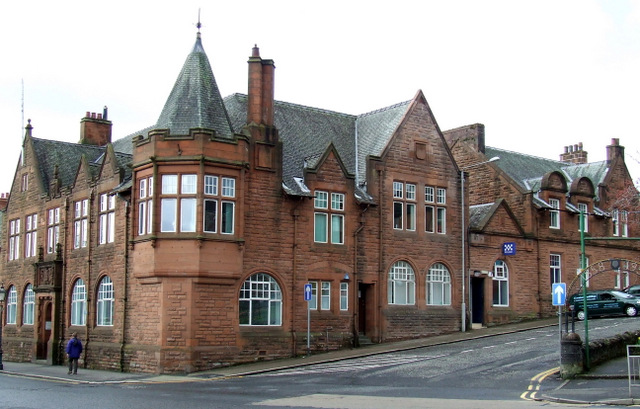
The Municipal Buildings

Gourock's principal industry, apart from tourism and fishing, was small craft repair and chandlery. An eponymous ropework opened in the town but later moved to Port Glasgow. More recently Amazon opened a distribution centre at Faulds Park, an industrial estate to the south of the town. The Amazon building was originally occupied by Mimtec who manufactured PC products in high volumes for IBM which closed in 2023.

== Geography ==
=== Ashton ===
The promenade at Ashton forms part of the Inverclyde Coastal Path.

=== McInroy's Point ===
McInroy's Point is a small peninsula to the west of the town. Around 1973, a pier was constructed here to form the departure point for Western Ferries. The port has since been expanded and now incorporates two floating ramps. The port is a terminus for the service to Hunters Quay, near Dunoon on the Cowal peninsula, on the western shore of the upper Firth of Clyde.

Preceding station	Ferry	Following station
Terminus	Western Ferries; Ferry	Hunters Quay

=== Midton ===
The area was the home of the Drumshantie Rifle Range in the late 19th century. It was developed in the mid-20th century as a series of prefabs (pre-fabricated houses) which were built on part of the "Tower Hill" as a temporary response to the post-war housing shortage.

=== Trumpethill ===
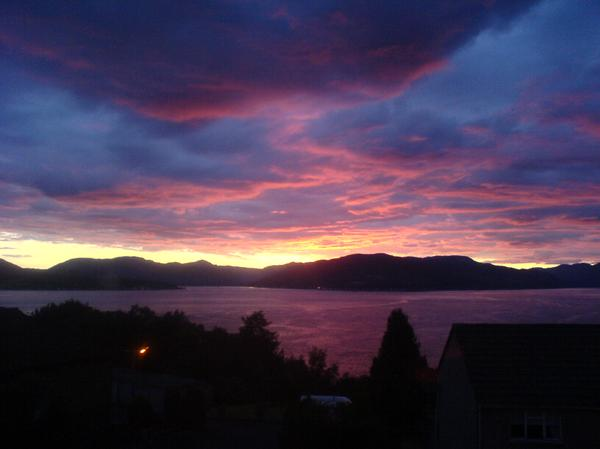
View looking onto the River Clyde from a house in Trumpethill

Trumpethill is a residential area situated between Midton and Levan and lies to the north of Gourock Golf Club, which stretches all the way behind to the back of Levan.

== Notable residents ==
- Iain Banks (1954–2013), author
- Charlie Barr (1864–1911), yachtsman and three-time America's Cup winner
- Nicky Low (1992– ) footballer
- Neil Munro (1863–1930), author
- Fiona Ritchie (1960– ), radio broadcaster
- William Somerville Shanks (1864–1951), artist
- Melissa Stribling (1926–1992), actress
- Sir Ernest Woodroofe (1912-2002), chairman of Unilever
- George Wyllie (1921–2012), artist

https://www.youtube.com/watch?v=Mrl0O_QXtwU
