= List of sugar refineries =

List of former and current notable sugar refineries

This is a list of notable sugar refineries. This include both sugarcane mills and refineries of sugar beets, and it includes current and former facilities, and some that are listed on historic registers.

== Australia ==
=== New South Wales ===
- Broadwater Sugar Mill
- Condong Sugar Mill
- Harwood Mill
- Tweed River Sugar Mill

=== Queensland ===
- Ageston sugar plantation
- Babinda Sugar Mill
- Bundaberg Sugar
- Central Sugar Mill Ruins
- CSR Refinery, New Farm
- Fairymead Sugar Plantation
- Farleigh Sugar Mill
- Inkerman Sugar Mill
- Isis Central Sugar Mill
- Kalamia Sugar Mill
- Millaquin sugar mill
- Moreton Central Sugar Mill
- Mossman Central Mill
- Mulgrave Sugar Mill
- Oaklands Sugar Mill
- Ormiston House Estate
- Pioneer Sugar Mill
- Plane Creek Sugar Mill
- Pleystowe Sugar Mill
- Racecourse Mill
- Yengarie Sugar Refinery Ruins

=== Victoria ===
- CSR Refinery, Yarravillem Yarraville, Maribyrnong, (1872 to 1980s), also known as Colonial Sugar Refining Company Refinery of Yarraville.

== Bangladesh ==
- Joypurhat Sugar Mill
- Mobarakganj Sugar Mills Limited
- North Bengal Sugar Mills
- Pabna Sugar Mill
- Shyampur Sugar Mills

== Canada ==
- Redpath Sugar Refinery (1958), sugar storage, refining and museum complex in Toronto, Ontario

== China ==
- Guangxi Guitang Group
- Taikoo Sugar Refinery (1881), Hong Kong

== Cuba ==
- Camilo Cienfuegos (Santa Cruz del Norte), Hershey

== Denmark ==
- Amaliegade 4, Copenhagen
- Andreas Bjørn House, Copenhagen
- Behagen House, Copenhagen
- Holm House, Copenhagen
- Knabrostræde 3, Copenhagen
- Nyhavn 11, Copenhagen
- Rådhusstræde 3, Copenhagen
- Højbygaard Sugar Factory, Holeby, Lolland

== Dominican Republic ==
- Engombe Sugar Mill, Santo Domingo Oeste municipality, Santo Domingo province, 1500s, UNESCO World Heritage-listed
- Nigua Sugar Mill, World Heritage tentative list

== Fiji ==
- Penang (Rakiraki) Sugar Mill
- Viria Sugar Mill

== Germany ==
- Zuckerraffinerie Braunschweig

== India ==
- Ghodganga Sugar Factory, near Pune, in Maharashtra
- Cooperative sugar factories in Maharashtra
- Godavari Biorefineries

== Indonesia ==
Cane sugar mills and sugar refinery are commonly known as pabrik gula in Indonesian and abbreviated as PG. The private (partikulir) and state-owned cane sugar mill and sugar refinery in Indonesia began to emerge after the start of the era of liberalism during the Dutch East Indies colonial period (1870), with the introduction of Land Lease Rights for use for 70 years. Previously, a number of simple sugar factories had been established to process the sugar cane harvest, which was included in the commodities included in the Cultuurstelsel program. Most Dutch East Indies colonial cane sugar mill and sugar refinery located in Java, hence it rises such popular culture such as in Sugar Mill, an Indonesian supernatural horror film.

Note: the list of sugar factories below is not perfect. If you find any errors in the following data, please help Wikipedia by expanding it. Thank you.

=== Java ===
==== East Java ====
Factory Name	Status	District / City	Description	Images
Asembagus Sugar Factory	Active	Situbondo		Asembagoes steam locomotive at sugar cane
Panji Sugar Factory	Active	Situbondo		Sugar factory at the Pandji company near Kapongan near Sitoebondo
Olean Sugar Factory	Active	Situbondo		A bucket or rake carrier, manufactured in 1930 and intended for the Olean Sugar Factory. Part of the binder with photos of machines from the N.V. Machinefabriek Braat in Soerabaja, Soekaboemi and Jogyakarta, from the period 1908-1942.
Wringinanom Sugar Factory	Active	Situbondo		Ducroo Dn2t owned by Wringinanom Sugar Factory
de Maas Sugar Factory	Inactive	Situbondo		Sugar factory De Maas at Besuki, East Java - circa 1910.
Prajekan Sugar Factory	Active	Bondowoso		
Tangarang Sugar Factory	Inactive	Bondowoso		The sugar factory 'Tangarang' (established in 1893) in the area of Bondowoso in East Java
Sukowidi Sugar Factory	Inactive	Banyuwangi		Research into diseased sugar cane in the Glagah department of the Soekowidi sugar factory north of Banjoewangi
Glenmore Sugar Industry	Active	Banyuwangi		
Kalirejo Sugar Factory	Defunct	Banyuwangi		Kaliredjo sugar mill near Banyuwangi, East Java
Bedadung Sugar Factory	Inactive	Jember		Cooling installation manufactured in 1929 and intended for the Bedadoeng sugar factory. Part of the binder with photos of machines from the N.V. Machinefabriek Braat in Surabaya intended for the Dutch sugar industry on Java, from the period 1917-1938.
Semboro Sugar Factory	Active	Jember		Name board of Semboro Sugar Mill
Gunungsari Sugar Factory	Inactive	Jember		SF. Goenoengsari sugar mill near Jember, East Java
Paiton Sugar Factory	Active	Probolinggo		
Kandangjati Sugar Factory	Inactive	Probolinggo		Kandang Djati sugar mill near Kraksaan, Probolinggo
Bagu Sugar Factory	Deactivated	Probolinggo		Sugar company Bagoe, near Kraksaan, residence Surabaya
Pajarekan Sugar Factory	Active	Probolinggo		Transport of a cooking pan on a trailer behind a truck. Manufactured in 1926 in Surabaya and intended for the Padjarakan Sugar Factory. Part of the binder with photos of machines from the N.V. Machinefabriek Braat in Soerabaja, Soekaboemi and Jogyakarta, from the period 1908-1942.
Maron Sugar Factory	Inactive	Probolinggo		Presentation of medals for long-term service at the Maron Sugar Company of the Colonial Bank
Gending Sugar Factory	Active	Probolinggo		'Native Hospital' Gending of the Sugar Factory, East Java Native hospital sugar Gending, East Java, c. 1925
Wonoaseh Sugar Factory	Inactive	Probolinggo		
Wonolangan Sugar Factory	Active	Probolinggo		Wonolangan sugar factory, in Probolinggo
Umbul Sugar Factory	Inactive	Probolinggo		Cast steel gear for crusher installation, manufactured in 1932 and intended for the Oemboel Sugar Factory. Part of the binder with photos of machines from the N.V. Machinefabriek Braat in Surabaya intended for the Dutch sugar industry on Java, from the period 1917-1938.
Sumberkareng Sugar Factory	Inactive	Probolinggo		Soemberkareng sugar mill in Probolinggo
Jatiroto Sugar Factory	Active	Lumajang		Aerial view of Djatiroto sugar mill in Lumadjang
Kedawung Sugar Factory	Active	Pasuruan		Pasoeroean The Kedawoeng sugar factory has started the campaign
Bekasi Oost Sugar Factory	Inactive	Pasuruan		
Gayam Sugar Factory	Inactive	Pasuruan		
de Goede Hoop Sugar Factory	Deactivated	Pasuruan		
Pleret Sugar Factory	Inactive	Pasuruan		
Wonorejo Sugar Factory	Deactivated	Pasuruan		Attentive audience for the administrator's speech during the milling festival of the Wonoredjo sugar factory southwest of Pasoeroean
Sumberrejo Sugar Factory	Inactive	Pasuruan		
Arjosarie Sugar Factory	Inactive	Pasuruan		
Pandaan Sugar Factory	Inactive	Pasuruan		
Kantjil Mas Sugar Factory	Inactive	Pasuruan		
Sukorejo Sugar Factory	Inactive	Pasuruan		The depot for steam locomotives of the State Railways at the Soekoredjo sugar factory
Alkmaar Sugar Factory	Inactive	Pasuruan		
Kebonagung Sugar Factory	Active	Malang		
Sempalwadak Sugar Factory	Inactive	Malang		Versatile plow with crawler tractor on uneven terrain, Sempalwadak sugar company
Krebet Sugar Factory	Active	Malang		Krebet sugar factory south of Malang
Panggoengredjo Sugar Factory	Inactive	Malang		In the sugar factory in Panggoengredjo, south of Blitar
Porong Sugar Factory	Inactive	Sidoarjo		
Tanggulangin Sugar Factory	Inactive	Sidoarjo		Aerial view of the area between Tanggoelangin Sugar Factory, Kloedan, Kepadangan and Boelang on East Java
Candi Sugar Factory	Active	Sidoarjo		
Sruni Sugar Factory	Inactive	Sidoarjo		
Buduran Sugar Factory	Inactive	Sidoarjo		Administrateurshuis en kantoor van suikerfabriek Boedoeran te Sidoardjo, KITLV 18358.tiff
Waru Sugar Factory	Inactive	Sidoarjo		
Ketegan Sugar Factory	Inactive	Sidoarjo		The Ketegan sugar factory near Surabaya
Krian Sugar Factory	Deactivated	Sidoarjo		
Balong Bendo Sugar Factory	Inactive	Sidoarjo		The bayonet frame for a mill machine, manufactured in 1930 and intended for the Balong Bendo Sugar Factory in East Java. Part of the binder with photos of machines from the N.V. Machinefabriek Braat in Soerabaja, Soekaboemi and Jogyakarta, from the period 1908-1942.
Watutulis Sugar Factory	Inactive	Sidoarjo		Factory of sugar company Watoetoelis near Krijan (Krian), west of Sidoardjo
Seruni Sugar Factory	Deactivated	Sidoarjo		
Tulangan Sugar Factory	Inactive	Sidoarjo		Aerial view of Toelangan sugar factory in East Java
Krembung Sugar Factory	Deactivated	Sidoarjo		Sugar factory PG Kremboong, owned by PTPN X
Sedatie Sugar Factory	Inactive	Mojokerto		
Koning Willem II Sugar Factory	Inactive	Mojokerto		Koning Willem II (King William II) sugar factory east of Modjokerto with the transport chute on the right that takes the sugar cane to the mills
Ketanen Sugar Factory	Inactive	Mojokerto		Sugar company Ketanen at Modjokerto during the renovation
Pohjejer Sugar Factory	Inactive	Mojokerto		
Dinoyo Sugar Factory	Inactive	Mojokerto		Locomotive No. 2 Dinojo in front of a field with sisal plantings, probably near the Dinojo sugar factory south of Mojokerto
Sumengko Sugar Factory	Deactivated	Mojokerto		
Tangunan Sugar Factory	Inactive	Mojokerto		
Brangkal Sugar Factory	Inactive	Mojokerto		Gully plow with tractor, Brangkal Sugar Company
Bangsal Sugar Factory	Deactivated	Mojokerto		
Perning Sugar Factory	Deactivated	Mojokerto		Aanvoer van suikerriet op de suikerfabriek Perning bij Modjokerto, KITLV 7731
Gempolkerep Sugar Factory	Active	Mojokerto		Diema DD6-2, a rail car at the Gempolkrep sugar factory train yard
Sentanen Lor Sugar Factory	Inactive	Mojokerto		Sentanen Lor sugar factory near Mojokerto
Sukodono Sugar Factory	Inactive	Jombang		'Soekodono' sugar factory around 1880 with a reference to 'Mr. W. A. Baron Baud', who died in 1879.
Sumobito Sugar Factory	Inactive	Jombang		
Peterongan Sugar Factory	Inactive	Jombang		Factory building of the Peterongan sugar factory near Djombang
Mojoagong Sugar Factory	Inactive	Jombang		
Selorejo Sugar Factory	Inactive	Jombang		A sugar factory with the inscription Seloredjo above the columned entrance and the year 1882 in Roman numerals below. A chimney pipe on the left of the factory. In front of the factory a lawn with four ox carts and a tractor. A native on each ox-drawn cart, a European on the tractor. Part of the photo album presented by the Soerabayasche Vereeniging van Suikerfabrikanten to Frederik Beyerinck, resident of Surabaya.
Cukir Sugar Factory	Active	Jombang		Locomotive named Theo, built by Orenstein & Koppel, probably at the Tjoekir sugar factory south of Jombang
Blimbing Sugar Factory	Inactive	Jombang		Blimbing sugar factory, location at south of Jombang
Ceweng Sugar Factory	Inactive	Jombang		
Gudo Sugar Factory	Deactivated	Jombang		Aerial view of Goedo sugar mill near Jombang
Jombang Sugar Factory	Active	Jombang		
Ponen Sugar Factory	Inactive	Jombang		De suikerfabriek Ponen (Ponen sugar factory)
Ngelom Sugar Factory	Inactive	Jombang		
Keningo Sugar Factory	Inactive	Blitar		
Garum Sugar Factory	Inactive	Blitar		
Rejoso Manis Indo Sugar Factory	Active	Blitar		
Sumberdadi Sugar Factory	Off	Blitar		
Kunir Sugar Factory	Inactive	Blitar		
Merican Sugar Factory	Active	Kediri		COLLECTIE TROPENMUSEUM Luchtfoto van de suikerfabriek Meritjan ten noorden van Kediri Java
Pesantren Lama Sugar Factory	Inactive	Kediri	Merged and in the area of PG Pesantren Baru	Housing for European employees of the Pesantren sugar factory near Kediri
Pesantren Baru Sugar Factory	Active	Kediri		Rear part of the factory building, with probably centrifuges for drying sugar on the left, of the Nieuw Pesantren sugar factory near Kediri
Ngadirejo Sugar Factory	Active	Kediri		Aerial view of Ngadiredjo sugar factory in Kediri
Minggiran Sugar Factory	Inactive	Kediri		Factory of sugar company Minggiran near Kediri
Menang Sugar Factory	Inactive	Kediri		Interior with three European women in conversation of a European home at the Menang Sugar Factory east of Kediri
Bogokidul Sugar Factory	Inactive	Kediri		
Kawarasan Sugar Factory	Deactivated	Kediri		
Tegowangi Sugar Factory	Inactive	Kediri		Willy (2nd from right) and Harry Hirsch (10th from right) at a farewell dinner, probably at Kediri, for D.J. de Zwart, administrator of the Tegowangi sugar factory (presumably 1st from the right) Aerial view of Tegowangi sugar mill
Kencong Sugar Factory	Inactive	Kediri		Factory of sugar company Kentjong in Pare
Badas Sugar Factory	Inactive	Kediri		Badas sugar factory northeast of Kediri
Purwoasri Sugar Factory	Inactive	Kediri	former land converted into Purwoasri Bus Terminal	
Mojopanggung Sugar Factory	Active	Tulungagung		Bridge with railway line for the transport of sugar, probably at the Modjopanggoong sugar company near Kediri
Lestari Sugar Factory	Active	Nganjuk		
Juwono Sugar Factory	Inactive	Nganjuk		
Jati Sugar Factory	Inactive	Nganjuk		
Nganjuk Sugar Factory	Inactive	Nganjuk		Aerial view of Ngandjoek sugar factory on Java. SF. Nganjuk Aerial photo (title on object)
Baron Sugar Factory	Deactivated	Nganjuk		
Kujonmanis Sugar Factory	Inactive	Nganjuk		
Rejoagung Sugar Factory	Active	Madiun		
Kanigoro Sugar Factory	Inactive	Madiun		Java Steam Loco, Borsig no 1 owned by Kanigoro sugar mill
Pagotan Sugar Factory	Active	Madiun		Tank storage area for P.C.M.C. molasses on the site of the Pagottan sugar factory in East Java
Rejosari Sugar Factory	Active	Magetan		Two preheaters intended for Suikerfabriek Padokan and five cooling troughs intended for Suikerfabriek Redjosari, manufactured in 1926. Part of the binder with photos of machines of the N.V. Machinefabriek Braat in Soerabaja intended for the Dutch sugar industry on Java, from the period 1917-1938.
Purwodadi Sugar Factory	Active	Magetan		Poerwodadi sugar mill near Magetan, East Java
Sudono Sugar Factory	Active	Ngawi		Steam loco (decauville) at PG Soedhono Sugar Mill
Wringin Agung Sugar Factory	Inactive	Tuban		
Kebonharjo Sugar Factory	Inactive	Tuban		

==== Surakarta–Yogyakarta ====
Factory Name	Status	District / City	Description	Images
Mojo Sugar Factory	Active	Sragen	Operating as sugar factory since 1883. Nationalised in 1959.	Modjo sugar mill near Sragen
Kedungbanteng	Abandoned	Sragen	Operating as sugar factory in 1926–1932. Most buildings were abandoned, but some reused as subdistrict office.	
Tasikmadu	Inactive	Karanganyar	Operating as sugar factory in 1871–2021. Active for agrotourism since 2005.	Tasikmadoe sugar mill near Karanganyar, Central Java
Colomadu	Inactive	Karanganyar	Operating as sugar factory in 1861–1998. Reopened as a Museum since 2018.	PG Tjolomadoe Sugar Mill museum at Solo, Central Java
Kartasura (Gembongan)	Inactive	Sukoharjo	Operating in 1890–1930. Reopened as tourism area since 2020.	Kartasoera sugar mill near Surakarta
Bangak Sugar Factory	Abandoned	Boyolali	Reused for tobacco company, while remaining buildings are abandoned.	Adminstrateurswoning suikerfabriek Bangak - Solo., KITLV 1405354
Wonosari Sugar Factory	Abandoned	Klaten	Closed in 1929. Most buildings have been razed and rebuilt into private housings.	Evaporator body and three cooking pans, manufactured in 1925 and intended for the Goedo, Wonosarie, Randoe Goenting and Manishardjo sugar factories. Part of the binder with photos of machines from the N.V. Machinefabriek Braat in Surabaya intended for the Dutch sugar industry on Java, from the period 1917-1938.
Cokrotulung Sugar Factory	Abandoned	Klaten	Operating in 1840–1942. Rebuilt into market (Pasar Cokro).	Factory building of sugar company Tjokro-Toeloeng (Cokrotulung) near Delanggu northeast of Surakarta
Ponggok Sugar Factory	Abandoned	Klaten	Abandoned. Rebuilt into residential area.	Factory of sugar company Ponggok near Delanggu in the Vorstenlanden
Delanggu Sugar Factory	Inactive	Klaten	Operating as sugar factory in 1917–34. Repurposed into gunny sack factory and operating in 1934–1968.	
Ceper	Inactive	Klaten	Operating in 1863–1998.	Tjepper sugar factory in Klaten, Central Java
Manisharjo Sugar Factory	Abandoned	Klaten	Operating in 1901–44. Razed and rebuilt into residential area.	Sugar dryer manufactured in 1917 for the Manishardjo Sugar Factory northeast of Klaten on Java. Part of the binder with photos of machines from the N.V. Machinefabriek Braat in Surabaya intended for the Dutch sugar industry on Java, from the period 1917-1938.
Gedaren Sugar Factory	Abandoned	Klaten	Razed during Operation Kraai and repurposed as market and community healthcare center.	Factory and ampasplein of indigo and sugar company Gedaren near Klaten
Karang Anom Sugar Factory	Abandoned	Klaten	Operating in 1840–1930s. Razed and built as residential area.	Sugar company Karang Anom Djoengkere near Surakarta
Gondang Winangun	Inactive	Klaten	Built in 1860, stopped production in 2017. The sugar museum was built in 1982 and is in operation since. Started agrotourism since 2009.	Gondang Winangoen Sugar Museum
Prambonan	Abandoned	Klaten		
Randu Gunting–Candi Sewu (Prambanan)	Abandoned	Klaten– Sleman	Built as indigo processing factory in ±1870. Converted into sugar factory in ±1900, closed in 1934. Destroyed in Operation Kraai.	Randoe Goenting–Tjandi Sewoe sugar factory in southwest of Klaten
Klaci	Abandoned	Sleman	Built in 1886. Demolished and repurposed as public school (SMK N 1 Godean).	
Tanjung Tirto	Abandoned	Sleman	Operating in 1874–1933. Demolished during Indonesian National Revolution. Several remaining building repurposed as public school (SMP 1 Berbah) and police station.	Sugar factory with sugar cane in Tandjong Tirto, Jogjakarta
Demak Ijo	Abandoned	Sleman	Operating as sugar factory in 1912–33. Demolished.	View of the Demak Idjo sugar factory, boiler house and workshops
Cebongan Sugar Factory	Abandoned	Sleman	Opened in 1886. Razed in Operation Kraai. Repurposed as market, storage, community healthcare center (Puskesmas Mlati II), subdistrict office, schools, and residential area.	The Tjebongan sugar factory in the vicinity of Yogyakarta. The name and date 1879 on the factory building. Part of the photo album presented to J.M. Pijnacker Hordijk on his departure from Jogyakarta in 1886.
Beran	Abandoned	Sleman	Demolished and repurposed into several Sleman government building and regency field.	
Medari	Abandoned	Sleman	Operating in 1908–1948/9. Demolished and repurposed into textile factory Primissima (1971–2024/5).	The staff of the 'Inlandsche Ziekenverpleging' of Suiker Onderneming Medarie Yogyakarta.
Sendang Pitu Sugar Factory	Abandoned	Sleman	Operating in 1922–31. Destroyed by Japanese bombing in 1943. Demolished into Sendangrejo village field with a section of ruin.	
Kedaton Pleret	Abandoned	Bantul	Operating in 1862–1937. Demolished into Sultan Agung field.	The Kedaton Pleret sugar factory, southeast of Yogyakarta decorated for the milling festival
Madukismo, formerly Padokan	Active	Bantul	Established in 1864 by George Lodewijk Weijnschenk as Suikerfabriek Padokan. Reestablished in 1955 after the Indonesian National Revolution as Madukismo.	Rail system at Madukismo Sugar Mill Aerial photo of Padokan sugar mill
Wonocatur Sugar Factory	Abandoned	Bantul	Operating in 1905–1937. Later became part of Air Force Maguwo Airstrip which constructed in 1940. Site repurposed as Air Force Central Museum "Dirgantara Mandala" since 1982.	
Bantul Sugar Factory	Abandoned	Bantul	Demolished. Site repurposed as several government buildings and schools.	
Barongan	Abandoned	Bantul	Operating in ±1867–1937. Demolished. Site repurposed as provincial animal diagnostics office (Laboratorium Kesehatan Hewan dan Kesehatan Masyarakat Veteriner).	Suikerfabriek Barongan (KITLV)
Gondanglipuro	Abandoned	Bantul	Demolished. Site repurposed as other businesses.	
Pundong Sugar Factory	Abandoned	Bantul	Demolished. Site repurposed as provincial disability rehabilitation center (Balai Rehabilitasi Terpadu Penyandang Disabilitas).	Packaging sugar in the Poendong sugar factory near Yogyakarta
Gesikan Sugar Factory	Abandoned	Bantul	Demolished. Site repurposed as provincial agricultural seeding center (Balai Pengembangan Perbenihan dan Pengawasan Mutu Benih Tanaman Pertanian).	
Rewulu	Abandoned	Bantul	Operating in 1889–1930s. Demolished after fire in 1940s. Site repurposed as provincial police headquarter.	Factory of the sugar company Rewoeloe near Djokjakarta.
Sedayu	Abandoned	Bantul	Site repurposed as wet market (Pasar Mbabrik).	
Sewugalur	Abandoned	Kulon Progo	Operating in 1881–1935. Razed during Operation Kraai.	Official home of Sewooegaloor sugar factory employees

==== Central Java ====
Factory Name	Status	District / City	Description	Images
Jenar Sugar Factory	Inactive	Purworejo		
Rembun Sugar Factory	Inactive	Kebumen		Aerial view of Remboen sugar mill
Klampok Sugar Factory	Inactive	Banjarnegara		Packing room in Klampok sugar factory, the first electric one, east of Banjoemas, KITLV 29091
Bojong Sugar Factory	Disabled	Purbalingga		The bridge over the Klawing river, also the railway bridge of the Bodjong sugar factory
Kalirejo Sugar Factory	Inactive	Banyumas		
Kalibagor Sugar Factory	Inactive	Banyumas	Operating in 1839–1933. Converted to garment factory	The steam tram with locomotive is ready for sugar transport at the Kalibagor sugar company.
Purwokerto Sugar Factory	Inactive	Banyumas		Suikerfabriek Poerwokerto near Banyumas
Pakis Sugar Factory New	Active	Pati		
Trangkil Sugar Factory	Active	Pati		Train yard of Trangkil sugar mill
Langse Sugar Factory	Inactive	Pati		
Tanjung Mojo Sugar Factory	Inactive	Kudus		Tandjong-Modjo sugar mill (also called Ngablak) in Tandjoengmodjo near Koedoes
Rendeng Sugar Factory	Active	Kudus		Rendeng sugar mill train depot
Besito Sugar Factory	Inactive	Kudus		
Mayong Sugar Factory	Inactive	Jepara		
Pecangaan Sugar Factory	Inactive	Jepara		
Banyuputih Sugar Factory	Inactive	Jepara		
Kaliwungu Sugar Factory	Inactive	Kendal		The Kaliwoengoe sugar mill west of Semarang in 1905
Gemuh Sugar Factory	Inactive	Kendal		Train of the Semarang-Cheribon Stoomtram Maatschappij (SCS) amid the reed gardens of the Gemoeh sugar factory near Kendal
Cepiring Sugar Factory	Inctive	Kendal		Administrators' House at Tjepiring Sugar Factory
Puguh Sugar Factory	Inactive	Kendal		
Kalimati Sugar Factory	Inactive	Batang		
Klidang Sugar Factory	Inactive	Batang		
Wonopringgo Sugar Factory	Inactive	Pekalongan		Mountains of limestone for the Wonopringgo sugar factory southwest of Pekalongan
Tirto Sugar Factory	Inactive	Pekalongan		Tirto Sugar Mill
Sragi Sugar Factory	Active	Pekalongan		A steam locomotive previously owned by the Sragie Sugar Factory has now changed ownership in England.
Comal Baru Sugar Factory	Inactive	Pemalang		Tjomal Baroe Sugar Mill, taken from train
Comal Sugar Factory	Inactive	Pemalang		View of the sugar factory buildings. Part of the photo album of the Tjomal sugar mill in the period ca. 1900-1919.
Petarukan Sugar Factory	Inactive	Pemalang		Train yard of the tram line of the Petaroekan sugar factory near Pemalang
Banjardawa Sugar Factory	Inactive	Pemalang		Sugar Mill of Bandjardawa at 1888
Sumberharjo Sugar Factory	Inactive	Pemalang		Water collection at Tjipero from the Ramboet irrigation area of the Soemberhardjo sugar mill near Pemalang
Balapulang Sugar Factory	Inactive	Tegal		The railway emplacement of the Balapoelang sugar factory. A lorry is a small non-powered rail vehicle intended for freight transport on industrial or agricultural (narrow) railway lines
Dukuhwringin Sugar Factory	Inactive	Tegal		
Pangkah Sugar Factory	Inactive	Tegal		Pangka Sugar refinery Java 19th c.
Kemantran Sugar Factory	Inactive	Tegal		Steam Train at Kemantran Sugar Mill
Pagongan Sugar Factory	Inactive	Tegal		Aerial view of Pagongan Sugar Mill in Tagal
Adiwerna Sugar Factory	Inactive	Tegal		Sugar dryer manufactured in 1932 for the Adiwerna Sugar Factory, south of Tegal
Kemanglen Sugar Factory	Inactive	Tegal		Kemanglen Sugar Factory in 1870-1875, Lithography based on a painting by Abraham Salm.
Maribaya Sugar Factory	Inactive	Tegal		
Kedjambon Sugar Factory	Inactive	Tegal		A note stating that Tan Kok Kiem was the owner of the Kedjambon Sugar Factory was listed in the book "Regerings-almanac for Nederlandsch-Indië, 1875."
Jatibarang Sugar Factory	Inactive	Brebes	In the process of being revitalized to become the Steam Locomotive Museum	The administrator house in the Jatibarang sugar mill.
Banjaratma	Abandoned	Brebes	Operating as sugar factory in 1913–1998. Repurposed as Banjaratma Heritage Rest Area KM 260 of Trans-Java Toll Road since 2019.	Bandjaratma Sugar Mill
Lemahabang Sugar Factory	Inactive	Brebes		
Ketanggungan Barat Sugar Factory (Kersana Sugar Factory)	Inactive	Brebes		Afkoelingsinstallatie van suikerfabriek Ketanggoengan-West ten zuidwesten van Brebes, KITLV 18216

==== West Java ====
Factory Name	Status	District / City	Description	Images
New Losari Sugar Factory	Inactive	Cirebon		
Tersana Baru	Active	Cirebon	Operating since 1905.	Nieuw Tersana sugar mill
Luwung Gajah Sugar Factory	Inactive	Cirebon		Pesaleman water pumping station with temporary aqueduct at the Loewoeng-Gadjah sugar factory southeast of Cirebon
Jatipiring Sugar Factory	Inactive	Cirebon		
Karangsuwung	Inactive	Cirebon	Operating in 1854–2014.	Karang Soewoeng Sugar Mill in 1927
Sindanglaut	Active	Cirebon	Operating in 1872–2020 and reoperating since 2023.	Aerial view of Sindanglaoet sugar mill
Surawinangun Sugar Factory	Inactive	Cirebon		The 'Soerawinangoen' sugar factory near Plumbon
Gempol Sugar Factory	Inactive	Cirebon		Semarang-Cheribon Train, in the background the Gempol sugar factory.
Arjawinangun Sugar Factory	Inactive	Cirebon		
Parungjaya Sugar Factory	Inactive	Majalengka		Paroengdjaja sugar factory northeast of Madjalengka
Jatiwangi Sugar Factory	Inactive	Majalengka		Sugar company Djatiwangi near Indramayu
Kadipaten Sugar Factory	Inactive	Majalengka		Aerial view of Kadhipaten sugar factory, north of Majalengka

=== Kalimantan & Lesser Sunda Islands ===
Name of sugar factory	Status	District / City	Description
Pelaihari Sugar Factory	Disabled	Tanah Laut Regency	Converted to palm oil factory
PT. Muria Sumba Manis	Active	East Sumba Regency	

=== Sulawesi ===
Name of sugar factory	Status	District/City	Description
Bone Sugar Factory	Active	Bone	
Camming Sugar Factory (Arasoe)	Active	Bone	
Takalar Sugar Factory	Active	Takalar	
Bombana Sugar Factory	Active	Bombana	
Gorontalo Sugar Factory	Active	Gorontalo	

=== Sumatra ===
Name of sugar factory	Status	District / City	Description
Cinta Manis Sugar Factory	Active	Ogan Ilir Regency	
PT. Gunung Madu Plantations	Active	Central Lampung Regency	
PT. Pemuka Sakti Manis Indah	Active	Way Kanan Regency	
PT. Sugar Group Companies	Active	Tulang Bawang Regency	
PT Sumber Muatiara Indah Perdana	Active	Dumai City	
Tjot Girek Sugar Factory	Inactive	North Aceh District	

== Netherlands ==
- Amsterdamsche Stoom Suikerraffinaderij
- Nederlandsche Suikerraffinaderij
- Wester Suikerraffinaderij

== New Zealand ==
- Chelsea Sugar Refinery, Birkenhead

== Northern Mariana Islands ==
- Nanyo Kohatsu Kabushiki Kaisha Sugar Mill, former industrial facility in the village of Songsong on the island of Rota in the Northern Mariana Islands

== Puerto Rico ==
- Central Coloso
- Central Cortada, Descalabrado, Santa Isabel
- Central Guánica, Ensenada, Guánica
- Central San Vicente, est. 1873 in Vega Baja
- Central Mercedita, at Hacienda Mercedita, Ponce, and home of Snow White sugar

== Serbia ==
- Sugar Refinery, Čukarica (1901), Belgrade

== United Kingdom ==
=== Tate & Lyle ===
- Sugar Juice refinery, London

=== British Sugar ===
- Cantley Sugar Factory, Cantley, Norfolk
- Sugar factory at Wissington, Norfolk, British Sugar's largest refinery and the largest sugar refinery in Europe
- Sugar factory in Bury St Edmunds, Suffolk
- Sugar factory in Newark, Nottinghamshire

== United States ==
- New Smyrna Sugar Mill Ruins (1830), also known as the Cruger and DePeyster Sugar Mill, now ruins, in New Smyrna Beach, Florida
- Dunlawton Plantation and Sugar Mill, north-central Florida, which was destroyed by the Seminoles in 1836 in the Second Seminole War and rebuilt.
- Yulee Sugar Mill Ruins Historic State Park (1851–64), Homosassa, Florida
- Imperial Sugar refinery in Port Wentworth, Georgia, where 14 people were killed and forty injured when a dust explosion occurred in 2008
- Haʻikū Sugar Mill, Maui, Hawaii, a processing factory for sugarcane from 1861 to 1879
- Waialua Sugar Mill (1865-1996), Oahu, Hawaii
- Old Sugar Mill of Kōloa (1835), Kauai, Hawaii, part of the first commercially successful sugarcane plantation
- McIntosh Sugarworks, near St. Marys, Georgia (1820s), now ruins
- Meeker Sugar Refinery, in Rapides Parish, Louisiana
- Rosalie Plantation Sugar Mill (c.1847), Rapides Parish, Louisiana
- Boston Sugar Refinery, East Boston, Massachusetts
- Domino Sugar Refinery, Williamsburg, Brooklyn, New York is a mixed-use development and former sugar refinery in the neighborhood of Williamsburg in Brooklyn, New York (1882-2004), replaced structures built 1856 and destroyed by a fire.
- Catherineberg Sugar Mill Ruins, Saint John, U.S. Virgin Islands
- Louisiana Sugar Refining, LLC, Gramercy, Louisiana

== See also ==
- Bien Hoa Sugar
- Puerto Rican immigration to Hawaii
- Raffinerie Tirlemontoise
- Sugar mills in Fiji
- Sugar plantations in Hawaii
- Sugar refinery
- Sugarcane mill
- Taiwan Sugar Corporation
- West Indies Sugar & Trading Company
