= Lists of buildings and structures in Puerto Rico =

This is a list of lists of notable buildings and structures in Puerto Rico. Lists include:

- List of airports in Puerto Rico
- List of bridges in Puerto Rico
  - List of bridges on the National Register of Historic Places in Puerto Rico
  - List of bridges documented by the Historic American Engineering Record in Puerto Rico
- List of Carnegie libraries in Puerto Rico
- List of casinos in Puerto Rico
- List of castles in Puerto Rico
- Churches
  - List of Catholic churches in Puerto Rico
  - List of Anglo-Catholic churches in Puerto Rico (Episcopal churches)
  - List of Methodist churches in Puerto Rico
- List of convention centers in Puerto Rico
- List of dams and reservoirs in Puerto Rico
- List of fire stations in Puerto Rico
- List of hospitals in Puerto Rico
- List of hotels in Puerto Rico
- List of high schools in Puerto Rico
- List of lighthouses in Puerto Rico
- List of Masonic buildings in Puerto Rico
- List of museums in Puerto Rico
- List of prisons in Puerto Rico
- List of sugar refineries in Puerto Rico
- List of theaters in Ponce, Puerto Rico
