= Nederlandsche Suikerraffinaderij =

Sugar refinery in Amsterdam, Netherlands

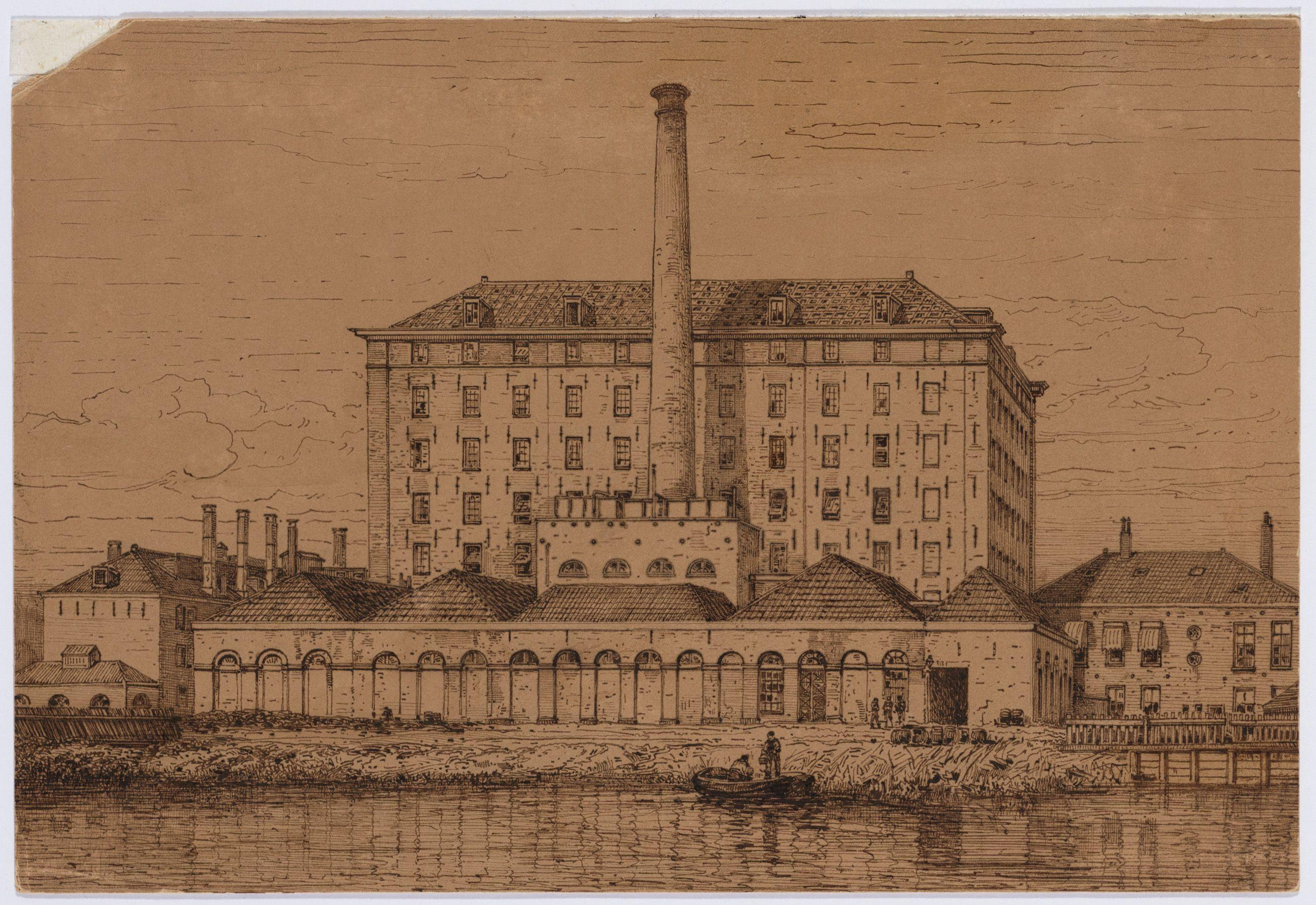
- Company refinery on bolwerk Osdorp from across the Singelgracht c. 1850-1860
- Industry: Sugar
- Founded: 1820
- Defunct: 1877
- Successor: Amstel Suikerraffinaderij
- Headquarters: Amsterdam, Netherlands

The Nederlandsche Suikerraffinaderij NV (NSR) (English: Dutch sugar refinery) was an Amsterdam sugar refining company that refined sugar cane to produce white sugar and other sugar products. After its closure, its main sugar refinery became part of the Amstel Suikerraffinaderij and later was part of the Wester Suikerraffinaderij.

== Context ==
During the first few hundred years after its creation in about 1600, the Amsterdam sugar industry consisted of many small sugar refineries. These sugar refineries processed the raw sugar from sugarcane to create white sugar. The French period (1794–1815) was extremely tough for the Dutch sugar industry, which at times completely cut off from its resources. By the late 1820s the Amsterdam sugar industry was in serious decay.

In 1827 the Amsterdam sugar industry consisted of about 60 companies that on average processed 200-250 tons of raw sugar. It began to grow again after the 1830 Belgian Revolution forced the Netherlands Trading Society (NTS) to redirect its supply of raw Java sugar from Antwerp to the northern Netherlands. That same year, the introduction of the Cultivation System in the Dutch East Indies also led to a sharp increase of sugar production on Java. The tax system encouraged the export of Java sugar to Dutch harbors.

Also in about 1830, the character of the Amsterdam sugar industry would be changed by two major inventions. Traditionally, raw sugar was boiled by making a fire below the pan. This was very inefficient, because the fire continued to consume fuel if it was no longer needed and a refinery required many fires. The invention of using tubes that led steam or hot oil through the pans required only one fire. It also gave much better control, diminishing the amount of sugar that burned on the pan's surface. The other invention was Howards vacuum pan, patented in 1813. This allowed to cook at a lower temperature and led to a better product. However, it also required a steam engine to drive an air pump, and a water reservoir. The cost of the machinery was such that a company had to process 1000-3000 tons of raw sugar to make a profit with use this new method.

== Preceding history ==
=== The Amsterdam refineries start to use steam power ===
The Amsterdam refineries were slow to follow the foreign inventions. In 1830 J.H. Rupe & Zoon bought a boiler in order to use steam for heating its pans. In 1833 or 1834 Rupe and Beuker & Hulshoff bought vacuum pans and steam engines in England. The fact that Rupe's single boiler replaced 13 fires gives an idea of the impact of these installations. Beuker & Hulshoff's installation consisted of a 40 hp boiler and a 6 hp steam engine. Showing that over 80% of the power was allotted for boiling and heating. The small steam engine was used for driving the pumps, and to keep a vacuum in two pans.

In 1834, the machine factory Van Vlissingen en Dudok van Heel got a license to produce vacuum pans according to the invention of Pelletan and De la Barre. This system created a vacuum by condensation and was therefore simpler and cheaper. A couple of Amsterdam refineries bought this system to modernize their production.

=== Firma C. de Bruyn en Zonen ===
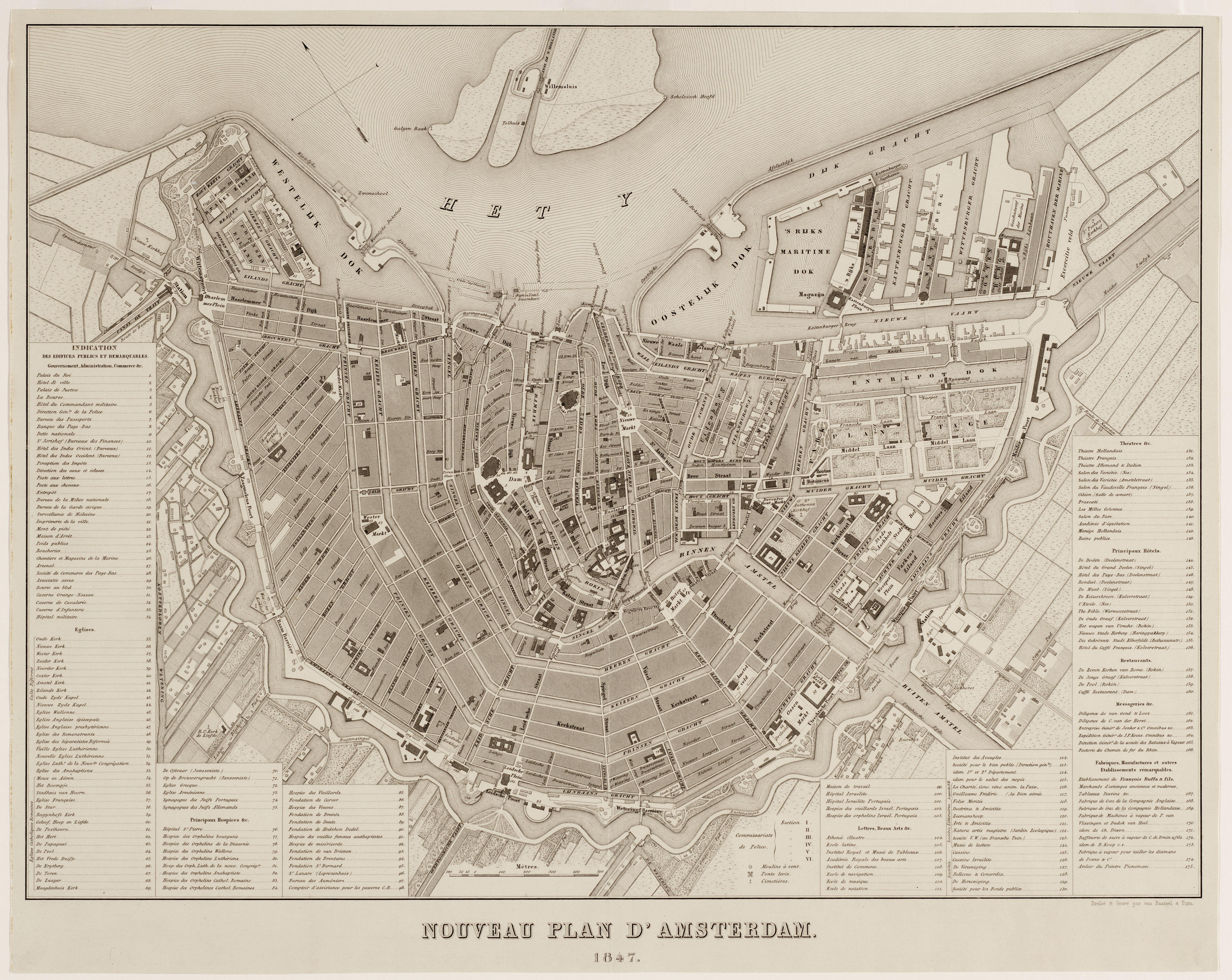
1847 map showing De Bruyn's two major refineries

From 1820 to 1833, C. de Bruyn (Cornelis de Bruyn Martinuszoon) owned a traditional sugar refinery on the Lijnbaansgracht. In 1831 he got permission to use steam for boiling sugar, and to use a 6 hp steam engine to drive pumps and the like. In 1834 De Bruyn bought the nearby refinery Stokholm and another refinery. On his death in 1834 he left his sons three refineries. By then the company was known as Firma C. de Bruyn en Zonen. This was a partnership that traded under the name (Firma or Fa.) C. de Bruyn en Zonen.

De Bruyn's three sons all choose to stay in the sugar refinery business. They expanded the company by buying the surrounding buildings. In the end it encompassed all buildings between the Lauriergracht, Passeerdersstraat, Lijnbaansgracht, and Passeerdersdwarsstraat. The number of boilers was four in 1835 and probably seven in 1841. In 1840 and 1841 C. de Bruyn en Zonen processed 25,000,000 kg of raw sugar a year. This amount of sugar was worth 6,500,000 guilders (ƒ). The De Bruyn brothers displayed their new found status by travelling in coaches drawn by 4 or 6 horses.

Already in 1836, the favorable trading conditions with the Dutch East Indies, and the investments in production facilities, allowed the big Amsterdam sugar refineries to export to the United Kingdom. This made the Netherlands Trading Society somewhat dependent on these companies. This was especially true with regard to De Bruyn, which took more than half of the NTS sugar at some 1841 auctions.

The mutual dependency between the NTS and the big Amsterdam sugar refineries led to dangerously high credits by the NTS to De Bruyn. These were probably instrumental in allowing De Bruyn to construct a big modern refinery on Bolwerk (Bastion) Osdorp in 1843, which became operational in 1846.

In parallel, De Bruyn founded a company to produce coal gas, the Hollandsche Gaz Fabriek. The use of gas to light the refinery allowed it to operate at night, and was much safer than using candles. The Imperial Continental Gas Association provided coal gas in Amsterdam. However, as a monopoly it refused to give a discount to big customers, so the Amsterdam sugar refineries supported De Bruyn's foundation of a competitor that started to operate in August 1847.

The very high debts and a few adversities brought De Bruyn acute liquidity problems in late 1847. On 6 December 1847 De Bruyn en Zonen therefore asked the Amsterdam court for an automatic stay so that the company could be reorganized. On 7 December, its creditors agreed to this stay. In a preliminary check of the accounts, the assets of the sugar refineries were ƒ2,957,979 and the liabilities ƒ2,284,792. For the gas factory this was ƒ893,654 and ƒ482,328.

== History of the company ==
=== Foundation ===
In early 1848, the receivers of De Bruyn en Zonen concluded that a liquidation of the company by selling its assets, would lead to very high losses for its creditors. The most probable reason would be that its specialized buildings and machinery and its sugar in stock, could not be sold for the price at which they were on the balance sheet. Furthermore, the NTS had secured its credit by a mortgage on De Bruyn's two big refineries, so the prospects for the other creditors were worse than the balance sheet alone suggested. It was their luck that NTS was also interested in the survival of its biggest customer.

In July 1848, the receivers of De Bruyn en Zonen proposed to the creditors to convert the sugar refineries and the gas factory into two public limited companies. This would allow the creditors of the refineries to get shares of the same nominal value as the money that they were owned, while still giving the new company a working capital of ƒ900,000. The creditors agreed to this proposal. However, in light of the vast interests that were involved, it would take some time before this company appeared.

On 15 October 1849, the Dutch government approved a first version of the provisional contract to found the naamloze vennootschap (NV) Nederlandsche Suikerraffinaderij (NSR). An updated contract was finally approved on 30 November 1849. On 7 December 1849 the contract to found the company was signed in Amsterdam.

The new company issued 2,800 shares of ƒ1,000 each. The list of shareholders was headed by the Netherlands Trading Society for 462 shares. The brothers Christiaan Hendrik de Bruijn, Martinnus de Bruijn Corneliszoon, and Adrian de Bruijn, who had been partners in Firma C. de Bruyn en Zonen mainly paid for their shares by bringing in: 1) The steam sugar refinery "De Vijf Gebroeders" on the Looiersgracht and Lijnbaansgracht, consisting of four capital buildings.; 2) The new steam sugar refinery on Osdorp Bastion. Both had been mortgaged to the Netherlands Trading Society for ƒ300,000. The De Bruyn brothers also brought in: 3) A traditional refinery on the Looiersgracht; 4) The warehouse called Cement Molen; 5) the house and warehouse called Oude Magazijn; 6) the warehouse Mercuur; 7) the warehouse Groote Wolbaal; 8) The buildings: De Twee Banen; Het Schild van Frankrijk and Het Huis te Egmond all on the Schans near Passeerderstraat.

The management of the company was formed by the three De Bruyn brothers as directors and Izak Bussemaker Hendrikszoon as president director. Every act of the compagny that required a signature would have to be signed by the president director and one of the other directors. The supervisory board had five members.

=== In business (1850–1858) ===
In 1850 and 1851, the Nederlandsche Suikerraffinaderij (NSR) was very busy. Profits were not good in 1851, because very strong supplies of colonial and beet sugar forced white sugar prices downward. In 1852 the company employed 400–800 people, while its competitors Spakler & Tetterode employed 80 regular staff, and Beuker & Hulshoff 160 regular staff. The numbers for the Amsterdamsche Stoom Raffinaderij were not given. In 1853 the Amsterdam refineries processed about 83,000 tons of raw sugar, of which 21,000 tons by the NSR. Of these 21,000 tons about 7,000 were exported to the United Kingdom. 1855 was a good year for the Amsterdam refineries. The NSR processed 19,000 tons of the 66,502 that Amsterdam processed in total. In 1856 the Dutch white sugar export dropped from 53.2 to 46.3 million kg. Of these 36 million had gone to the Mediterranean in 1855, but this trade came under pressure from French competition. A change in taxes on sugar also posed a problem. In 1856 NSR processed 16 million tons of the 65 million processed in Amsterdam.

In 1857 the general situation for the Dutch sugar industry became very serious. The white sugar export was only 42.75 million kg, with export shifting from the Mediterranean to the United Kingdom. In Amsterdam only 36.5 million kg of raw sugar was processed, of which 12 million by the NSR. Competitor Amsterdamsche Stoom Suikerraffinaderij had two of its refineries standing idle, and worked for only a few weeks. In November 1857, a proposal to liquidate the company was discussed in a shareholders meeting, but was rejected. The same meeting did approve the dismissal of the De Bruyn brothers as directors. Also in 1857 Fa. De Bruyn asked a government permit to found a sugar factory to produce raw sugar from sugar beets. This would become the Commanditaire Sociëteit voor Landbouw en Industrie onder firma De Bruyn, which founded the first successful beet sugar factory of the Netherlands in Zevenbergen.

This first period of business by NSR ended with the May 1858 shareholders meeting accepting the significant losses by deprecating the nominal value of shares from ƒ1,000 to ƒ350. This brought the share capital down to ƒ980,000. The original proposal had been to diminish this to ƒ700,000, and so the shareholders put it ƒ280,000 higher. A judge would later rule that the higher number caused the balance asset buildings and machinery to be fictitious for at least ƒ158,000.

=== In business (1858–1874) ===
1858 was also the year that the situation turned around. The Amsterdam refineries processed 62,176 tons of raw sugar against 36,425 tons in the previous year. Prices were higher and the NSR employed 320 people. In 1859 and 1860 the amount of raw sugar processed in Amsterdam rose to 64,298 and 76,729 tons. The company was not that successful, because it only processed 13,000 tons in 1860.

The relatively low production in 1860 may have been due to the company moving refinery activities from the Looiersgracht to the new refinery on Osdorp bastion in mid 1860. This new refinery had 7 boilers. On 30 July 1860 the steam refinery "De Vijf Gebroeders" was brought to auction in separate lots. In late 1861 some merchants then started the Hollandsche Suikerraffinaderij. They used these buildings for their refinery and office.

In 1861, the NSR processed 16,000 tons of raw sugar. In 1860 and 1861 NSR sold its old steam refinery De Vijf Gebroeders on Looiersgracht and (probably) also its less important traditional refinery on Looiersgracht, for a total sum of ƒ158,000. After this sale, the refinery on Osdorp bastion was modernized for ƒ262,000.

In 1862, NSR processed 17,000 tons of raw sugar and had 11 steam engines and 8 boilers with a total of 85 hp. In 1863 a new competitor appeared, the Hollandsche Suikerraffinaderij. In 1864 the Dutch production of white sugar rose from 65,250 tons to 88,000 tons, of which 71,500 tons were exported. In 1865 NSR produced as much as in 1864. Over 1866 a dividend of ƒ34 per ƒ350 share was paid. In 1867 production was high, but profits stayed behind. 1868 was also a very busy year in Amsterdam, but the NSR processed 1,000 tons less than in 1867. In 1869 the Amsterdam refineries were also busy, with competitor Hollandsche Suikerraffinaderij processing about 20,000 tons. In 1870 the Dutch sugar industry profited from the absence of the French competition. The NSR produced 'slightly more than the previous year'.

=== The end (1870–1877) ===
In the early 1870s, major changes in market conditions caused a crisis in the Dutch sugar refining industry. The opening of the Suez Canal had brought the important Mediterranean customers much closer to the East Indies. On Java, the forced sale of sugar to the Netherlands Trading Society was abolished in 1872. The protectionist export tariff Diferentieel regt which supported shipping to a Dutch harbor, was abolished on 1 January 1874. The British import tax on raw sugar was abolished on 1 April 1874. It all led to a major reroute of Java sugar from the Netherlands to harbors in the United Kingdom. While 59% of the Java sugar was shipped to the Netherlands in 1873, this was only 29% in 1874. In absolute terms the Dutch imports also decreased by 30%. In 1874, the competitor Amsterdamsche Stoom Suikerraffinaderij was liquidated after her main refinery had burnt down, and the shareholders did not see enough prospects to rebuild it.

The management of the NSR was not able to steer the Nederlandsche Suikerraffinaderij though the crisis. Instead of effectively handling the problems, or being open about them, it choose to conceal them. Some prices of the NSR shares of 350 guilders (ƒ) nominal are known for this period: November 1872: ƒ213; February 1874: ƒ181; In February 1875: ƒ88-90; in July 1875: ƒ47; In August 1876: ƒ16-18.

On 18 April 1877, the Amsterdam court granted an automatic stay to the NSR. A commission of inquiry was formed to investigate: the 1876 balance sheet, business since 1 January 1877, and the probable causes of the losses. On 23 May 1877 the report of the inquiry was presented in a shareholders meeting, which then refused to approve the balance sheet over 1876 and decided to declare bankruptcy.

The report noted many irregularities and bad practices. E.g. assets had not been specified in detail, and had not been deprecated properly. The inquiry turned ugly when it investigated the asset inventory (Raffinaderij). The chief operator alone reported about this asset. It supposedly led the directors to report a probable profit of ƒ76,000 on 12 March 1877, only to report a huge loss on 11 April when inventory was found to be surprisingly low. The commission asked the chief operator if he could uphold his reports in good faith. He answered that: the balance had been inflated somewhat, just like the previous balances. When he repeated this in the presence of the directors, there was no protest, nor notable surprise. The commission therefore made its own computations of the inventory on 1 January 1877. It noted that the balance over 1876 inflated the amount of white sugar in stock and its value by ƒ169,800. It also noted that over 111,770 kg of raw sugar had not been accounted for.

The inquiry of the commission summarized its work on the balance of 1876 by stating that assets were ƒ302,550 less than reported, leading to a total loss of ƒ758,000 on 31 December 1876. The commission then went a bit further and also looked at the (already approved) balance sheet of 1875. It noted that this should have specified a total loss of ƒ445,963 on 31 December 1875 instead of just ƒ93,000. In other words: the report of the directors that ƒ450,000 had been lost in the first months of 1877 was not correct, it had been lost over the previous years.

== Liability of the management ==
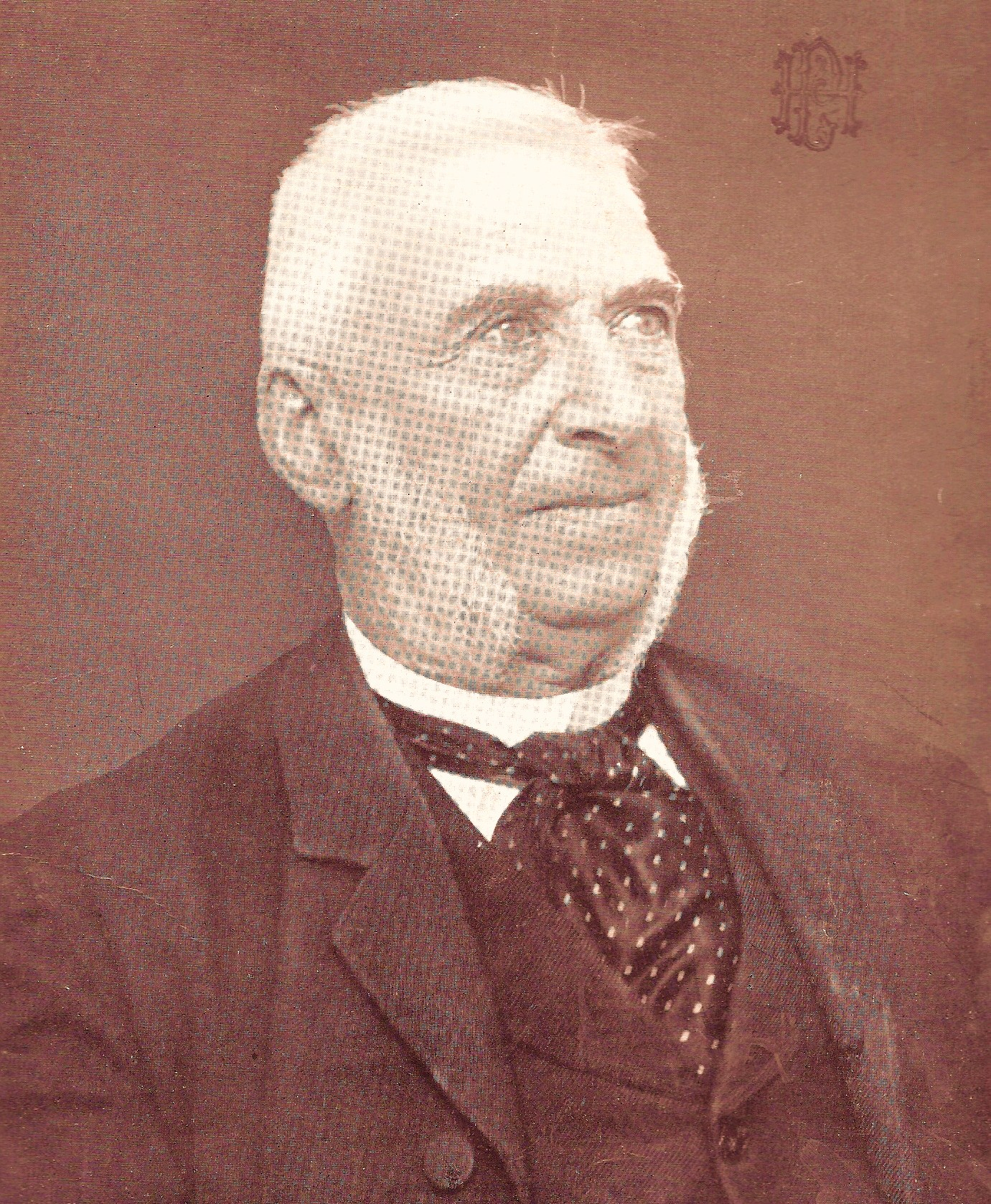
I.A. Levy in 1910

It was obvious that the Nederlandsche Suikerraffinaderij had not been properly managed. It was not certain whether this would lead to personal liability of the directors. At the time, article 47 of the Wetboek van Koophandel stated that as soon as 75% of the share capital (i.e. of ƒ980,000) of a limited company was lost, it was legally disbanded. From the moment that the board knew about such a loss, or should have known about this, they were liable in person for any further acts of the company.

On 22 March 1877, the Nederlandsche Suikerraffinaderij bought an amount of raw sugar which it could not pay later. Vendor Gottfried Meijer & Co. brought a lawsuit against the directors of the company, H.C. Cruijs and H.J.F. Munzebrock. The vendor noted that the balance sheet of 1876 admitted a loss of ƒ453,000. Furthermore, the December 1877 auction of buildings and inventory for ƒ263,200 proved that their valuation at ƒ790,000 was at least ƒ300,000 too high. Therefore, the board should have known that on 22 March 1877 the total loss was at least (453,000 + 300,000) ƒ753,000 and thus should have known that over 75% of the company's capital had been lost. The court of Amsterdam convicted the board members to pay ƒ27,053 to Gottfried Meijer & Co. It reasoned that the two directors had known since 1858 that the valuation of the buildings was too high, and should have been deprecated since. It furthermore noted that the price that a sugar refiner intended on proceeding with the business paid at an auction was a good valuation.

Famous lawyer Isaac Abraham Levy (1836-1920), did not like this verdict and wrote about it. He stated that determining the book value of a factory by a later auction would mean that specialized factories would have to be deprecated almost completely before they even started to operate. As an alternative, Levy suggested to look at the German commercial law, which made explicit that buildings had to be regularly deprecated for wear and tear, but not more. The German court also noted that on the balance, buildings had to be valued for their use in a continuing business, and possible liquidation should not play a role.

== Amstel Suikerraffinaderij ==
On 20 December 1877, the firma Deichmann & Vom Rath bought the buildings and machinery of the NSR for ƒ245,000 and announced they would found a limited company for refining sugar. On 7 September 1878 they founded the Amstel Suikerraffinaderij. It was to have a share capital of ƒ600,000.
