= Ageston sugar plantation =

Historical sugar plantation in Queensland, Australia

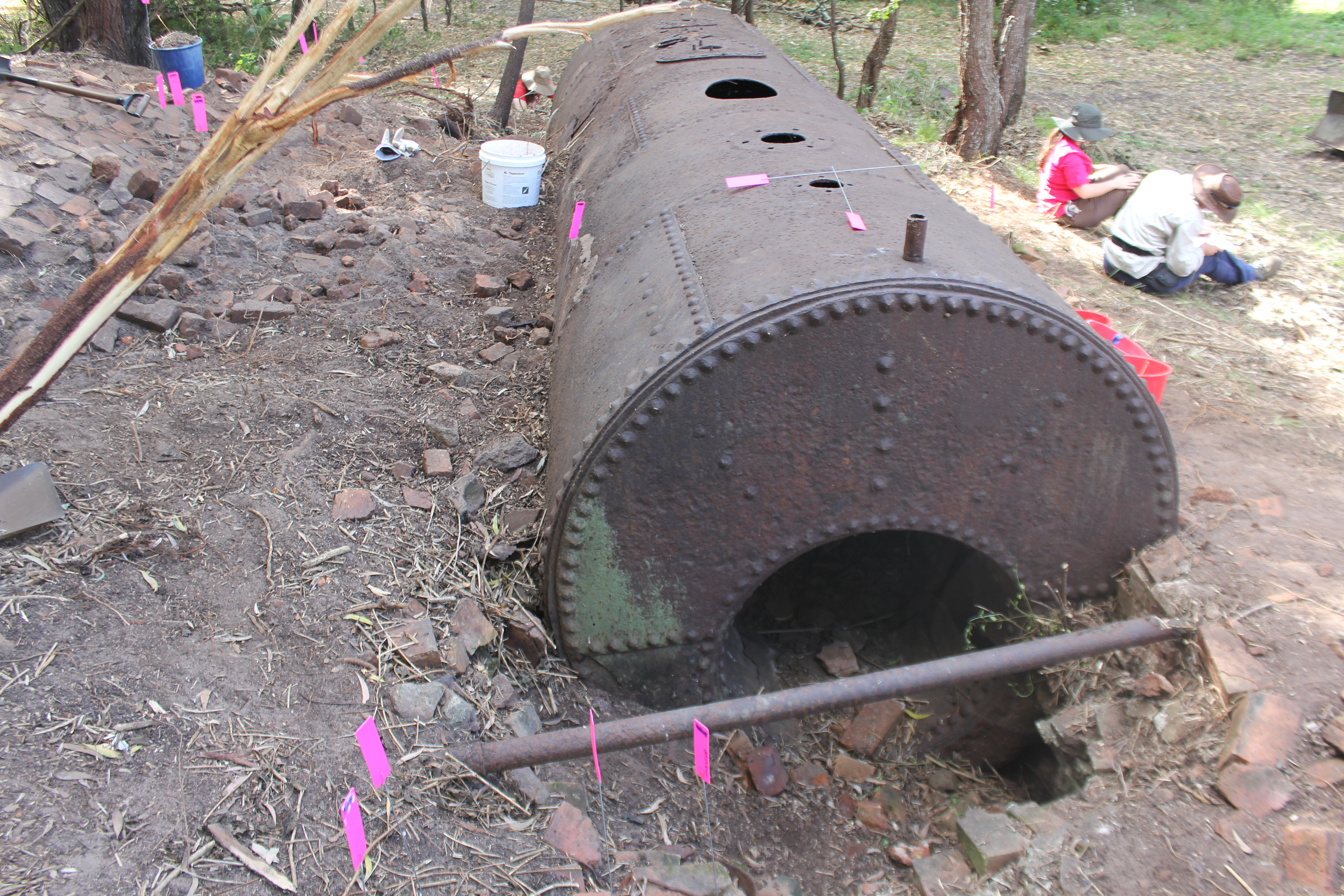
Cornish boiler at the mill site, former Ageston Sugar Plantation, Gold Coast, Queensland, Australia in 2013

Ageston Sugar Plantation was a sugar plantation established in 1866 on the Logan River at Alberton, Gold Coast, Queensland, Australia. It was one of a number of early plantations which pioneered the region's sugar industry.

== History ==
=== John Stevens ===
Ageston plantation was established on the south bank of the Logan River by John Stevens in 1866. John Stevens was born in Maine, USA, and came to Australia in 1835, involving himself in squatting and then cotton and sugar cultivation. Ageston was selected under the Regulations for the Cultivation of Sugar and Coffee of 1864 and 1866, and later brought under the Crown Lands Act of 1868. The original Ageston holding comprised a 320-acre block (Portion 2) of native forest and swamp. Fifty acres of cotton was grown, but following a poor yield Stevens turned to sugarcane, planting out 60 acres. A comfortable house set within gardens and orchards was built upon a hill that was the highest point on the estate. Like most of the sugar estates of the district, Ageston depended heavily on indentured South Sea Island labour. In November 1868 the plantation relied wholly on the labour of eight South Sea Islanders who managed two bullock teams and four horses, and this workforce was expected to increase when the cane had to be harvested. There was a horse-drawn mill to crush the cane and a wharf enabled steamers to regularly collect the sugar for market and bring in supplies.

Despite the soil largely being white, impoverished sand eroding from a sandstone substrate, the plantation proved highly productive, mostly because of the excellent drainage and presence of aquifers and springs. The plantation was also among the most favourably situated in the district, having a north easterly aspect, and being close enough to the mouth of the river to receive a mild coastal climate that mitigated against frost and extremes of heat but still being adequately sheltered.

In 1868 a correspondent for The Brisbane Courier visited the site and described the various improvements made:

A good split-rail fence had been erected round the cultivation. There are also six pig paddocks, of about two acres each, close paled (occupied by nearly sixty pigs), and the garden has been considerably enlarged. A new cotton shed had been built, which is to be turned into a tobacco shed eventually-a small patch of which is being tried, and a large kitchen next the house has also been finished. A stable for six horses is in course of erection. I noticed that the garden is kept in first rate order, and it is not too much to say that it is not only the largest, but the most orderly and comprehensive I have seen in tho district. I saw coffee, chicory, and earth nuts, near the common European garden produce of beans, peas, onions, and carrots, all looking well, whilst the large hedges of passion fruit were loaded, and the grapes, of several varieties, without any symptom of disease. There are also some young cocoa-nuts, yams, and other South Sea Island produce. Near a spring I saw the celebrated taro, of which the Islanders are so fond, and which is a water lily looking plant. The cassava does well, and there is a large patch near another patch of arrowroot, both of which Mr Stevens makes into meal for home use. Then there is the pawpaw from the Islands, which is thriving well, as well as lots of other choice and rare fruits and trees. I was told Mrs Stevens was the gardener, and l am sure she must take great pains, and every credit must be awarded her for her varied selection of flowers. On the left of the garden is a huge rabbit pen, where rabbits are bred and reared for the table at an almost incredible rate, the climate and food of young sorghum, maize, sow-thistle etc., being so favourable. Next (sic) these the fowls are lodged and kept as another indispensable for a farmer's wife. In walking round here I was shown a long hedge of Cape thorn, which seems to be well adapted for plantation fences, as what I saw was quite cattle-proof, and with attention this thorn could soon be trained to suit almost all fencing purposes. Mr. Stevens had just made a cockatoo fence at first, and then planted the Cape thorn seeds. It fruits almost like an orange, but it is worthless for eating.

Other observations at this time were:

John Stevens died in February 1871 and the estate went to auction. Prior to his death, and possibly in response to failing health, title to the lease was transferred to Joseph Baynes of Brisbane in May 1870. The advertisement for the sale notes that at this time the property comprised 641 acres, a lease having been taken out in 1869 on an adjoining 320-acre block to the east. Seventy acres were under cane and there were 200 acres of fenced paddocks, a horse mill with improvements by Smellie & Co., a stable (45 feet by 15 feet), a sugar store (50 feet by 15 feet), two huts for workers, and a weatherboard house of seven rooms with 2 acres of garden planted with coffee, orange, lemon, peach and other trees and flowers. There was also the spring, which supplied both the mill and the house. It was further noted that steamers and other craft from Brisbane passed on a daily basis and that the labour on the estate was carried out solely by experienced South Sea Islanders. Additional information on the plantation is provided by the Census of 1871, which identifies that there were 10 inhabited buildings and 30 people (27 men and 3 women).

=== William Couldery ===
The plantation was sold to William Henry Couldery of Gympie in 1871. London born, William Henry immigrated to Australia as a young man due to a respiratory illness, and on regaining his health undertook pastoral pursuits in New South Wales and Queensland before arriving in Gympie in 1868. On the recently proclaimed goldfield he became renowned as an innovator, introducing new technology such as electric lighting and modern mining machinery. He owned or had shares in a number of goldmines and profited from the Gympie gold rush, becoming the first chairman of the Gympie Divisional Board and taking positions on many other local institutions. In 1872 he married Susanna Geddes of Caboulture and by the following year had started a family, with the birth of a daughter, Beatrice, at his Gympie residence, Warlingham Villa. The Couldreys had three more children, Reginald Hall (b. 1875), Victor Carlton (b. 1881) and Dorothy Rosamund (b. approx. 1896). William Couldery did not initially take up residence at Ageston, remaining instead in Gympie to oversee his interests there. Like many plantations, Ageston was run by a manager, the first being William Mune. To abide by the terms of the lease, William Mune lived on site as Couldery’s bailiffe. In 1879 a man named John Quinn also acted with Mune as bailiffe for the estate.

The original survey plans for the estate note that a deed was never issued for Stevens’ second block, and this may have been the catalyst for a resurvey and new lease application in 1871 which created a larger block of 492 acres (Portion 249). The bulk of this land was low-lying swamp and salt marsh partially inundated by the spring tides. The total size of the plantation was now 792 acres. In June 1871 two bullock teams were required to draw fencing for about 140 chains, and in April 1872 tenders were being called for grubbing, clearing and ploughing 30 acres of land. In 1873 the amount of land under cane extended to about ninety acres. The Bourbon cane was the variety principally grown as it suited the forest soil best, but other varieties, such as ribbon cane, were also present. Operations were also modernised, with the now outdated horse mill being replaced by one of the finest steam driven mills in the Moreton district. A wooden railway conveyed the cane to the mill, which incorporated the district’s the first vacuum pan. This innovation was significant as it represented a major step in improving the region’s sugar industry, which at the time was using a variety of primitive techniques and patented processes which often resulted in sugar of poor or inconsistent quality. The vacuum pan heated sugarcane juice in a partial vacuum, reducing its boiling point and so allowing much greater fuel efficiency than the open kettle system then in use. It was also safer for the operators. The vacuum pan was eventually adopted in sugar refining, escalating production and reducing the price of product.

The original Ageston selection (Portion 2) was converted to freehold in 1876 following the required 10 years of rent payments and property improvements. This year was also marked by Couldery winning first prize at the Exhibition of the Southern Queensland Agricultural Society for sugar produced by vacuum pan from ribbon and Bourbon cane, and over successive years continued to win prizes for his sugar. Ageston sugar was also shown at the New South Wales Intercolonial Exhibition of 1877. Often Ageston represented the only entry in the vacuum pan class. For a number of years Ageston remained the only plantation in the region to use the vacuum pan, all other manufacturers using open pans. The mill at Beenleigh did not get a vacuum pan until 1878.

A detailed description of the Ageston mill was given in 1873. It was noted that the site of the mill was on a gentle rise from the river, with the roads and tramway from the field converging on the upper side of the building. The shed covering the principal portion of the machinery was estimated at 120 feet long by 36 feet wide, with side wings for the engine, mill, and clarifiers on the one hand, and the necessary stores and offices on the other. Once delivered to the mill, the cane was crushed by rollers that were 86 inches long by 80 inches diameter. The waste, bagasse (also called megass), was used in a number of ways: fuel for the boilers, consumed by the plantation’s horses, or carried off by a truck on the wooden railway to a portion of low ground here it was partially composted before being returned to the fields as fertiliser. The juice from the cane was gravity fed into steam-jacketed clarifiers supplied by waste steam from the engine; then after being tempered and clarified, it was allowed to run into the battery which consisted of three large east iron pans and ‘double teach’ of copper. The concentrated liquor was raised in a copper dipper by windlass, and run into cisterns, from which it was passed into the well of the vacuum pan. This pan was a closed vessel, from which the air was extracted by means of a steam engine and air pump; it was 6 feet in diameter and made of cast iron lined with copper. It boiled the liquid at 140 degrees Fahrenheit. The stage and pan were supported by cast iron pillars, and for the security of the attendant the stage was surmounted by an iron railing. The air pump was driven by 12 horsepower engine. At the finish the contents were discharged by a valve into a receiver below and then into the centrifugals. The centrifugals were by Manlove and Alliott, of Birmingham, and were driven by the vacuum-pan engine by way of a gearing system. Once the manufacturing process was complete, the sugar was transferred to the store alongside the mill, where it was bagged and made ready for shipment. The engines, pan, and clarifiers were supplied with steam by two large boilers fitted with Galloway tubes (one to each plate) and the necessary draught obtained by a chimney seventy feet in height. There were also tramways for the supply of firewood to the furnaces, and for moving cane to the mill or sugar to the wharf. All of the machinery, except the centrifugals, were manufactured by J. Walker and Co., of the Union Foundry, Maryborough. The general management of the plant was by Mr Strachan, an engineer with experience working and erecting sugar machinery. The expertise and new technology injected into the mill greatly increase efficiency and quality of the product, with the sugar valued at £40 per ton.

In 1874 William Mune oversaw another expansion phase, calling for tenders to clear and grub 100 acres in lots of 5 to 20 acres. Under William Mune, trials and experiments in sugar processing were undertaken, with the Gill process (which used electricity in the clarification) being selected by late 1877. In 1876 the mill complex was described as extensive and close to the river, and it included a large distillery. Ageston also had its own bond store, cooperage and government customs officer, who was accommodated on site.

Although William Couldery resided in Gympie and was registered as a freeholder there on the Queensland electoral roll until 1891, he was also registered as a leaseholder, and then freeholder, at Ageston in the roll for the Logan Electoral District through to 1904/5. He appeared to have a close involvement in the management of the estate and did periodically visit it. It was during such a visit, in 1875, that the office at the manager’s house was struck by lightning not longer after the occupants had finished dinner. The lightning ignited a batch of newspapers in the office, and the flames spread to a bed and the calico lining of the room. William Couldery saved the building by throwing the burning materials outside into the rain. The account of the incident provides an insight into the spatial arrangement and domestic life of the house, referring to the presence of women and children, including a servant girl and a baby belonging to Mune. In addition to an office, the house had a dining room and a sitting room. William Couldery had his own bedroom within the residence, while the customs official slept in the office, the bed that was burned being his.

Turning sugarcane juice or molasses, a by-product of the sugar making process, into rum was an important economic sideline of many of the local mills. Not all the distilleries were licensed and already noted there was considerable illegal trade in black market alcohol. Ageston was one of the legitimate producers, obtaining its first distillers licence in 1877, and in the early 1880s the distillery was in fact the only legal one in the district. Ageston rum was of high quality, winning prizes and praise at agricultural exhibitions. The distillery also produced a fine quality Hollands gin. In August 1878 the still collapsed, causing £16 worth of damage, and William Mune prosecuted the distiller, Julius Woolf, in the Beenleigh court, believing that the man had been negligent with the apparatus. The growing importance of the plantation and its distillery warranted the appointment of John McMahon as an inspector of distilleries in January 1880. John McMahon resided at Ageston. He was replaced by James Brown in 1883, who had previously been stationed on Yengarrie plantation in Maryborough. James remained at Ageston until his retirement in 1890.

In 1880, while boring for water, a seam of coal was discovered at a depth of 250 feet. Although this find elicited some excited commentary from the press, nothing came of it, and there was no serious exploitation of the resource. Of greater importance was finding a source of good clay on the estate - this led to the establishment by 1883 of a brickworks using an English brick making machine which produced three types of bricks (common, fancy and firebricks), as well tiles and drain-pipes. These were of sufficient quality to win prizes at exhibitions, and be sold on the Brisbane market and as far as Gympie Ageston bricks were valued as furnace linings because of their ability to withstand 6000 degrees Fahrenheit.

A crucial improvement to the plantation was the introduction of a drainage scheme. By 1879 2000 chains of open drainage and floodgates had been installed. Portion 249 also had approximately 100 acres of land that been cleared, stumped and planted with cane, 100 chains of two rail fence and 50 chains of tramway. By 1881 the drainage system had transformed much of the swampland into productive canefields. As well as open drains, the system also comprised a levee bank along the Logan River and closed drains of terracotta pipes manufactured on the plantation.

In 1881 William Mune resigned and W.M.C Hickson took over as manager. He was at Ageston until 1884/5 when he moved to Bundaberg to take charge of Rubyana plantation, which had been purchased by a syndicate in which he was a member. There were discussions to replace him with his brother, John Hickson, and this may have come to pass as a Mr Hickson is mentioned in connection with the management of Ageston late in 1885, and in that year a son was born to AJ Hickson and his wife at Ageston. If the brother did work at Ageston it was only for a period of months, as no Hickson is recorded at Ageston in the Queensland electoral role for Logan after 1885.

At its height in the early 1880s, the estate employed up to 40 South Sea Islanders. Only a little is known of how Ageston’s Melanesian workforce was treated or where they resided. Given the estate’s close involvement with colonial authorities via its resident inspector, it is doubtful that mistreatment was countenanced. However it had the typical paternalistic power structure of a plantation, and the few reports available suggest that the Islanders working the estate experienced many of the same conditions and stresses that their fellows on other estates in the district faced. They were employed to clear land, dig drains and other earthworks, build fences, cultivate and haul cane and work bullocks and horses. They were also engaged at the mill, although legislation introduced in the 1880s excluded them from skilled or technical work; however, there were still various menial occupations available at the plant. Historical references indicate that they lived in small huts rather than communal barracks, kept small livestock, used a form of pigeon English to communicate with the manager, and probably grew various familiar vegetable foods such as taro. At times there were disputes between different Islanders on the estate, as well as friction with the estate management.

In 1872, for example, five South Sea Islanders, named Samango, Wakoolich, Gope, Haline, and Susum, were brought up on a charge of deserting from the hired service of William Couldery, and ordered to be sent to the Beenleigh Bench. A couple of years later, in 1874, tensions between Islanders erupted when a man named Kapp (Gapp) was tried, and acquitted, for the manslaughter of another South Sea Islander named Watumah, who was employed to haul cane from the wharf to the mill.

Although Ageston was one of the more advanced and profitable plantations in the district, it was not immune to the growing problems within the industry and in 1884, faced with the low price of sugar and the difficulty in sourcing labour, William Couldery made the decision to gradually phase out sugar production and move into general farming and horse breeding. This year was also marked by personal tragedy with the death of daughter Beatrice. On reviewing operations on the estate, William purchased a number of heavy New Zealand mares as well as 23 draft mares from the Hunter River. This brought the herd to 40, but this was expected to grow with most of the mares being in foal to an imported horse, Paisley Jock, and a further consignment of pedigree stock coming from Sydney. William intended to grow oats and lucerne, relying on mowing machines, horse rakes and a smaller number of labourers to cultivate his land. The nucleus of a herd of pure-bred Ayrshire cattle, a dairy breed, was also established which became renowned in the district, with bulls calved on the estate being sold as far was Tiaro and Maryborough, and champion cows being exhibited at the Melbourne National Show.

As part of the strategy to diversify the income of the estate, William and his manager, Hickson, had attached a sawmill to the mill by 1885. This used the boiler and engines of the mill during the non-crushing season and provided employment for a large number of men. It was hoped that this, coupled with the brick and tile works, distillery and drainage scheme would ensure the economic future of the estate. However, the crushing season of 1885/6 was to be the last time Ageston grew or crushed cane on any significant scale.

In 1887 a catastrophic flood impacted the district, resulting in widespread loss of stock and infrastructure. No substantial damage was reported at Ageston and William Couldery, who had a supply of 40 000 feet of hardwood from the sawmill, offered to meet relief orders for scantling at a reduced cost.

The downturn in the sugar industry at this time induced the government to hold an enquiry in 1888. William Couldery gave evidence, stating that he was no longer making a profit from sugar and arguing for the retention of South Sea Islander labour to support the industry. By this date the estate was reported as being 1300 acres, with £30,000 having been invested in it. However, only five acres were under production (3 acres of sweet potato and 2 acres of lucerne). The main activities on the estate were distilling and cattle breeding, which employed 6 Europeans. There was no reference to the presence of South Sea Islanders.

During the drought of 1888 William Couldery decided to cease horse breeding and instructed Brisbane auctioneers to sell his entire stud of 54 draught horses. With Hickson gone, William based himself more permanently on the property. In late 1891 he and his wife moved from Ageston to a property, Cedar Grove, on the Upper Logan. Cedar Grove was inherited from his wife’s family, and here he built a cheese factory and concentrated on dairying. William Couldery retained Ageston, however, where the bulk of his Ayrshire herd was kept – in 1892 the herd numbered over 200 head, the largest Ayrshire herd in Queensland. In 1893, when William Couldery did not apply to have his distilling license renewed, the distillery was dismantled and the still secured by government authorities.

In 1894 the estate was transferred into Susannah Couldery’s name. At this time Ageston had a large olive grove and the following year put the mill rollers to use in an olive crushing trial. By the turn of the century, William and Susannah had moved to Sydney. Ageston was occupied and managed by their son, Victor, while Cedar Grove was in the hands of Reginald Despite the advertised sale in 1899 of 330 acres of land at bargain prices, Ageston endured into the early 20th century. Cattle remained an economic pursuit, Victor Couldery building a cattle dip in 1906, and his brother, Reginald, reported as moving stock from that property to Ageston in 1907. However, the family interest in Ageston was fading. William and Susannah Couldery moved to Sydney, where Susannah died in 1912, and William in 1919. Not long after William's death the plantation was subdivided and sold off.

== Archaeology ==
Today the site of the plantation remains an agricultural landscape that continues to grow sugar cane as well as support cattle and horses. Archaeological investigation and earlier field surveys have identified a number of artefacts and physical features relating to the functioning of the plantation. The site of the manager’s residence is located on a hill on Lot 2RP6185. Although the original house has disappeared and been replaced by a house dating from the 1930s, the site is identifiable by a set of masonry or brick stairs (reclad in contemporary sandstone and incorporated into the existing house) and a square, buried, subterranean feature of rendered brickwork said to be a cellar. Immediately north of the existing house are a large mango tree (Mangifera indica) and Cook Island pine tree (Araucaria columnaris), both of advanced age. These specimens are probably survivors of the original house garden. The pine tree in particular likely dates from the plantation period, as indicated by the conical tree in approximately the same position on the hill shown in the 1882 image below. To the east of the hill on which the residence site is located in a section of low flat land fronting the river and fringed by mangroves. This was a former sugarcane field but now supports a mixture of pasture and salt grass and is grazed by cattle. The field is dissected by a series of open drains that drain to the east through a levee bank. Visible on the eastern side of the levee bank is a large brick culvert. Information provided by the property owner indicates that there are also buried drains of terracotta pipes which extend out into the mangrove areas. A cutting believed to be the remains of the tramway originates from this field system and runs northwest, climbing the side of the manager’s residence hill. It crosses onto Lot 2SP197213 where it divides, one branch descending to the river flat lying in front of the mill site; the other branch terminating at the mill site itself. The mill is located on a north-facing slope on Lot 2SP197213, where it overlooks the Logan River. It is covered by dense tree cover and, prior to the archaeological investigation, lantana and other weedy growth. The removal of weeds and some targeted removal of the modern topsoil has revealed various brick floors and walkways, stone machinery foundations, an in-situ cast iron Cornish boiler, an overturned cast iron rectangular pan, the base of a kiln, a concrete pad tentatively interpreted as a brick-making area, a circular feature of unknown purpose, postholes, and a raised pathway leading to the site of the wharf. To the west of the mill site is a large stand of bamboo and a series of ponds. It is unknown if the bamboo or ponds are contemporaneous with the mill.
