= List of convention centers in Puerto Rico =

This is a list of convention centers in Puerto Rico.

== Convention centers ==
- Centro de Convenciones de Ponce
- Guayama Convention Center
- Puerto Rico Convention Center
