= List of castles in Puerto Rico =

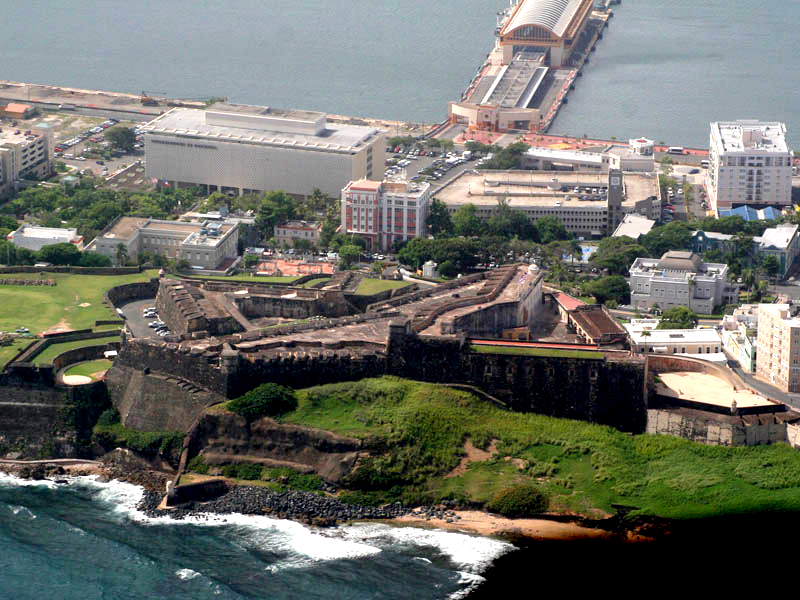
Castillo San Cristobal, in San Juan

This is a list of castles in Puerto Rico. Some cannot properly be described as true castles. They are primarily country houses, follies, or other types of buildings built to give the appearance of a castle. They are usually designed in the Spanish Colonial Revival, Spanish Colonial architecture, or Neoclassical styles. Most, however, were designed as fortifications, in particular for military defense purposes.

== List of castles in Puerto Rico ==
- Castillo San Cristóbal, in San Juan, built in 1783 by the Spanish to protect against land-based attacks on the city of San Juan, it is now part of San Juan National Historic Site.
- Castillo Serrallés, in Ponce, built in 1933 for Juan Eugenio Serrallés, son of businessman Juan Serrallés, founder of Destilería Serrallés, the structure sits on a 2.5-acre (1.0 ha) exceedingly manicured property.

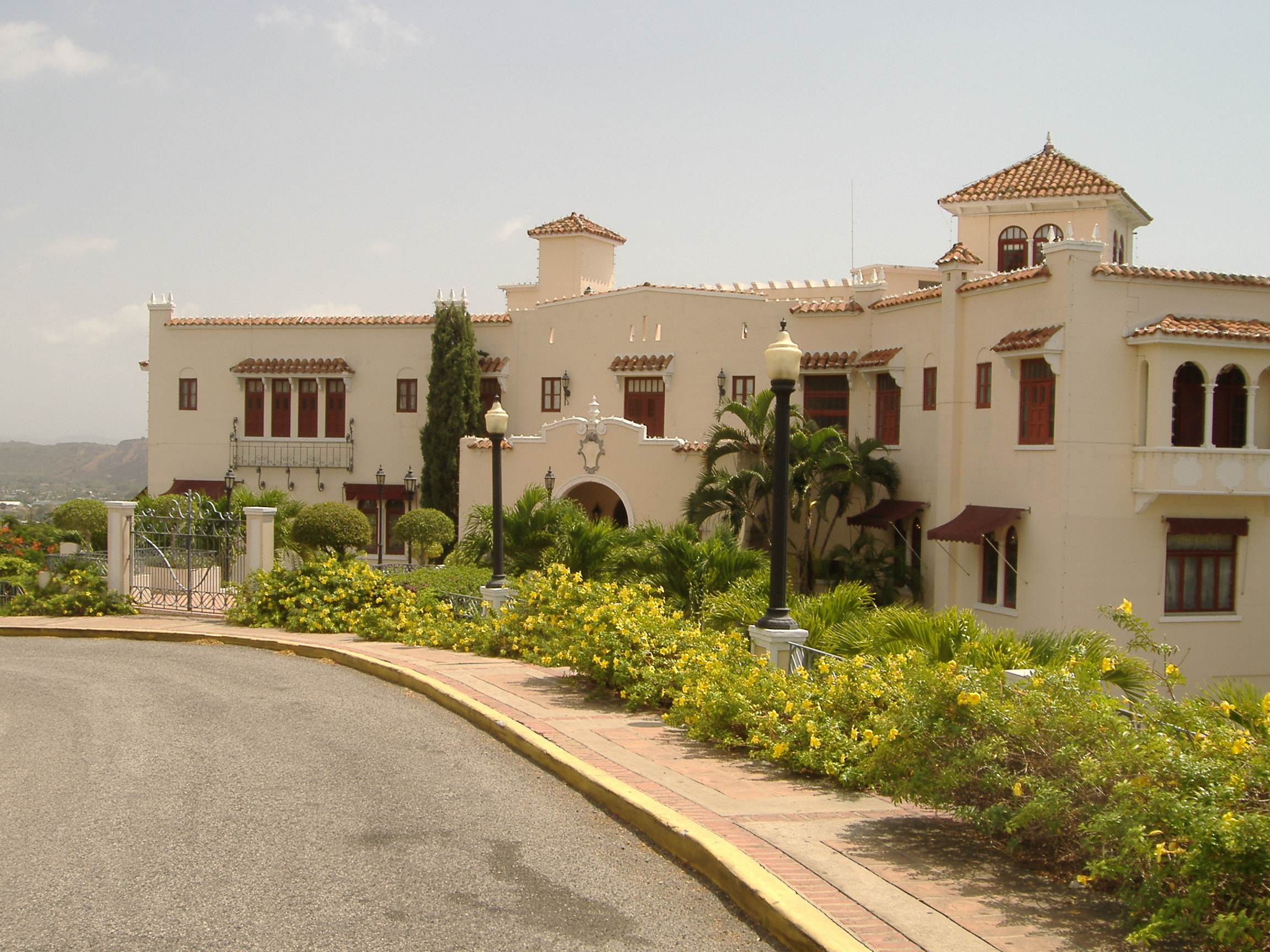
Castillo Serrallés, in Ponce

- Castillo San Felipe del Morro, in San Juan, also known as El Morro, is a citadel built between 16th and 18th centuries to defend the city from seaborne military attacks.

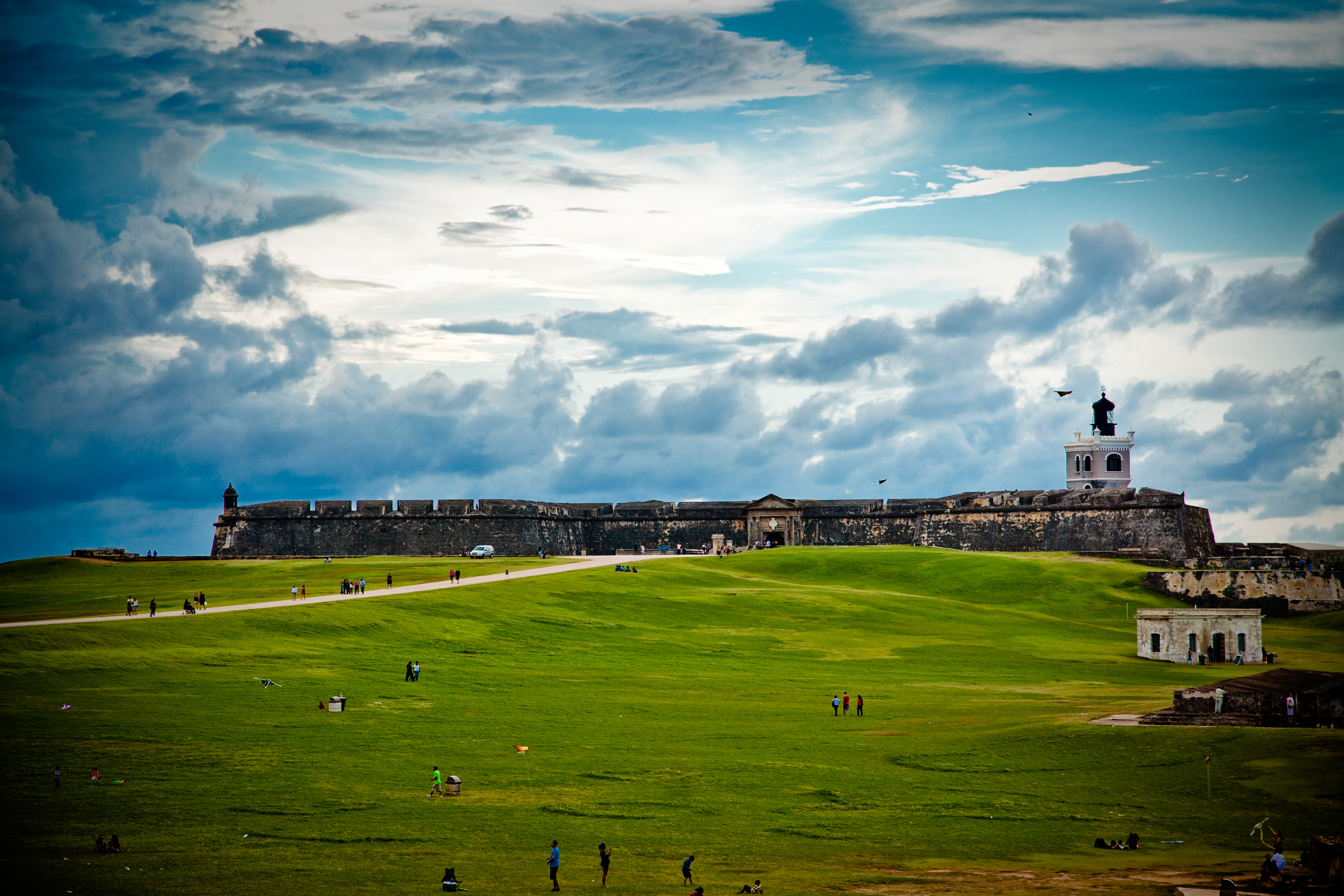
Castillo San Felipe del Morro in San Juan, In San Juan

- Cuartel Militar Español de Ponce, known as El Castillo (The Castle), in Ponce, is the only structure directly related to the events of the land defense of Puerto Rico during the 1898 American invasion of the Island. It was built by the Spanish Royal Corps of Engineers as general headquarters for the Spanish military garrison stationed in Ponce, and dates from 1894. (Note: Eduardo Neumann Gandia (Verdadera y Autentica Historia de la Ciudad de Ponce, 1913, Reprinted 1987, pp. 104-105) states it was built in 1849. Whichever of the two dates is the correct date, it appears that one or the other of these two sources (Eduardo Neumann Gandia's and Mariano G. Corona Castro's) is incorrect by the transposition of the last two digits of the stated years (1849 v. 1894)) The structure was listed on the U.S. National Register of Historic Places on 14 May 1987.

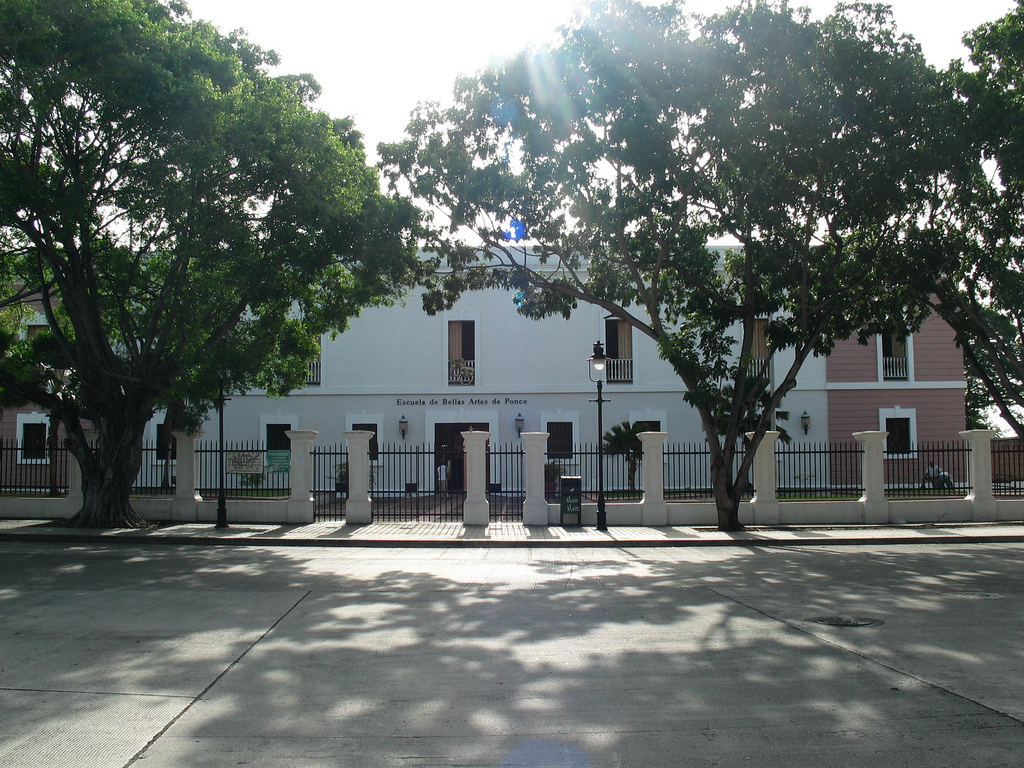
Cuartel Militar Español ("El Castillo), in Ponce

== See also ==
- List of castles
- List of tourist attractions worldwide
