= Rådhusstræde 3 =

Building in Copenhagen, Denmark

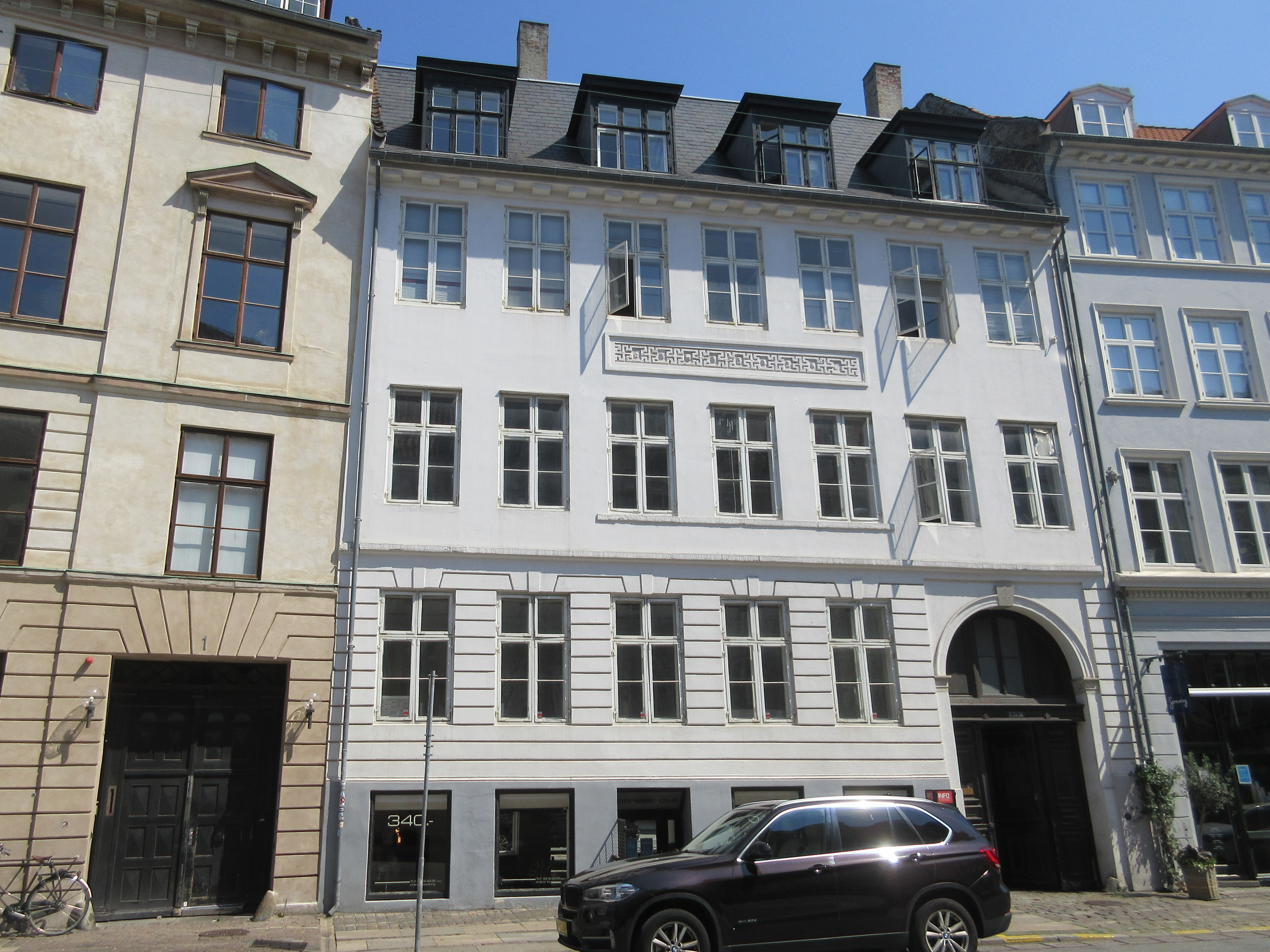
- Interactive map of the Rådhusstræde 3 area

General information
- Location: Copenhagen, Denmark
- Coordinates: 55°40′37.42″N 12°34′27.16″E
- Completed: 1796–1797

Rådhusstræde 3 is a Neoclassical property located in the Old Town of Copenhagen, Denmark. It was listed in the Danish registry of protected buildings and places in 1939.

== History ==
=== 18th century ===
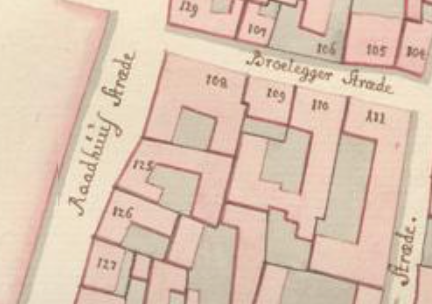
No. 125 seen on a detail from Christian Gedde's map of Snaren's Quarter, 1757.

The property was listed in Copenhagen's first cadastre of 1689 as No. 142 on Sbaren's Quarter, owned by Anders Larsen. The property was listed in the new cadastre of 1756 as No. 125 and belonged to Andreas Adam Kolmes at that time.

The property was later acquired by brewer Ole Nielsen Lind. He lived there with his daughter Olive Benedicte Lovise Lind, four employees and a maid at the 1787 census.

The property was destroyed in the Copenhagen Fire of 1795, together with most of the other buildings in the area. The present building on the site was constructed in 1796-1797 for brewer Carl Adolph Frost.

=== 19th century ===
The building was not long after its construction sold to court bookprinter Nicolaus Møller. His property was home to four households at the 1801 census. Wendelia Christiane Lovise [Møller], the owner's son, was also a resident in the building. He lived there with his wife Anna Sophie Seyfart, their five children (aged 2 to 11), the wife's sister Anne Marie Frideriche Seyfart, the literatus Gustav Wemmenhøy, three apprentices and two maids. Another household consisted of overkrigskommisær Poul Terchelsen, his wife Hans Giødert Terchelsen, their seven-year-old daughter Anna Friderica Margrethe [Terchelsen] and the lodger Henrich Georg Tønder. Jens Dreyer, a royal customs officer, resided in the building with two maids. Peder Espensen Møller, a used goods dealer, resided in the basement with his wife Bolette Jensdatter, three children from the wife's first marriage and a maid.

The property was listed in the new cadastre of 1806 as No. 45 in Snaren's Quarter. It was still owned by Møller & Søn (Møller & Son) at that time.

The theologian and filologist Børge Riisbrigh Thorlacius (1775–1829) was a resident in the building from 1804 to 1821. The statistician and historian Frederik Thaarup (1766–1845) was a resident in the building in 1831–32. He had just served as editor of Nyeste Skilderie af Kjøbenhavn from 1825 to 1831. The writer M. A. Goldschmidt(1819–1887) was a resident in the building in 1859.

=== 20th century ===
Harald Carstensen (died 1927) established a sugar refinery in the building on 4 April 1878. The company was in 1903 converted into a limited company (aktieselskab). It was on 1 February 1947 acquired by Axel Kofoed (born 1897).

== Architecture ==
The complex consists of a main wing towards the street, a side wing, a cross wing and a rear wing. The main wing is seven bays wide. The building was listed in the Danish registry of protected buildings and places in 1939.
