= Amsterdamsche Stoom Suikerraffinaderij =

19th-century Dutch sugar refining company

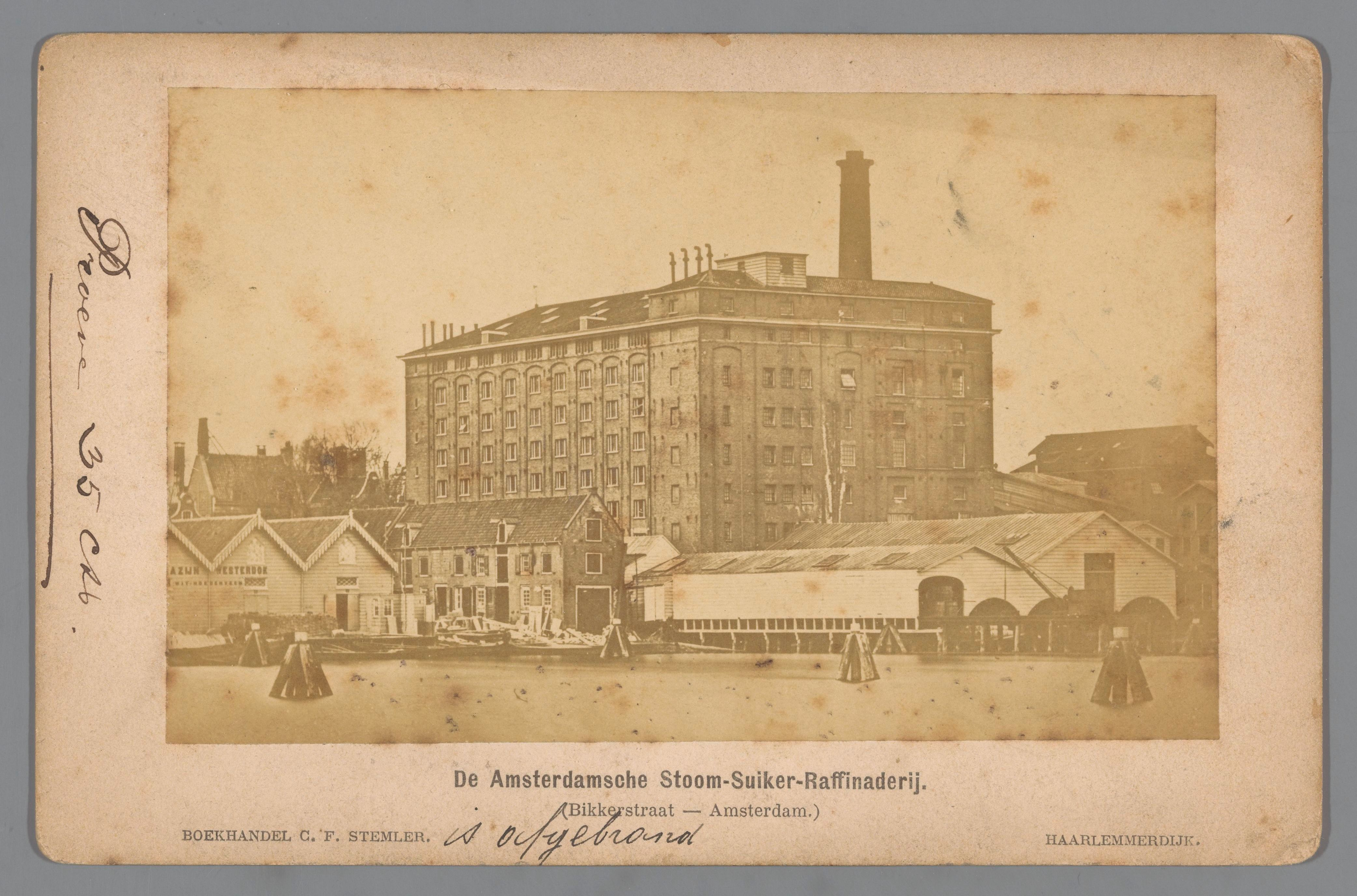
- The Sugar Refinery "Java" before 1874
- Industry: Sugar
- Founded: 1833
- Defunct: 22 March 1875
- Headquarters: Amsterdam, Netherlands

The Amsterdamsche Stoom Suikerraffinaderij (Amsterdam Steam Sugar Refinery) was a big Dutch sugar refining company. It produced white sugar by refining raw sugar from sugar cane. The company existed from 1833 to 1875 and was one of the most important industrial companies of Amsterdam.

== Context ==
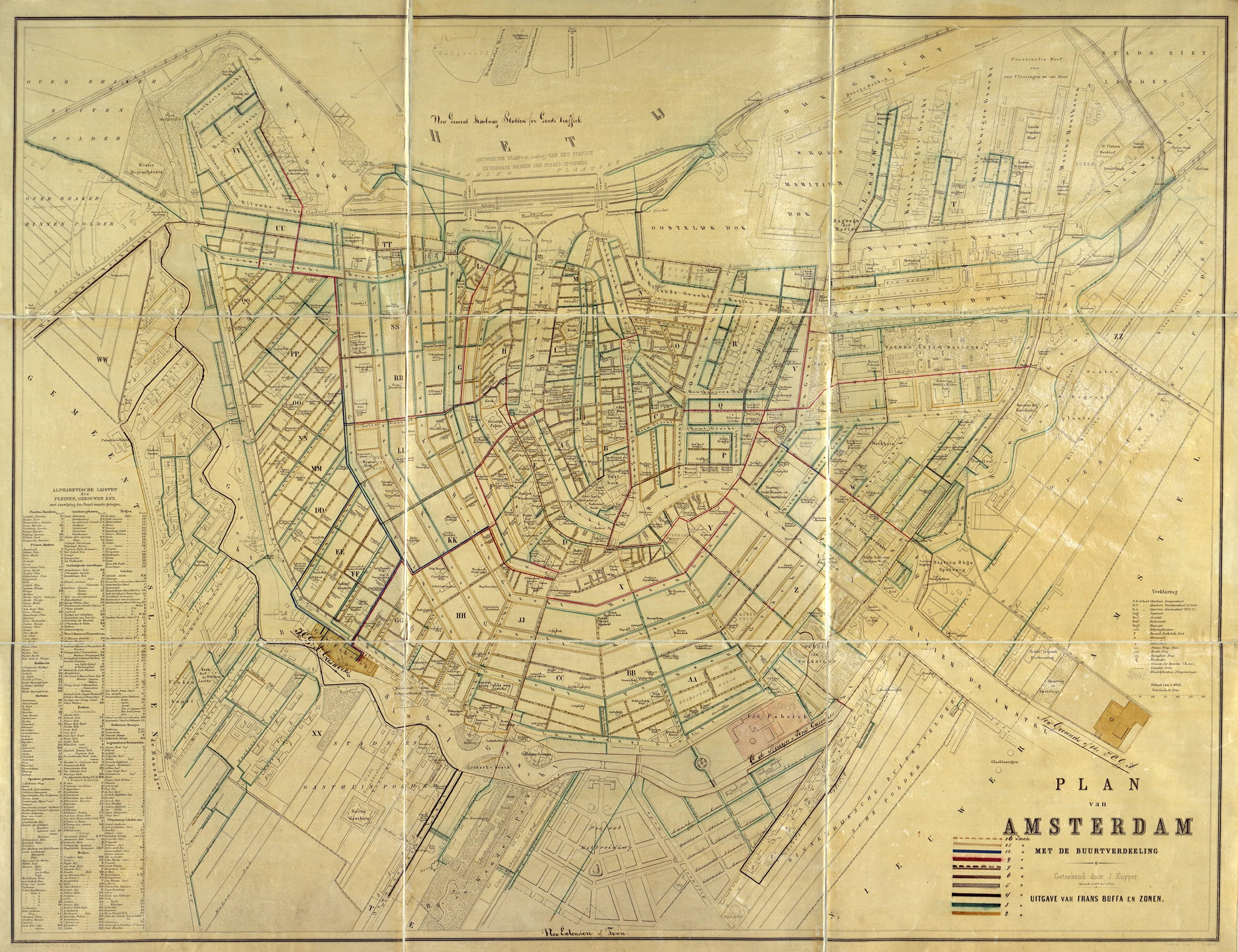
Map that shows the refinery "Java" near the Westerdok

In the nineteenth century, sugar was a very important commodity. Its cultivation was the main driver behind the Atlantic slave trade, which transported slaves to plantations, mainly in the Caribbean and South America. The sugar plantations grew sugar cane, and processed this in sugarcane mills that produced raw sugar. The raw sugar still contained impurities that were extracted in the so-called refinery process. At the time that the predecessors of the Amsterdam Steam Sugar Refinery were founded, the Netherlands had a colony in Surinam, but sugar production in the Dutch East Indies had also become very important.

The traditional sugar refinery in Amsterdam was a building strongly influenced by the highly regulated size of house lots in the city. Many of these measured 9.5 by 47 m. In order to get an efficient ratio between the parts of the production process on such a plot, the standard refinery used four boiling pans and had 4 or 5 storeys. This limited processing capacity to about 600 tons of raw sugar a year. An innovation that could make these small refineries more efficient was the use of tubes that conducted steam to heat the pans. It meant that only one fire could heat all pans, and gave much more control over the process.

The invention of the vacuum pan by Edward Charles Howard changed the traditional sugar refinery process. It required high investments and a lot of space that the traditional refineries did not have. This and other developments led to a type of specialized building for sugar refineries. It had to be located near a clear river or a well with steam pump. It had to be spacious and fire resistant and to have enough room for storage. Above all, it was an almost absolute necessary to allow the sugar liquor so far as possible to descend by gravitation during the different processes, and so to avoid pumping. Therefore, refineries were 7-8 stories high. Raw sugar was inserted at the top, and the refined article was discharged at the bottom. This explains the exterior of the sugar refinery Java, that the Amsterdamsche Stoom Suikerraffinaderij built in 1846–1847.

== Predecessor companies ==
=== Firma M. Udink & Co. ===
Barend Udink (1710-1775) probably came from Enschede. By 1747 he was in a business partnership with a Mr. ten Broeke and was trading to the West Indies. Barend was succeeded by his son Marten (1748-1808), who married Lamberdina Kooij in 1774, and Cornelia Margaretha la Grand in 1778. Marten continued his father's business together with Ten Broeke, which was further specified in a 1785 contract. Marten Udink's name is known from several ship transactions. The partnership with Ten Broeke seems to have ended by 1797. Marten became prominent in Amsterdam. He was a representative for the city under the Batavian Republic (1795-1806), and in 1804 he was president of the Aalmoezeniers orphanage.

When Marten Udink died childless in 1808, he was succeeded by his nephew Joannes Kooij (1785-1870). Joannes was the son of Marten's brother in law Barend Kooij. It is supposed that Joannes already worked in the shipping company by about 1800. On 1 January 1808 a partnership with the name (firma) Marten Udink & Co. was formed. It included Marten Udink, his 23 year old nephew Joannes Kooij, and Hendrik Nijhoff, Marten's 47 year old bookkeeper. Marten brought in 80,000 guilders, and Joannes Kooij and Hendrik Nijhoff each 40,000, which they borrowed from Marten. It is supposed that Kooij and Nijhoff used the profits to gain complete ownership of the partnership, while retaining the name.

Traces of M. Udink & Co.'s activities are found in 1821, when the frigate Vrederijk sailed to Berbice and potential passengers could address themselves to M. Udink & Co. In 1828 and 1833 the coppered frigates Marco Bozzaris (1824) and Zeemanshoop (1826) were mentioned as managed by the firm. In 1834 Admiraal de Ruyter built at De Oranjeboom was mentioned as belonging to the firm.

The activities of M. Udink & Co. were not strictly limited to shipping. In 1824, it offered to sell a small part of a coffee plantation in Surinam. In 1829 M. Udink & Co. participated for 2,000 guilders in the foundation of the Nederlandsche Zee Assurantie Maatschappij. On 1 January 1834 Joannes Kooij became a managing director of the Netherlands Trading Society, which was a very profitable position.

== The business of Barend Kooij Joanneszoon (1834-1855) ==
=== Barend Kooij joins the shipping company ===
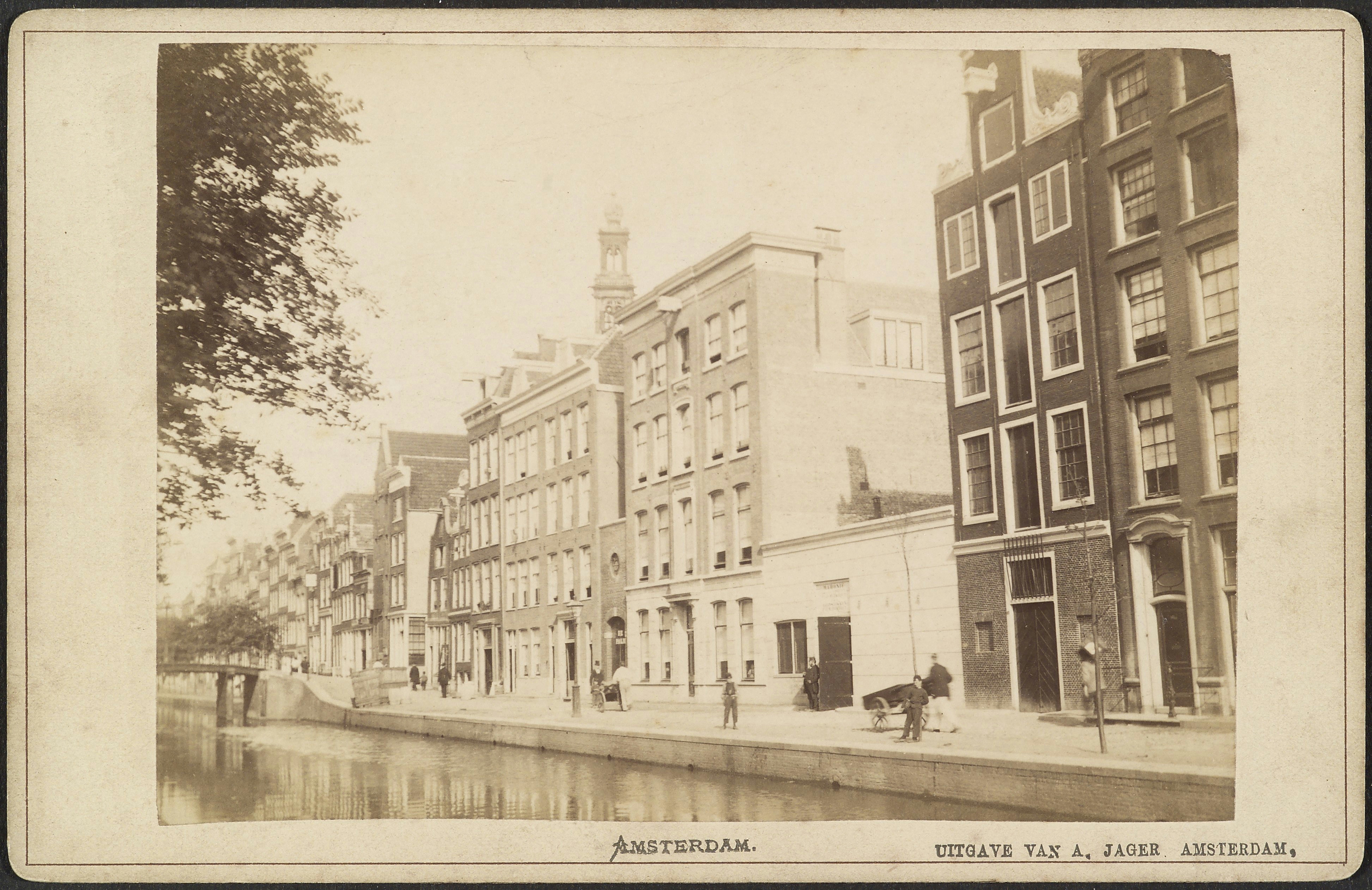
Bloemgracht 53-71

On 1 January 1834 Barend Kooij Joanneszoon (1814-1855) became a partner in M. Udink & Co. The reason for becoming a partner at such a young age was that his father could no longer be officially involved in such a business after becoming a director of the Netherlands Trading Society. Udink & Co. now entered a phase of great expansion. It ordered the construction of the big ships Neptunes, Admiraal Jan Evertsen, Triton, Sara Alida Maria, Waterloo and Philips van Marnix. By 1841, Kooij. was the biggest Amsterdam shipping company sailing to the Dutch East Indies.

In 1839 Hendrik Nijhoff died, and on 24 February 1840 his widow died. After some time, the partnership M. Udink & Co. was then dissolved with a date of 14 March 1839. Barend Kooij Joanneszoon now formally managed the shipping company on his own, but was no doubt still assisted by his father.

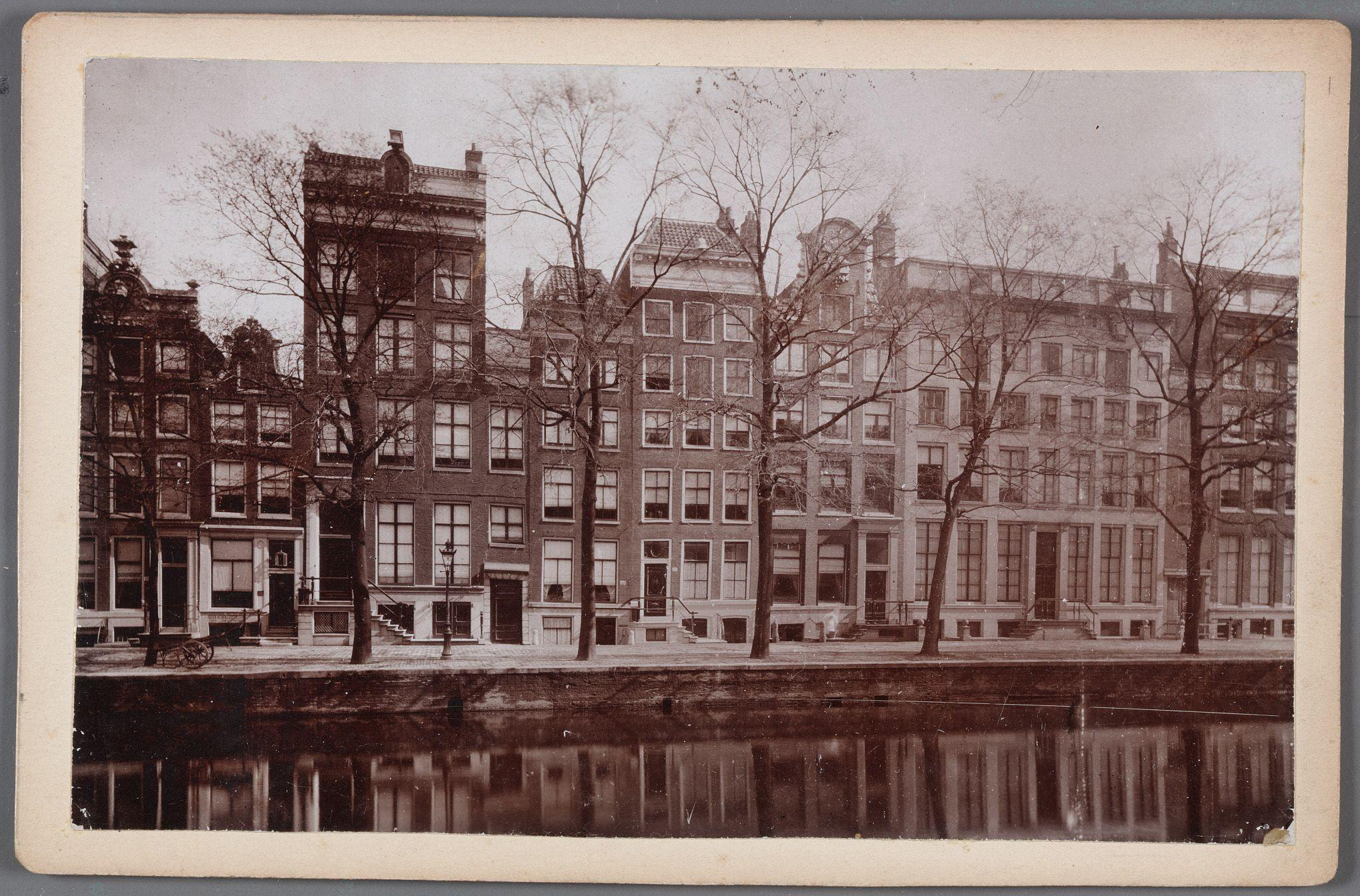
Barend Kooij's 7 windows wide house on Keizersgracht

On 31 December 1843 the president of the Netherlands Trading Society, H.C. van der Houven retired. He was succeeded by F. van der Oudermeulen because the other directors were said to lack the required skills. For Joannes Kooij this must have been a disappointment. He also came into conflict with Van der Oudermeulen on the subject of his other activities and on 1 January 1848 he retired from the NHM. It is supposed that Joannes Kooij was then again more effectively involved in the shipping and trading business.

Like his father, Barend Kooij was active in several enterprises. He became a member of the Amsterdam municipality in September 1851 and lived in the prestigious house Keizer Adolf at Keizersgracht 203, where he kept a large collection of paintings. In 1846 Barend participated in founding the insurance company "Phoenix". At his death in 1855, Barend had parts in all 10 ships that the shipping company managed or owned.

=== The sugar refineries of Barend Kooij ===
The start of Barend Kooij's activities in refining sugar is not that clear. It is known that he had at least three sugar refineries. Two of these were converted to use steam power and became part of the Amsterdamsche Stoom Suikerraffinaderij in 1856.

The relatively large sugar refinery "L'Union" was situated on the northern side of the Bloemgracht at number 148. It was auctioned in April 1841. In April 1845 the equipment of this refinery was sold, perhaps due to Kooij acquiring the Schoonenburgh refinery in February 1844. The house at Bloemgracht 150 was also part of this refinery. On 21 September 1849 one of the buildings of the sugar refinery "L'Union" on the Bloemgracht burned down. At the time B. Kooy Jz was the owner. In November 1849 the house and the grounds of the burned down refinery were offered at an auction. It did not become part of the public company Amsterdamsche Stoom Suikerraffinaderij in 1856.

The sugar refinery "Schoonenburg" was acquired by Barend Kooij on 26 February 1844. It was located on the south side of the Bloemgracht, (now) number 57. Barend had the inventory auctioned in March 1844. This auction probably had to do with an overall modernization of this sugar refinery. In 1856 it used steam power.

The sugar refinery "De Eendragt" was acquired by Barend Kooij in 1849, that is after he built the probably much more efficient refinery "Java". It was located on the Lijnbaansgracht near the Elandstraat and had an exit on that street. By 1856, a tube connected it to a building on the other side of that street. When "De Eendragt" was acquired in 1849, it already used steam power. It can be traced back to at least August 1841, when it was put to auction. In July 1849 the tools of the Eendragt were auctioned.

=== The steam sugar refinery Java is built ===
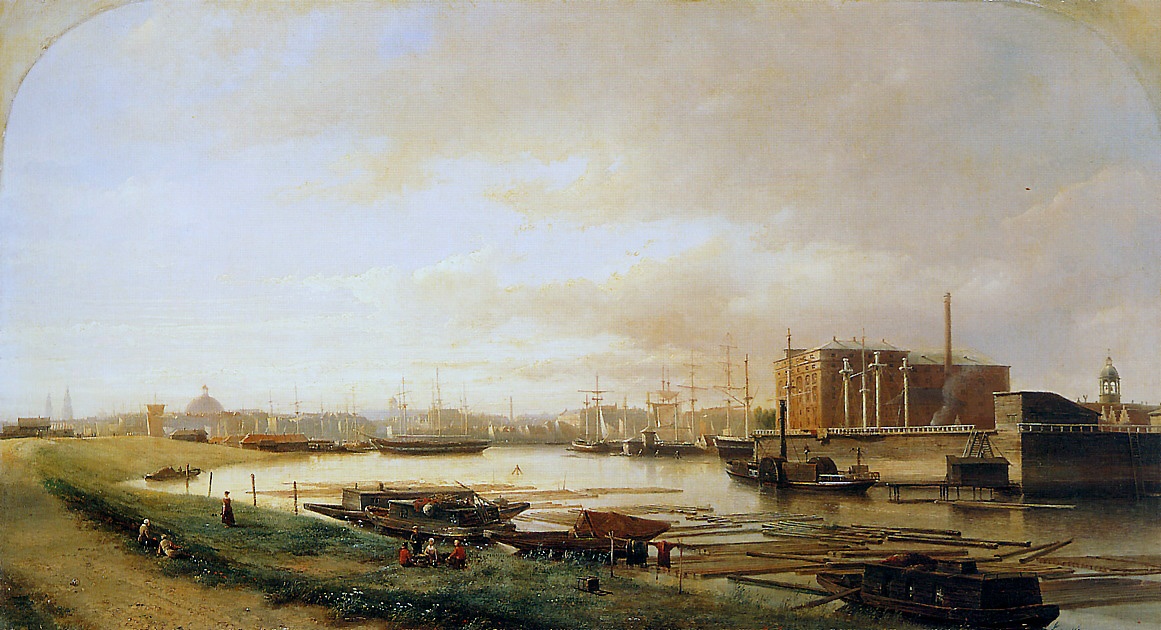
The Westerdok by Kaspar Karsen

The steam sugar refinery Java was notable for being a purpose-built refinery and for operating on a much larger scale than was usual before. In 1846 and 1847 Barend Kooij bought the buildings of the shipyards 'De Oranjeboom' and 'Het Eiland Terschelling' and two houses or buildings on shipyard 'Het Fortuin', all on Bickerseiland in the Westerdok of Amsterdam. He then built the steam sugar refinery Java on these premises. Bickerseiland was situated in the Westerdok, a wet dock that allowed ships to anchor very close to the quays. In effect, the refinery got a pier that allowed ships to directly unload bags of raw sugar to the factory.

For Amsterdam, the sugar refinery "Java" was a very big building. It had a surface of 1,400 m^{2} and 25 m high walls. The construction was tendered on 28 May 1846. The order was given J. Galman and J. Helt for 160,000 guilders. In April 1847 150 construction workers celebrated that the roof was closed. Kooij later got a new 50-year lease of the terrain, which would start on 1 November 1850.

=== The end of the Kooij shipping company ===
After the death of Barend Kooij, his father Joannes began to wind down the shipping business. By 1860 only two of the ten ships were left. In 1868 the last ship was sold. Joannes Kooij died in 1870, aged 85.

== The Amsterdamsche Stoom Suikerraffinaderij (1855-1875) ==
=== Foundation of the Amsterdamsche Stoom Suikerraffinaderij ===
On 15 December 1855 Barend Kooij Jzn died at age 41, leaving his widow S.A.M. van der Meulen with 10 still very young children. On 9 April 1856 a public limited company (in Dutch law a: Naamloze vennootschap) was then founded to continue his sugar refinery business. Share capital was to be 1,600,000 guilders in shares of 1,000 guilders each. B. Kooij's widow Sara Alida Maria van der Meulen took 1,000 shares for herself and their nine underage children. Joannes Kooij (Barend's father) took 170; Johanna van Marwijk widow of J.H. van der Meulen took 100; Joannes Kooij junior, rope manufacturer 100; Pieter Kooij, steam 'kandij' manufacturer 100; 130 more shares were divided over 9 smaller shareholders.

Kooij's widow paid for her shares by bringing in: The steam sugar refinery called 'Java' in the Grote Bickerstraat on grounds of the municipality; The steam sugar refinery called 'Schoonenburg' on the Bloemgracht; Three warehouses called 'Bergen', 'Drontheim' and 'Finmarken' also on the Bloemgracht; and finally the steam sugar refinery called 'De Eendragt' on the Lijnbaansgracht and a connected building close by. All the other shares were paid in cash.

The managing directors of the new company were four: Joannes Kooij Jr., Pieter Kooij, Hermanus Carel Scholten and Isaac Pierre van der Toll. The supervisory board was formed by Joanned Kooij, David van der Vliet and Charles August van Hemert. Directors were obliged to possess at least 15 shares, supervisors at least 10. Every shareholder was bound to a maximum of 6 votes, for which he needed to have 50 shares. This was a measure to protect the interests of the minority shareholders.

=== In business ===
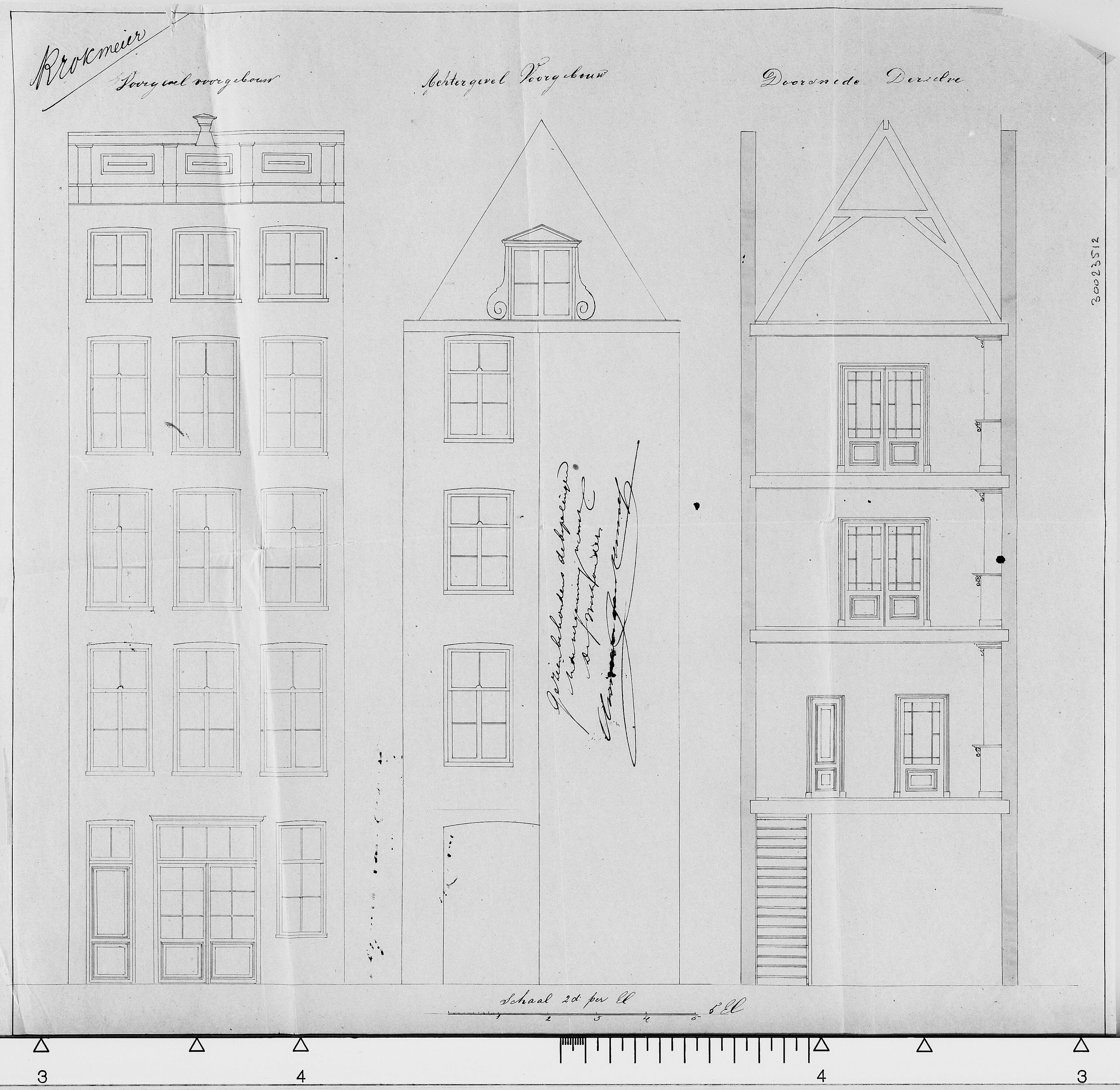
The refinery Schoonenburg was ended before 1869

The first five years of the Amsterdamsche Stoom Suikerraffinaderij went quite well. It paid a dividend of 3% over its first business year, which ended on 31 March. In 1859, 1860 and 1861 the company also paid a dividend. In 1861 and 1862 the Dutch sugar refineries were in general quite busy. In 1861 114,982,232 kg and in 1862 104,966,259 kg of raw sugar was imported. However, prices began to decline in July 1861. The Amsterdamsche Stoom Suikerraffinaderij reacted by letting the "Schoonenburg" refinery on the Bloemgracht remain idle in 1861 and 1862. Official publications mentioned foreign and unfair foreign competition as causing the low prices for refined sugar.

By the end of the first five years, in 1862, there were 20 sugar refineries in Amsterdam. 11 of these used steam power. In 1862 18 Amsterdam refineries processed 76,033,090 kg of raw sugar. The big companies were: The Amsterdamsche Stoom Suikerraffinaderij which processed 16,000,000 kg of raw sugar with about 285 people; The Nederlandsche Suikerraffinaderij, which processed 17,000,000 kg with 340 employees; Wijthoff en Zoon, which processed 16,000,000 kg with 175 employees; Beuker & Hulshoff with 230 workers; and Spakler & Tetterode.

By 1862, the foundation of a handful of sugar factories that made raw sugar from sugar beets was less important than it seemed at first glance. In 1858 a sugar factory was built in Zevenbergen, North Brabant, it employed about 280 people in shifts. In 1861 a beet sugar factory with 5 steam engines and 250 employees began to operate in Dubbeldam. In 1862 a factory with 6 steam engines and 200 employees began to operate in Oudenbosch. Also in 1862, a factory with 60 employees began to operate in Groningen. One more sugar factory was built in Rijswijk in 1861–62. The number of staff and machinery of these factories suggests that they were very important competitors, but that's not the case. In these first years, the factory in Zevenbergen produced about 600,000 kg of sugar. Those in Dubbeldam, Rijswijk, and Oudenbosch each about half of that amount.

In 1863 and 1864, the general situation for sugar refineries became worse because the price difference between raw sugar and refined sugar became ever smaller. In 1864, the 12 steam powered refineries in Amsterdam processed 79,531,950 kg of sugar. The 9 Amsterdam refineries without steam power processed only 1,353,359 kg. Meanwhile, new sugar factories were founded in Bergen op Zoom and Halfweg, these did well. In Delfshaven a new large scale sugar refinery was founded.

In 1865 the overall situation improved. The Amsterdamsche Stoom Suikerraffinaderij processed 13.5 million kg of sugar. In 1867 the situation deteriorated again, but the Amsterdamsche Stoom Suikerraffinaderij processed 14 million kg of sugar. In 1868 the Dutch export of refined sugar increased from 78,407,000 kg to 85,400,000 kg. The Amsterdamsche Stoom Suikerraffinaderij profited by processing 17,000,000 kg and getting good prices. In 1869 Dutch refined sugar exports further increased to 92,962,500 kg. In 1870 most of the French sugar factories ceased to operate because of the Franco-Prussian War. It led to Dutch refineries temporarily operating on new markets and making high profits. The Amsterdamsche Stoom Suikerraffinaderij processed 18,000,000 kg of sugar in 1870.

The good times for the Dutch sugar industry continued in 1871. However, the concentration process had continued since 1856, and by August 1872, only 9 sugar refineries were left in Amsterdam. In March 1872, the company paid a dividend. In November 1872 the Dutch senate agreed to abolish a Dutch Indies tax on exporting sugar to other countries than the Netherlands, the Diferentieel regt. Some feared that it would lead to the redirection of the Java sugar export to other countries.

The sugar market turned against the Dutch refineries in 1873. On Java, the forced sale of sugar to the Netherlands Trading Society had been abolished in 1872. The protectionist export tariff Diferentieel regt was abolished on 1 January 1874 and the British import tax on raw sugar was abolished on 1 April 1874. These measures caused that the sugar export from Java was dramatically rerouted. Comparing 1873 to 1874, Dutch sugar imports from the Dutch East Indies declined from 946,958 piculs to 662,852 piculs. Meanwhile, the export from Java to the United Kingdom and the English Channel rose from 290,071 to 893,341 piculs. The total export from Java was 1,614,780 piculs in 1873 and 2,312,786 piculs in 1874. While the United Kingdom had traditionally been an export destination for Dutch refined sugar, British refineries now began to export sugar to the Netherlands. In 1874 this was only 710,000 kg, but this doubled in 1875. For the Dutch sugar refineries, competing against the much more efficient British refineries was not a good perspective.

=== The sugar refinery Java burns down (1874) ===
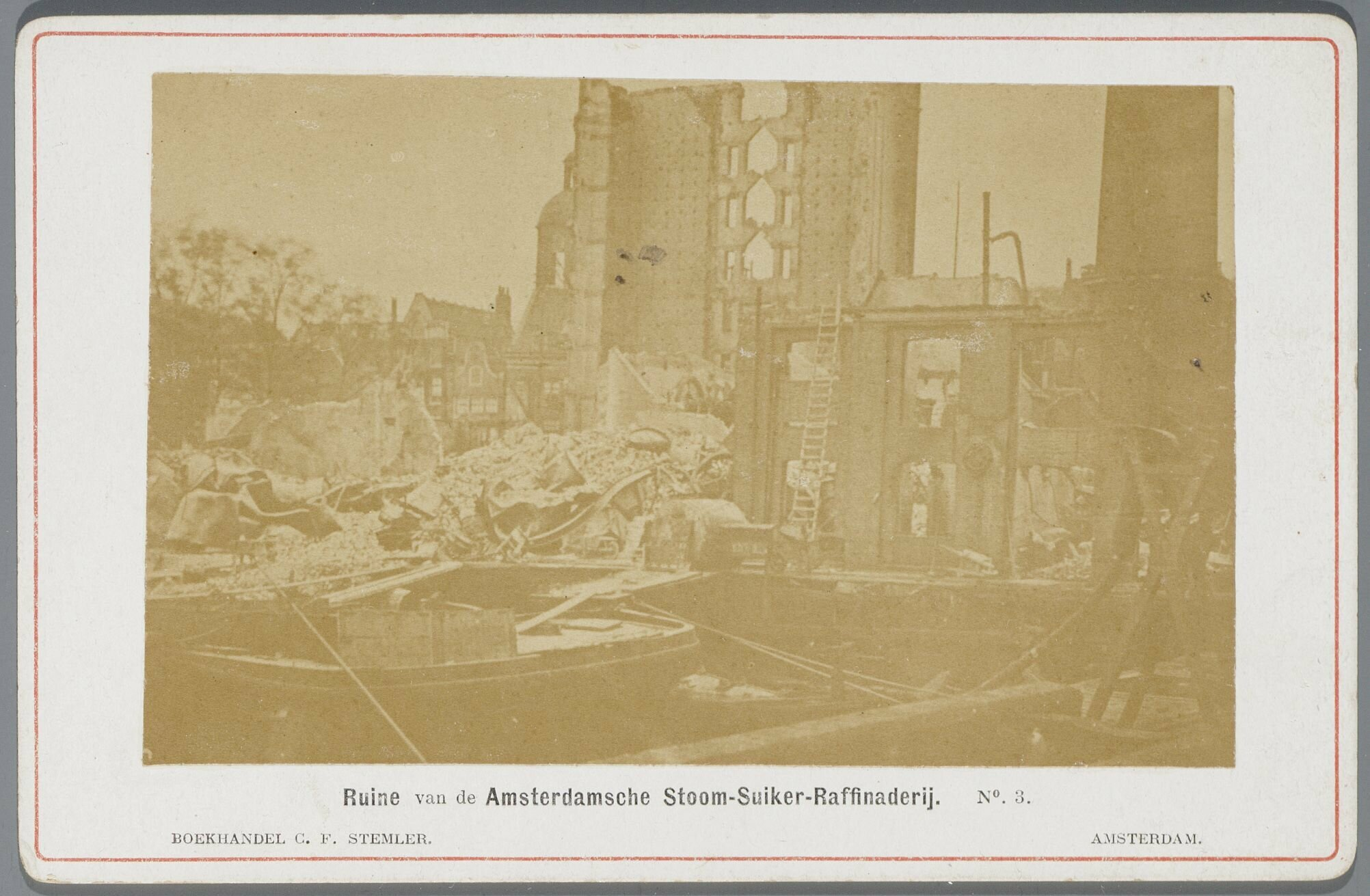
After the 1874 fire

In the night from 8 to 9 September 1874 the sugar refinery Java burnt down. After the fire had started on one of the upper floors at about 1 o'clock at night, it proved unstoppable. The fire department could not do much more than save the office building and other surrounding structures. The buildings were insured for 750,000 guilders, the stock for 600,000, and the annexes for 70,000 guilders. 320 employees lost their job. The bookshop of C.F. Stemler published some photographs of the fire. The sale was one of many initiatives to support the employees who suddenly did not have any income.

In December 1874, the shareholders decided not to rebuild the sugar refinery Java. There were two obvious reasons for this decision. First of all, several regulations had created unfavorable market conditions and there were no reasons to expect that these regulations would be reverted. Furthermore, the lease on the terrain would end in 1900, meaning that the investment in a new refinery would be insecure.

On 22 March 1875 the shareholders decided to liquidate the company Amsterdamsche Stoom Suikerraffinaderij. In May 1875 shareholders were paid 10% on each share. On 5 February 1876 a final meeting was held to close the accounts of the company and to distribute the money that was left.
