= Wetboek van Koophandel =

Dutch commerce laws

Wetboek van Koophandel is a codification of Dutch commerce laws signed into law in 1838 based on the Napoleonic Code that was introduced in the Netherlands during the French conquest of the Netherlands. The law was then introduced by the Dutch to the Dutch East Indies, and has remained Indonesia's commerce law also after independence.

The laws containing regulations about the creation of Commanditaire Vennootschap, Naamloze Vennootschap, Firma as well as another rechtspersoon, shipping and trading regulations and bankruptcy laws. The laws is related to another private law of the Netherlands, Burgerlijk Wetboek and has some elements borrowed from the civil codification.
