= Gondang Winangoen =

Sugar mill and museum in Indonesia

- Established: 1982
- Location: Klaten Regency, Central Java, Indonesia

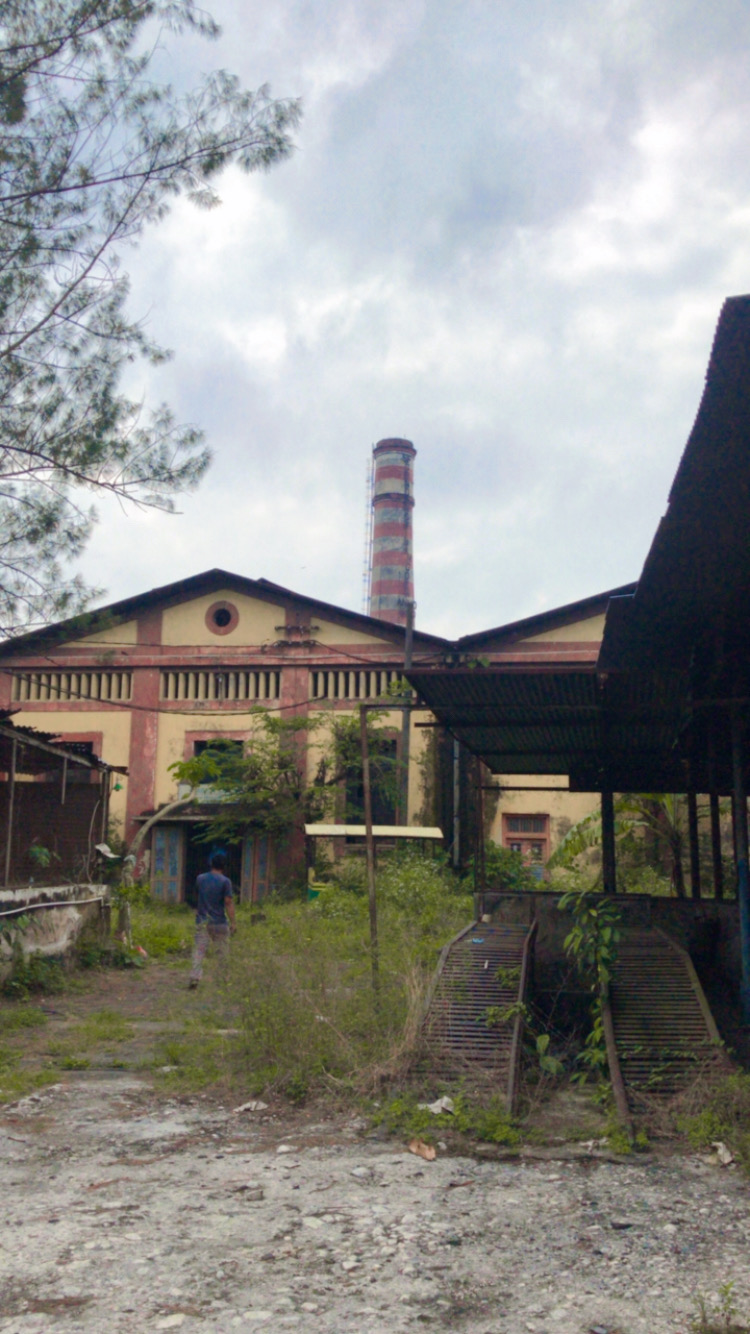
Gondang Winangoen Sugar Factory

Gondang Winangoen or Gondang Baru was a sugar refinery located in Klaten Regency, Central Java, Indonesia. Owned by PT Perkebunan Nusantara IX, it was operated from 1860 until 2017.

It has the one and only sugar museum in Southeast Asia. The museum was founded in 1982 to coincide with the 1982 World Sugar Congress which was held in Jakarta.
