= Lawrence John de Whalley =

British chemist (1853–1937)

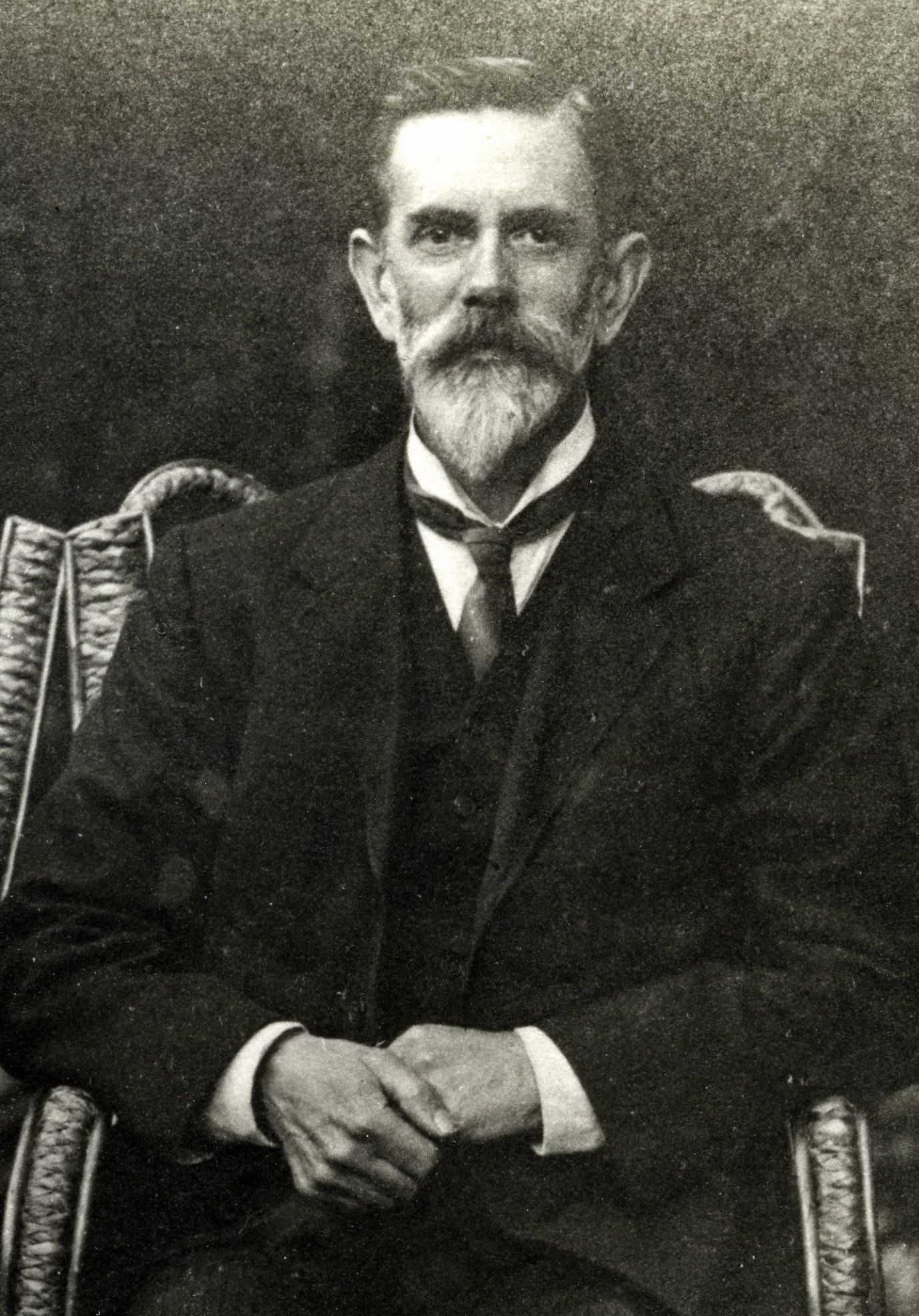
- Born: 11 May 1853; Over Darwen, Lancashire, England
- Died: 9 Jan 1937 (aged 83); Orpington, Kent, England
- Education: Royal School of Mines (BSc Hons)
- Occupation: Chemist
- Employer(s): Abram Lyle & Sons
- Known for: Refinements to Sugar and Syrup production methods

Lawrence John de Whalley (11 May 1853 – 9 January 1937) was a British chemist, noted for improvements in sugar refining, filtration and the manufacture of Golden Syrup. In his industry he pioneered tests including the iron test for sugar liquors and the sulphide stain method for sulphites.

== Early life and education ==
Lawrence John de Whalley was born on 11 May 1853 at Lower Darwen, near Blackburn in Lancashire, England. He was the first child of John Whalley and Jane (née Carlisle). Family background included textiles and paper making. The 1871 census recorded his occupation at age 17 as "cloth finisher". It is likely that the pupil teacher scheme enabled a route to further training and then to university. His academic background and life is detailed in The Analyst, July 1937. In 1874 he was awarded a scholarship (Royal Exhibition) to the Royal School of Mines, London (which later became the Royal School of Chemistry). Lecturers included Frankland, Guthrie, Huxley and Valentin (William George Valentin F.C.S.). An example of student life was his first place in the Boynton Regatta, 1875 (a wading race in the Thames, Putney to Hammersmith in 32m 2s). After BSc graduation in 1877, a lifetime of learning and teaching continued.

== Marriage, home and children ==
Lawrence John married Annie Maria Eastick, daughter of Thomas Zachariah Eastick and Sarah Maria Susannah Kelf. The marriage was on 17 July 1882. By this time, Lawrence John knew the Eastick family through his work with John Joseph Eastick. He is recorded as living in London at several addresses, including Clapham (1881), Lewisham (1882, locally to the Eastick family), Hammersmith (1884), Greenwich (1891), Lewisham (1911, Chislehurst (1935) and Orpington (1937). Lawrence John and Annie Maria had twelve children:

- Charlotte Beatrice Zoe (1882–1969)
- Hermes George Lawrence (1884–1940)
- Aileen Jane (1886–1967)
- William Robert Murad (1888–1940)
- John Joseph Arthur (1891–1973)
- Hubert Charles Siegfried (1892–1964)
- Olga Mary Alice (1894–1957)
- Annie Julia Constance (1896–1976)
- Margarita Thyra (1898–1961)
- Horace Herbert Lewis (1900–1967)
- Enid Sybil Inez (1903–1991)
- Doris Greta Ada (1905–1984)

The photograph in the Info box on this article is an extract from a family group photograph on 13 August 1914.

== Organisations ==
- Physical Society, Original member (1874; note connections via Guthrie. Meetings usually at Imperial College, London).
- Chemical Club (London), One of the founders. Note this is not the same Chemical Club as earlier / later organisations of the same name.
- Society of Chemical Industry, Original member from 1881. Presented a commemoration plaque to de Whalley at the jubilee meeting in 1932.
- The Chemical Society of London, Fellow. (One of the precursors of the Royal Society of Chemistry).
- Institute of Chemists, Fellow from 1911. Note connection via Frankland.
- Freemasons, United (held Grand Lodge of England rank Grand Elected Knight).
- Society of Public Analysts, Member.
- International Commission for Uniform Methods of Sugar Analysis (ICUMSA), attendee & contributor.

== Early Career: Teaching and Industrial Chemistry ==
On graduation, de Whalley became an assistant to Frankland and also worked as a private tutor. When a school in Wimbledon was a potential source of chemicals used in a murder, de Whalley assisted the Old Bailey trial as an expert witness. He was appointed as a chemistry lecturer, then later examiner, at Whitgift School. Ship passenger list records show that in 1885 de Whalley visited New York (probably because Brooklyn was then developing into a world centre for industrial processes). In 1889, de Whalley took an industrial position at an East Greenwich (London) tar works. Continuous stills has previously been used for whisky production and de Whalley made an industrial innovation by cracking (sic) the challenges to apply the process to tar. In an obituary this was noted to be still (sic) in operation and was credited as a forerunner of such plant worldwide.

== Sugar refining and food chemistry ==
In 1890, de Whalley was appointed chief chemist to Messrs. A. Lyle & Sons (later Tate & Lyle Ltd), sugar refiners at Plaistow Warf, Victoria Docks, London. The position had previously been held by his brother-in-law J. J. Eastick.

de Whalley became a notable expert on sugar refining. Although most of his work was unpublished, he inaugurated and perfected improvements in refinery processes and control, particularly filtration and the application of specific tests. He became an authority in his industry on bone charcoal, the iron test for sugar liquors and use of Molisch's test. He pioneered the use of kieselguhr for sugar filtration, and accelerated industrial filtration processes through his research findings regarding the microscopic structure of diatoms. By introducing affination at Plaistow Wharf, he further optimised the production of Golden Syrup.

Internationally, he attended conferences, for example contributing work on raffinose in beet sugars. He chaired the Conference of Sugar Chemists (the Raffinose Conference) in 1910, in Berlin. In 1929 de Whalley signed H.L.Wright's papers for election to the Chemical Society. He contributed to the Royal Commission on Sugar Supply during WW1.

Upon retirement in 1930, a grand presentation was made. He remained engaged in the field of sugar industry research and knowledge sharing, particularly through his children. At the age of 83 he attended the 1936 International Commission for Uniform Methods of Sugar Analysis (ICUMSA).

== Name change ==
From 1882 to 1891 each birth index entry for this family was recorded with surname Whalley. A Freemasons list of members shows L.J. de Whalley registered 1887. The November 1890 birth record for son J.J.A. uses surname Whalley. The April 1891 census shows all the family with name Whalley. In 1892, son H.C.S. was the first in this family whose birth record index uses the surname de Whalley. From 1892, the surname de Whalley was consistently used. In the 1911 census, all the family have the name "de Whalley", filled in Lawrence John's own handwriting. The surname de Whalley had been used by others in the location of Whalley, near Blackburn, Lancashire from the Norman era though the "de" was later widely dropped until this re-introduction. In Norman times the Abbot of Whalley would have been referred to as <name> de Whalley. Medieval government pay records show that soldiers names in the formats <name> of Whalley and also <name> de Whalley were both used around the same times. It is suggested that the de may have been re-introduced by this family to differentiate from the large (and at the time rapidly growing) population using the name Whalley.

== Music and Languages ==
As secretary for many years, then later president, de Whalley is likely to have been central to the "Cheerybles Musical Society" becoming part of the Freemasons organisation, leading to the "Cheerybles Lodge No.2466" which still exists.

de Whalley translated and abstracted scientific texts between languages, being practiced in Latin, Greek, French, German, Russian and Polish. Right up until his death he had been translating technical chemistry publications.
