= Eastick =

Eastick is a surname. Notable people with the surname include:

- Bill Eastick (1888–1914), Australian rules footballer
- Brian Eastick (born 1951), English footballer and coach
- Bruce Eastick (1927–2025), South Australian politician
- Charles Eastick (1860–1947), British chemist
- John Joseph Eastick (1855–1917), British chemist
- Tom Eastick (1900–1988), Australian army officer

== See also ==
- Eastwick (disambiguation)
