= Candi sugar =

Belgian sugar product commonly used in brewing beer

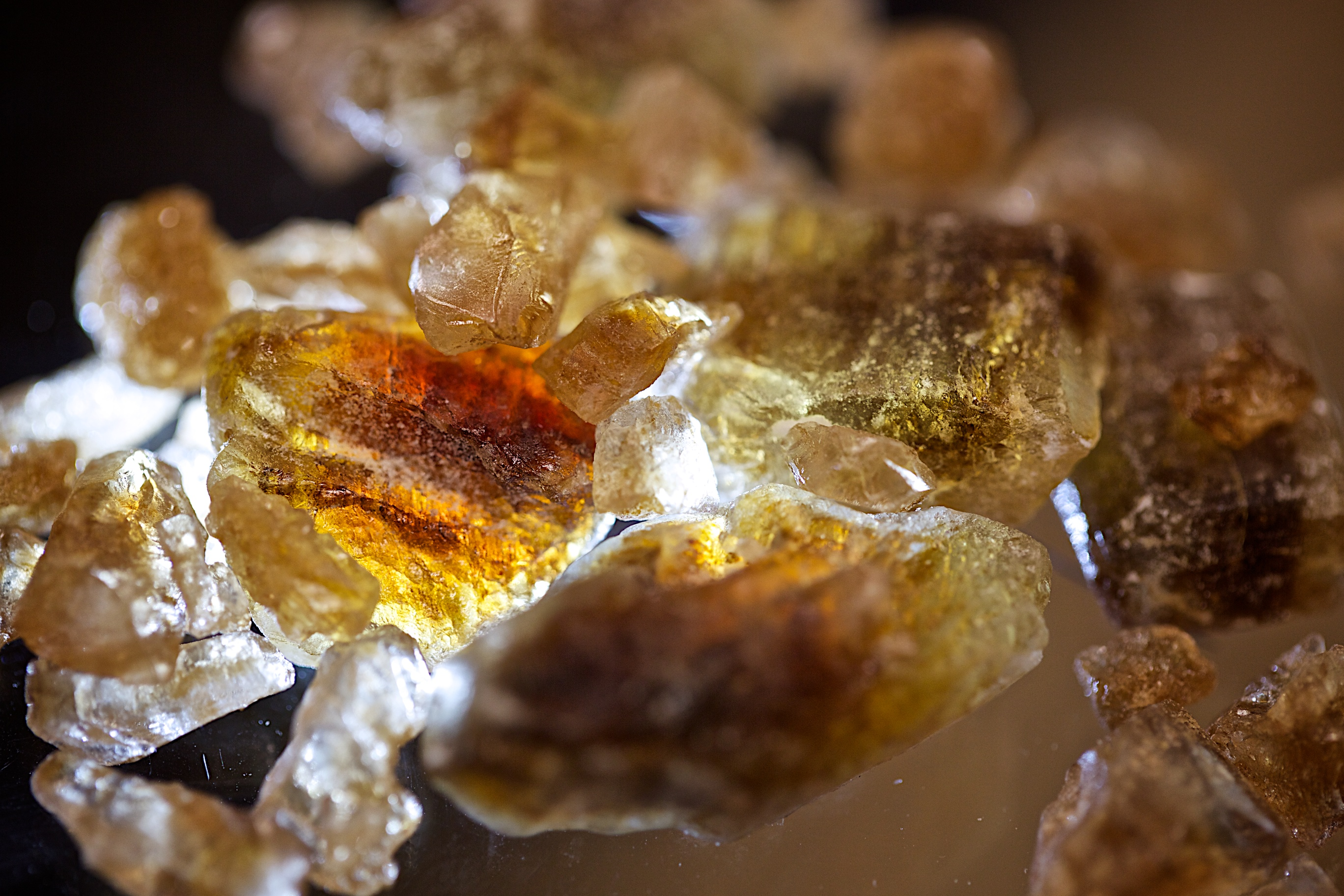
Candi sugar

Candi sugar is a Belgian sugar product commonly used in brewing beer. It is particularly associated with stronger Belgian style ales such as dubbel and tripel. Chemically, it is an unrefined sugar beet derived sugar which has been subjected to Maillard reaction and caramelization. A common misconception is to consider this is the same as invert sugar, while actual candi sugar is subjected to multiple complex chemical reactions during the Maillard process.

Candi sugar is also used as a priming sugar, to aid in bottle-conditioning, and carbonation, with the same benefits as listed above.

== See also ==
- Adjuncts
- Inverted sugar syrup
- Rock candy
