= Anzac biscuit =

Sweet oat biscuit

ANZAC biscuit
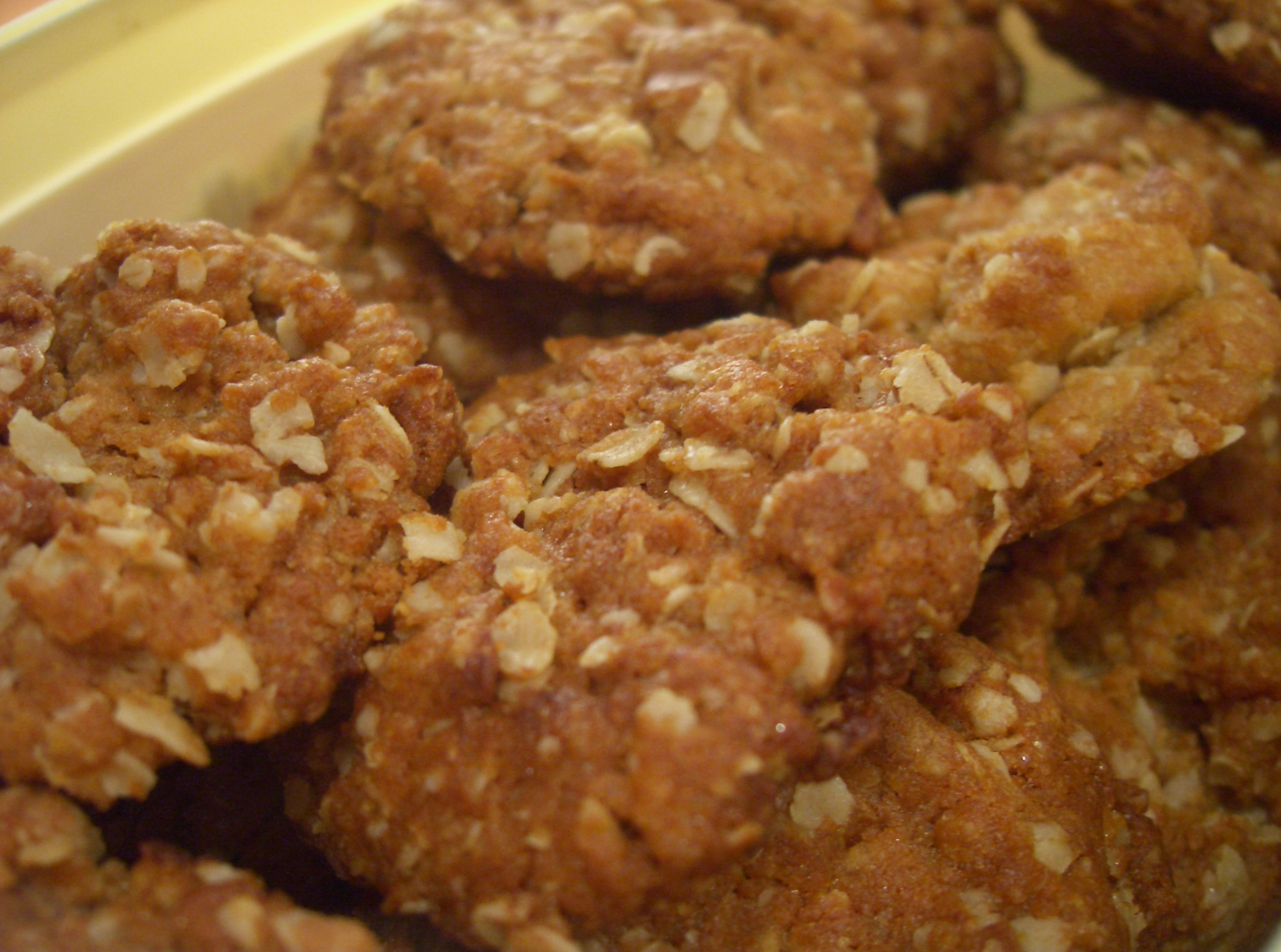
- Alternative names: ANZAC bikkie, Anzac slice
- Type: Biscuit
- Associated cuisine: Australia, New Zealand
- Main ingredients: Rolled oats, flour, sugar, butter, golden syrup

The Anzac biscuit is a sweet biscuit, popular in Australia and New Zealand, made using rolled oats, flour, sugar, butter (or margarine), golden syrup, baking soda, boiling water and optionally desiccated coconut. Anzac biscuits have long been associated with the Australian and New Zealand Army Corps (ANZAC), established in World War I. It is thought that these biscuits were sent by wives and women's groups to soldiers abroad because they kept well in transport.

Anzac biscuits should not be confused with hardtack, which was nicknamed "ANZAC wafers" in Australia and New Zealand.

Anzac biscuits are an explicit exemption to an Australian ban on commercial goods that use the term "Anzac", so long as they are sold as "biscuits" and not "cookies" or any other name.

== Origins ==
The origin of Anzac biscuits is contested between Australia and New Zealand. The first known recipe for the biscuit significantly predates the formation of the ANZAC Corps. Many early recipes differ from the modern version, with some including non-traditional ingredients like eggs, fruit, and jam.

The earliest known recipe combining the words "Anzac" and "biscuit" is a recipe for "ANZAC ginger biscuits", published in the Perth edition of The Sunday Times on 4 June 1916. However, this recipe contains no mention of oats, which are present in modern Anzac biscuits. The first recipe for "Anzac Biscuits" appears in an Australian publication, the War Chest Cookery Book (Sydney, 1917), but this recipe was also for a different biscuit. The same publication also included the first two recipes for biscuits resembling modern Anzac biscuits, under the names of "Rolled Oats Biscuits" and just "Biscuits". A notebook belonging to a South Australian housewife and dating from the 1910s has been cited as the first known source to combine the name "Anzac biscuit" with the modern recipe. Another early recipe for the Anzac biscuit dates back to 1921, published in an Australian newspaper called The Argus. These early recipes did not contain desiccated coconut, which is present in many modern Anzac biscuits. The first recipe for an Anzac biscuit containing desiccated coconut is recorded from the city of Adelaide in 1924.

In New Zealand, a 1919 recipe for Anzac Crispies in the eighth edition of the St Andrew's Cookery Book had similar ingredients to modern Anzac biscuits.

== Current popularity ==
Today, Anzac biscuits are manufactured commercially for retail sale. Because of their military connection, they are still used as a fundraising item for the Royal New Zealand Returned and Services' Association and the Returned and Services League of Australia.

Although Anzac biscuits are popular all year-round, they are produced and consumed the most around April 25th, to commemorate Anzac Day.

A British (though still Australian-produced) version of the Anzac biscuit, supporting the Royal British Legion, is available in several major supermarket chains in the UK.

== Legal issues ==
The Anzac biscuit is protected by regulations that restrict commercial production of the product. They must be referred to and sold as Anzac "biscuits" or "slices" and never as "cookies". While it is legally acceptable to substitute ingredients in a recipe to cater to dietary requirements, there is a commercial disallowance for any substantial modification of the recipe such that they deviate too far from traditional Anzac biscuit recipes. Variations of recipes posted on social media or written in cookbooks that merely include Anzac biscuits are excluded from regulations.

As a result of the restrictions on the recipe, the Subway chain of restaurants dropped the biscuit from their menu in September 2008. After being ordered by the Department of Veterans' Affairs to bake the biscuits according to the original recipe, Subway decided not to continue to offer the biscuit, as they found that their supplier was unable to develop a cost-effective means of duplicating the recipe. Between 7 April 2025 and 4 May 2025, the Anzac biscuit returned to the Subway menu for a limited-time offering raising funds for veteran welfare and support programs.
