= International Commission for Uniform Methods of Sugar Analysis =

The International Commission for Uniform Methods of Sugar Analysis (ICUMSA) is an international standards body, founded in 1897, that publishes detailed laboratory procedures for the analysis of sugar.

The ICUMSA Methods Book contains detailed instructions for analyzing raw, cane, white, beet, molasses, plantation white and specialty sugars. Among these are methods for determination of dry solids content by polarimetry, densimetry and refractometry, color (extinction coefficient at 420 nm), reducing sugars, and the presence of metals such as arsenic and copper. The Methods Book also contains polynomials and tables (derived from the polynomials) which relate the refractive index of solutions of pure sucrose, glucose, fructose and invert sugar to the strength of those solutions. These are to be used with the analysis methods that characterize sugars by refractometric means but find wide application outside the sugar industry as the sucrose polynomial is built into the firmware of modern refractometers and is the basis for calibration of purely optical refractometers which read in Brix. Temperature correction factors, also derived from the polynomials, are the basis for the Automatic Temperature Compensation features found in those instruments. Thus, a vintner measuring the Brix of juice from his grapes by means of a refractometer accepts a sugar content reading based on the refractive properties of sucrose despite the fact that the primary sugar in grape juice is fructose, not sucrose. This usually does not result in significant error.

The ICUMSA is constituted of representatives from national committees designated by the governments of major sugar importing and exporting countries; the votes of these representatives are weighted according to the amount of sugar their countries import and export.
