= Steen's cane syrup =

American sweetener

Steen's cane syrup is a traditional American sweetener made by the simple concentration of cane juice through long cooking in open kettles. The result is a dark, "caramel–flavored, burnt gold–colored syrup," "deep and slightly sulfurous" with a "lightly bitter backlash." It is sweeter than molasses because no refined sugar is removed from the product.

Steen's syrup has been made since 1910 in Abbeville, Louisiana, by C. S. Steen's Syrup Mill, Inc. Its packaging is marked by a bright yellow label. Steen's has been called a "Southern icon" and essential for "sweet Southern dishes". While Steen's is the best known remaining producer of unrefined cane syrup, a few other manufacturers can be found elsewhere in the South.

Traditional cane syrup has been called "one of the basic flavors of southern Louisiana." The syrup, and Steen's manufacturing process, are described by Slow Food USA in their Ark of Taste as an endangered slow food product.

== See also ==
- Golden syrup
- List of syrups
- Treacle
