= Golden syrup =

Thick amber-colored form of inverted sugar syrup

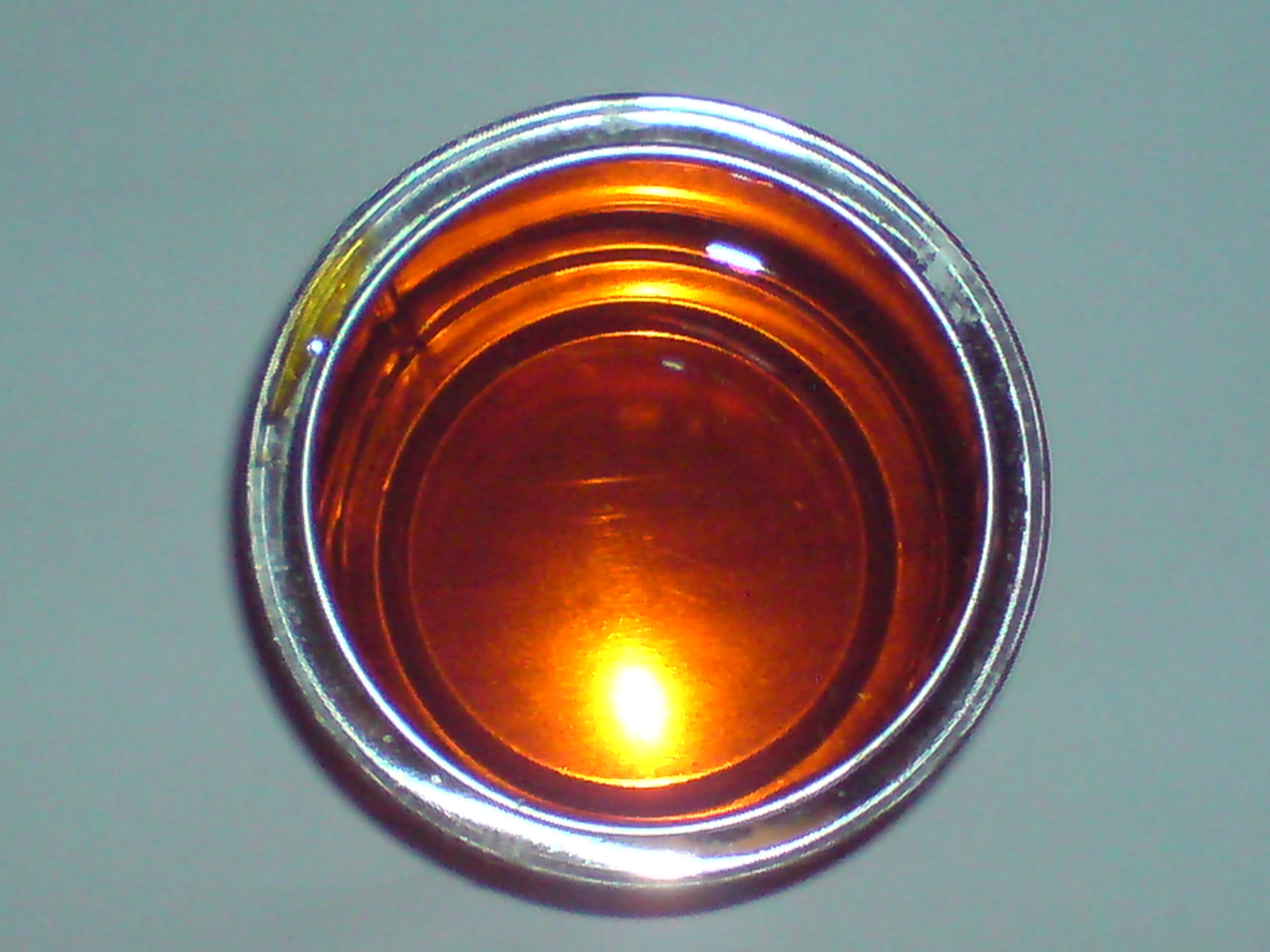
- Golden syrup's characteristic amber colour
- Alternative names: Light treacle, cocky's joy (Australia)
- Place of origin: England
- Main ingredients: Refined sugar cane or sugar beet juice

Golden syrup or light treacle is a thick, amber-coloured form of inverted sugar syrup made by the process of refining sugar cane or sugar beet juice into sugar. It is used in a variety of baking recipes and desserts. It has an appearance and consistency similar to honey, and is often used as a substitute where honey is unavailable.

It is not to be confused with amber corn syrup or amber refined sugar. Regular molasses, or dark treacle (as well as cane syrup found in the southern US, such as Steen's cane syrup), has a richer colour and a strong, distinctive flavour. In Australia, golden syrup was also known as "cocky's joy" or "cocky's delight" through the first half of the 20th century, as it could be easily transported and thus was a favourite of cockys, a name for a small farmer.

Golden syrup was first formulated by the chemists Charles Eastick and his brother John Joseph Eastick at the Abram Lyle & Sons (now part of Tate & Lyle) refinery in Plaistow, Newham, London; their product was first canned and sold in 1885.

== History ==
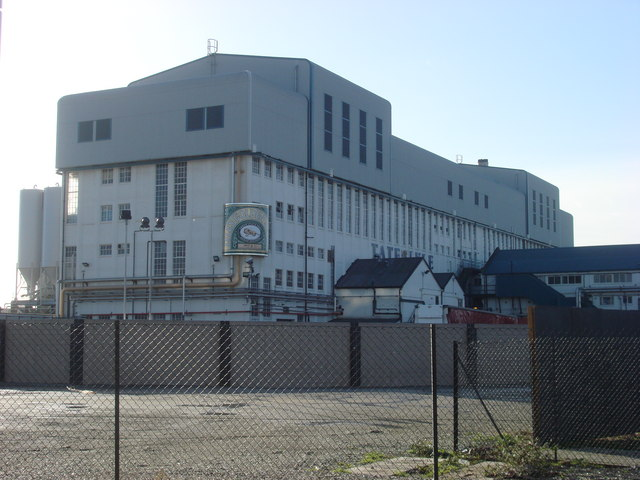
Tate & Lyle syrup refinery at Plaistow Wharf, east London, England, featuring a large-scale representation of a golden syrup can on the nearest corner

In 1863, Abram Lyle, owner of a cooperage, became owner of the Glebe Sugar Refinery in Greenock, in lieu of a debt. He became aware of the fact that a by-product of the sugar refining was a syrup which was usually sold off cheaply as pig-food. He thought that, given some adjustment, this syrup could be adapted for human consumption. His company did well and expanded to London.

In 1883, Charles Eastick, an English chemist at the Abram Lyle & Sons refinery in Plaistow, east London, further formulated how sugar could be refined to make a preserve and sweetener for cooking, bringing it to its current recipe. Charles and his brother John Joseph Eastick experimented with the refining process of the bitter molasses-brown treacle—hitherto a waste by-product of sugar refining—into an eminently palatable syrup with the viscosity, hue, and sweetness of honey. The resulting product was marketed commercially in 1885 as "golden syrup". The name "golden syrup" in connection with molasses had occurred, however, as early as 1840 in an Adelaide newspaper, the South Australian.

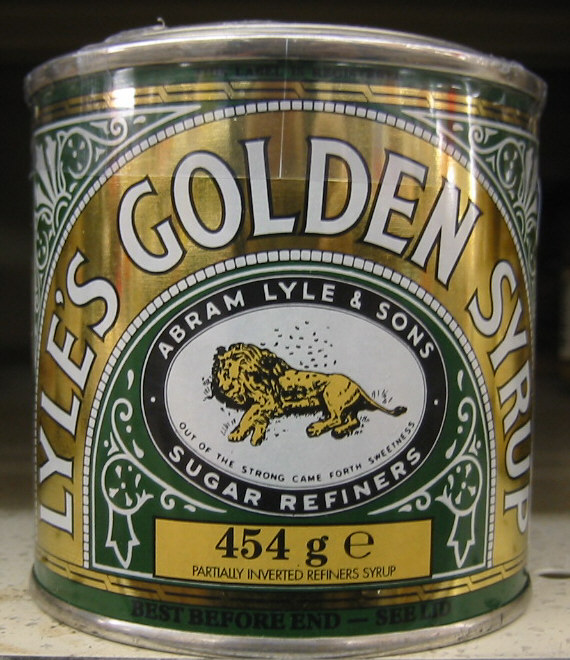
A tin of Lyle's Golden Syrup, first sold in 1885. Recognised by Guinness World Records as having the world's oldest branding and packaging.

The tin bears a picture of the rotting carcass of a lion with a swarm of bees and the advertising slogan "Out of the strong came forth sweetness". The slogan, chosen by Abram Lyle, is a reference to the Biblical story in chapter 14 of the Book of Judges in which Samson was travelling to the land of the Philistines in search of a wife. During the journey he killed a lion, and when he passed the same spot on his return he noticed that a swarm of bees had formed a comb of honey in the carcass. Samson later turned this into a riddle at a wedding: "Out of the eater came forth meat and out of the strong came forth sweetness". While it is not known exactly why this image and slogan were chosen, Abram Lyle was a deeply religious man, and it has been suggested that they refer either to the strength of the Lyle company or the tins in which golden syrup is sold, or simply to the process of refining sweet syrup from bitter ("strong") treacle. In 1904, they were registered together as a trademark, and in 2006 Guinness World Records declared the mark to be the world's oldest branding and packaging. Lyle's golden syrup was awarded a Royal Warrant in 1911.

In 1921, Lyle's business merged with Tate, a sugar-refining firm founded by Sir Henry Tate in 1859, to become Tate & Lyle. In 2010, Tate & Lyle sold its sugar refining and golden syrup business to American Sugar Refining.

Originally, golden syrup was a product made at the white sugar refinery from the recovered mother liquor (recovered molasses) "washed" off the raw sugar crystals in the process of creating white sugar. This liquor is generally known as refiner's return syrup. Today most golden syrups are produced by a specialist manufacturer by inverting half the refiner's return syrup to fructose and glucose and blending it back again; this ensures the product remains liquid and will never re-crystallise.

== Production ==
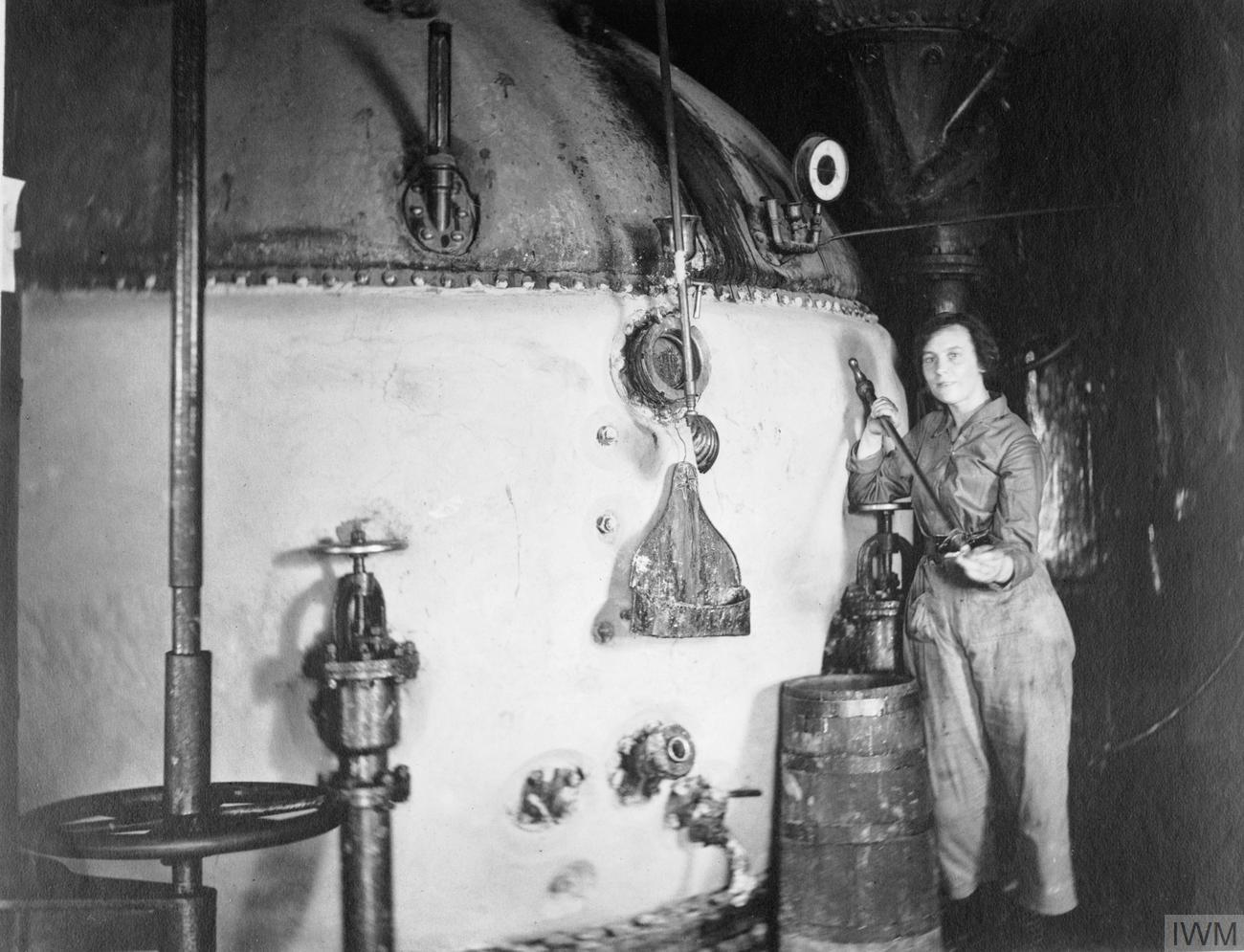
A worker of A. Lyle and Sons Ltd. attending the vacuum pans, producing golden syrup, during World War I

The free glucose and fructose present in golden syrups are more water-soluble than the original sucrose. As a result, golden syrups are less likely to crystallize than a pure sucrose syrup. The free fructose content gives the syrup a taste sweeter than that of an equivalent solution of white sugar; when substituting golden syrup for white sugar, about 25% less golden syrup is needed for the same level of sweetness.

The term invert comes from the method used for assessing sugar syrups. The plane of linear polarised light passed through a sample of pure sucrose solution is rotated to the right. As the solution is converted to a mixture of sucrose, fructose and glucose, the angle of rotation reduces, through zero and then increases in the opposite direction, thus the direction appears to have been inverted compared to light passed through the sucrose solution.

=== Home-made ===
Golden syrup is often made at home when unavailable. Water and sugar are stirred over heat until boiling, with citric acid added to enhance inversion of sucrose. The mixture is slowly boiled without stirring until it is thick and amber colored. At this point much of the sucrose will have inverted to fructose and glucose, and caramelization will have created other chemicals in addition to darkening the color.

=== Commercial ===
Refiner's syrup begins as a high-Brix, pale sucrose syrup made from white sugar and water, designed to loosen the dried molasses found on raw sugar crystals. The sucrose-saturated content of the initial "green" syrup impedes sugar crystals from dissolving during the process of washing. The purpose is to mix the green syrup with raw sugar crystals to form a "magma" of 8–10% moisture content at around 60–65° C, which is then washed with water in a centrifuge. After the first washing (often termed affination), the "washed off" molasses combines with the sucrose syrup to generate refiner's return syrup, which is generally re-used several times until deemed spent. The spent refiner's return syrup is sold off to manufacturers for golden syrup production or is sent to a recovery section of the refinery often called the remelt house or boil-out section. Here it is reheated to crystallize and recover the sucrose it contains and that is returned to the affination stage. The final spent syrup remaining after the recovery process is sold as treacle (often called refiner's molasses in older texts).

An equivalent golden syrup product may be made from beet sugar by processing the clarified, partially evaporated beet juice to break down (invert) most of the disaccharide sucrose into its constituent monosaccharides glucose and fructose. In this process, none of the sucrose is ever crystallized from the beet juice. Inversion may be done by acid hydrolysis or by adding the enzyme invertase. This produces a free flowing (invert) syrup that will not crystallize. Typically in acid hydrolysis, the disaccharides are split by hydrochloric acid, resulting in a solution that is acidic; neutrality is restored by the addition of lye (sodium hydroxide). As a result, syrup made by this method contains some common salt (sodium chloride).

== Availability ==
Golden syrup is widely available across the world, made either from sugar cane or sugar beet.

Lyle's Golden Syrup, made by American Sugar Refining under the licensed brand, Tate & Lyle, remains one of the best known UK brands. There are two other UK sugar refiners: British Sugar, which makes an equivalent product under its Silver Spoon brand; and Ragus Sugars, which makes the Eastick's & Ragus Golden Syrup brand.

In South Africa, the most popular brands are the locally produced Illovo golden syrup and the imported Lyle's Golden Syrup. In addition to the classic golden syrup, several flavoured versions are also marketed, notably maple flavour.

In Australia, CSR Limited is the major producer, but it is also produced by Bundaberg Sugar and Smith's.

In New Zealand, Chelsea golden syrup has been a household name since the late 19th century.

Rogers Golden Syrup and Lyle's golden syrup are available in Canada. In Canada, Lyle's Golden Syrup is available in either a glass jar or the traditional tin.

King brand syrup, a mixture of corn syrup and invert syrup, is sold in many areas of the US, often grouped with table syrups like maple syrup. Speciality stores or those with international sections, such as Whole Foods Market and Cost Plus World Market, often stock Lyle's golden syrup from the UK in several different packs.

In Germany, a similar product called Zuckerrübensirup (literally "sugar-beet syrup") is a popular spread, especially in the western part of the country around Cologne. The best known producer is the Grafschafter Krautfabrik which has produced Zuckerrübensirup for more than a hundred years. This syrup is almost always made from sugar-beet; golden syrup from sugar cane is extremely rare on the German market. There are two types of Zuckerrübensirup in Germany, a golden one, similar to golden syrup from sugar cane, and a brown syrup which is similar to dark treacle. The German company Schneekoppe makes a product called Frühstücks-Sirup (breakfast syrup), which is a golden syrup with some added natural flavor to imitate the taste of honey.

In Sweden and Denmark there is both a light and a dark golden syrup, beet based.

== Properties ==
Golden syrup is a Newtonian fluid. Its density is approximately 1430 kg·m^{−3} at room temperature, and its viscosity is 210 Pa·s at 12 °C. It is useful in experimental fluid dynamics, being cheap, transparent and non-toxic.

== See also ==
Syrups

- Corn syrup
- Inverted sugar syrup
- List of syrups
- Molasses
- Black Treacle (popular in the UK and Caribbean cooking, not the same as Molasses)
- Sorghum molasses
- Steen's cane syrup

Other

- Anzac biscuits
- Charles Eastick MBE
- Oliver Lyle
- Treacle
- Treacle sponge pudding
- Treacle tart
