= Adjuncts =

Unmalted grains that are used in brewing

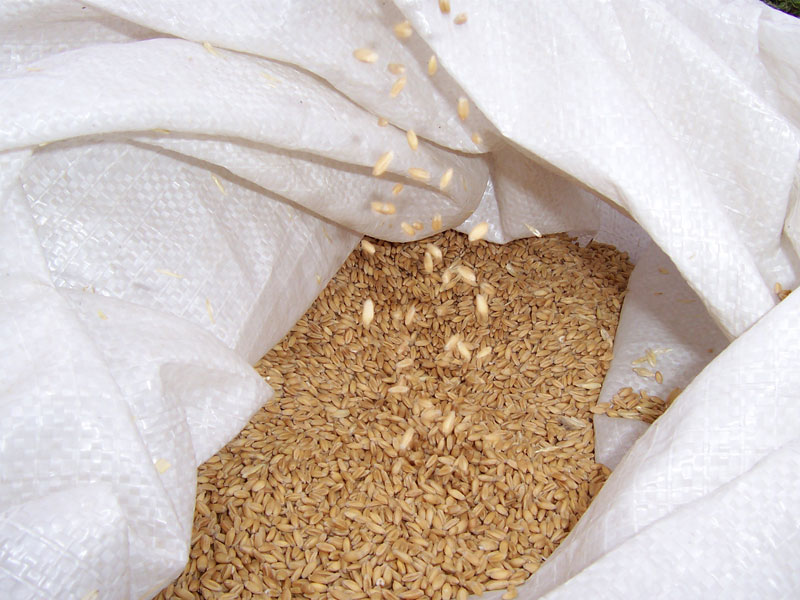
A bag of wheat, often used as an adjunct

In brewing, adjuncts are unmalted grains (such as barley, wheat, maize, rice, rye, and oats) or grain products used in brewing beer which supplement the main mash ingredient (such as malted barley). This is often done with the intention of cutting costs, but sometimes also to create an additional feature, such as better foam retention, flavours or nutritional value or additives. Both solid and liquid adjuncts are commonly used.

== Definition ==
Ingredients which are standard for certain beers, such as wheat in a wheat beer, may be termed adjuncts when used in beers which could be made without them — such as adding wheat to a pale ale for the purpose of creating a lasting head. The sense here is that the ingredient is additional and strictly unnecessary, though it may be beneficial and attractive. Under the Bavarian Reinheitsgebot purity law it would be considered that an adjunct is any beer ingredient other than water, barley, hops, and yeast; this, however, is an antiquated view. This purity law originated in 16th-century Germany and did not initially include yeast due to the fact that it had not been discovered yet.

The term adjunct is often used to refer to corn, rice, oats, unmalted barley and rye. The use of ingredients as substitutes for the main starch source is where the term adjunct is most often used.

== Types of adjuncts and adjunct products ==
Adjuncts can be broadly classified according to the physical form in which they are used into solids and liquid syrups.

- Solid adjuncts are either starchy adjuncts which need to be converted to simpler sugars, or solid sugar adjuncts which can be added after conversion. Solid starchy adjuncts are normally produced from cereals and are used in the form of flakes, grits, flour or purified starch and must be added before the mash tun to convert the starch into simple sugars which the yeast can use during fermentation. Cereals with a higher gelatinisation temperature than the standard mashing temperatures must be cooked in a cereal cooker to gelatinise the starch before adding to the mash. Solid sugar adjuncts include granulated sugar and glucose chips.
- Liquid adjuncts are either sucrose syrups or syrups from a grain (maize, rice or wheat), are added directly to the wort kettle and therefore can be used to reduce loading on the mash and lauter tun and effectively increase the brewhouse capacity. Liquid adjuncts may also be added after fermentation as primings sugars to give sweetness to the beer for secondary fermentation as in cask or bottle conditioning.

== Sources of starch adjuncts ==
Barley is used as an un-malted grain at up to 10% of the grist. Barley provides both carbohydrates and proteins to the wort; on the negative side, the cell walls of the un-malted barley contain high levels of beta-glucans that affect wort viscosity and create haze problems in the bright beer. Barley is also used in the mash as roasted barley to provide colour to the beer.

Cassava is a novel adjunct used in Africa either as a wet cake or as a purified starch.

Corn is commonly used in the production of American-style pale lagers, particularly malt liquor. Corn is generally used in brewing as corn syrup, and as such is highly fermentable. Corn is cheaper than barley, so it is used as a cost-saving measure.

Oats are used in oatmeal stouts. Oatmeal stouts usually do not specifically taste of oats. The smoothness of oatmeal stouts comes from the high content of proteins, lipids, and gums imparted by the use of oats. The gums increase the viscosity and body adding to the sense of smoothness.

Rice is sometimes used in the production of pale lagers, most notably Anheuser-Busch's Budweiser. Anheuser-Busch is the largest North American buyer of U.S. rice. Rice may be used to lighten the body and the mouthfeel, or increase alcohol content, or add a little sweetness.

Rye is used in roggenbiers from Germany and in rye beers from America. Rye is notoriously difficult to brew with, so most rye beers only include a small amount of rye. Rye provides a spicy flavour to beer and dramatically increases head formation.

Sorghum is used in Africa as a local ingredient saving on expensive imported malt and developing the local agricultural sector. Sorghum has a high gelatinisation temperature and is added to a mash cooker to gelatinise the starch before adding to the mash tun. Sorghum has been used for hundreds of years as the main ingredient in many of the indigenous traditional African beers. Sorghum can be used in the malted or the un-malted form.

Wheat is used in German and American wheat beers, in lambic and other Belgian ales, and in English ales. Wheat lightens the body, improves head retention, and provides a tart flavour. Wheat beers are often served with fruit syrups or slices of lemon in the US and Germany.

In England, beans were occasionally used as an ingredient in beer brewing.

== Sugar adjuncts ==
Sugar adjuncts provide only carbohydrates and if used at high levels will result in wort lacking in amino acids and this may lead to poor yeast growth causing tailing fermentations and poor yeast crops.

Primings sugars such as maple syrup, honey, and molasses are common in craft beers and homebrew.

Candi sugar is a common ingredient in strong Belgian ales, where it increases the beer's strength while keeping the body fairly light; dark varieties of candi sugar also affect the colour and flavour of the beer.

Caramel syrup is used to provide colour to brews and can either be added in the wort kettle or at filtration when needed to correct low beer colours. This caramel is not sweet and provides little or no fermentable extract.

Grain syrups (primarily corn syrup in North America) may be made from maize, wheat, rice or sorghum and are normally added in the wort kettle during the boil. The carbohydrate profile of these syrups may be tailored to suit the brewers' requirements and normally have a fermentability of between 70 and 100%. Typically these syrups are 74 to 80% ^{w}/_{w} extract.

Honey is a primary fermentable in mead, and can be used for flavour (though also supplying some fermentable sugar) in beer.

Sucrose may come from sugar-cane or from sugar-beet.

== Flavourings ==
A number of traditional beer styles are brewed with spices. For example, Belgian witbier and German gose are brewed with coriander, Finnish sahti is brewed with juniper berries, and traditional beers in Britain are brewed with honey and spices. Also, some strong winter beers are flavoured with nutmeg or cinnamon, while ginger is a popular flavouring for a range of beers. Many commercially available pumpkin ales are made with pumpkin pie spices without any actual pumpkin.

Spices may be added to the wort during the boil or spices or spice extract may be added at any time during fermentation depending on desired results.

Spices used in brewing include:

- Allspice
- Anise
- Cinnamon
- Clove
- Coriander
- Ginger (see ginger beer)
- Juniper berries or boughs
- Licorice
- Nutmeg
- Orange or Lemon peel
- Spruce needles or twigs (see spruce beer)
- Wormwood (see purl)
- Yarrow

Other, less common flavourings include chocolate, coffee, milk, chili peppers and even oysters.

== Fruit or vegetable ==
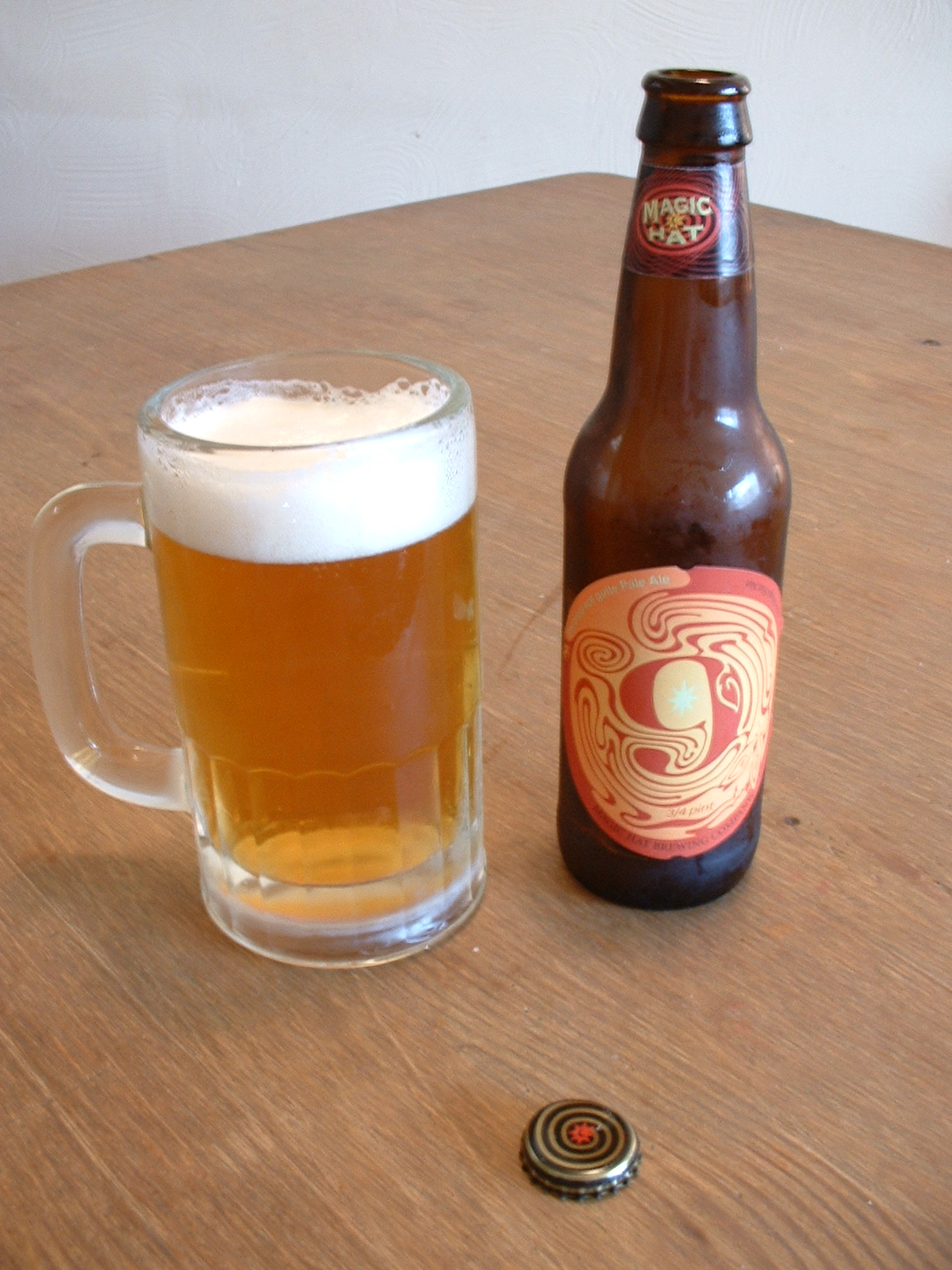
Magic Hat #9 fruit beer in a mug

Beer may be brewed with a fruit or vegetable adjunct or flavouring.

Fruit flavouring and adjuncts

Fruits have been used as a beer adjunct or flavouring for centuries, especially with Belgian lambic styles. Cherry, raspberry, and peach are a common addition to this style of beer. Modern breweries may add only flavoured extracts to the finished product, rather than actually fermenting the fruit.

Vegetable flavouring and adjunct

Pumpkin-flavoured beers are brewed seasonally in the autumn in North America.

Chile pepper is used to flavour pale lagers.

== See also ==
- Beer style
- Brewing
- Gruit
