= Charles Eastick =

British chemist (1860–1947)

Charles Eastick (MBE)
- Born: Charles Esau Eastick; 29 August 1860; Great Yarmouth, England, United Kingdom
- Died: 8 October 1947 (aged 87)
- Education: Owen's College; Royal School of Mines
- Occupation: Chemist
- Known for: co-creator with brother of Golden Syrup
- Family: John Joseph Eastick (brother)

Charles Esau Eastick MBE FCS (29 August 1860 – 8 October 1947) was a British chemist, noted for formulating golden syrup and patenting special methods for making brewers' saccharum and inverted sugar.

== Early life and education ==
Charles Eastick was born in the seaport of Great Yarmouth and was the fourth son of Zechariah and Sarah Eastick. His father was one of the first gas works chemists and manager of Southtown gas works and afterwards at Peel, Isle of Man. When the family moved to Lancashire, he followed his elder brother John Joseph in the systematic study of science at Owen's College, followed by the Royal School of Mines. He specialised in the technical utilisation of scientific results rather than engaging in theoretical research.

== Marriages and children ==
In 1888, he married Elvina Duling, daughter of William Duling, and the couple had one daughter and two sons: Frederick Charles Eastick, Melita Florence Eastick and Douglas Martineau Eastick.

== Sugar refining ==
In 1880, excited by sugar's recent rise into the ubiquity of British life, Charles together with his two brothers (also chemists) John Joseph and Samuel began a sugar analysis and consulting practice in Trinity Square in the City of London. In 1881 Abram Lyle together with his three sons bought two wharves in Plaistow, East London to construct a refinery for making syrup. Impressed by the Eastick brothers' ground-breaking work, Abram Lyle invited the brothers to set up a laboratory at the new Plaistow Wharf refinery, where John Joseph became the first chemist at Lyle's, ably assisted by his brother Charles. Initially the analysis of raw sugar was established for the purpose of establishing price and duty payments, however in 1883 tough times importing cargoes of sugar bring production to a near-halt, so Charles and John Joseph experimented with the refining process, of the bitter molasses-brown treacle-hitherto a waste by-product of sugar refining-into an eminently palatable syrup with the viscosity, hue and sweetness of honey, leading to Charles formulating the first version of the world's oldest branded product, golden syrup. Under the leadership of his elder brother John Joseph the two brothers formulated the special methods of making brewers' saccharum, inverted sugar and golden syrup.

By 1890 John Joseph was succeeded at Lyle's by his brother-in-law Lawrence John De Whalley, who went on to perfect many improvements in the refinery process and control at Lyle's refinery. Meanwhile, John Joseph went to the Australian sugar refinery in Melbourne (and subsequently Bundaberg, Queensland), and Charles left Lyle's to run London's second largest sugar refinery, Martineaus in Whitechapel. During the Great War Charles assumed a national role, being responsible for administering the UK wartime sugar rationing quotas, for which he was awarded an MBE in the 1918 Birthday Honours.

On his brother's return from Australia, Charles and John Joseph continued the analysis and consulting of sugar through the Newland Brothers practice in Dunstan Hill (inherited from John Joseph's father-in-law) and together with their brother Samuel, formulated 11 sugar refining related patents between 1880 and 1919.

During the 1920s, only small amounts of specialised sugars were being imported to Britain as it was not economic for the larger refineries to manufacture these, so Charles saw an opportunity to manufacture brewers' saccharum, inverted sugar and golden syrup for brewers, bakers and confectioners, which led him to establish a specialist factory Ragus Sugars in West London on the new Slough trading estate. At the Martineaus refinery Charles was joined by his eldest son Fredrick as managing director and later by his eldest grandson Bernard, who became production director until a year after the business was sold to Manbre and Garton in 1961.

Charles' youngest son Douglas took over the running of the Ragus operation, but when he joined the RAF during the Second World War, Charles came out of retirement and had time for one last invention, "Golden Shower" crystallised golden syrup. This was sold in grocery shops as a replacement for honey. Charles died two years after the end of the war and in the 1950s Ragus passed to Charles' youngest grandsons Ronald and Barry, and the company today continues to be run by Charles' great-grandsons, Peter, James and Benjamin.
