= Eastwick =

Eastwick may refer to:

== Locations ==
- Eastwick, Philadelphia, Pennsylvania, a neighborhood
- Eastwick (SEPTA station), a railway station on the Airport Line to Philadelphia International Airport
- "Eastwick", a slang name for Elizabeth, New Jersey
- Eastwick, Hertfordshire, a village and civil parish in England
- Eastwick, London, a new town to be built on the site of Olympic Park, east of Hackney Wick

== People ==
- Edward Backhouse Eastwick (1814–1883), British orientalist, diplomat and Conservative Member of Parliament.
- Rawly Eastwick (born 1950), former Major League Baseball relief pitcher.
- William Joseph Eastwick (1808–1889), British military officer and director of the East India Company.

== Entertainment ==
- Eastwick (TV series), a 2009 American television series.
- The Witches of Eastwick, a 1984 American novel by John Updike.
- The Witches of Eastwick (film), a 1987 American horror comedy directed by George Miller, based on the eponymous novel.
- "Eastwick," a 2017 song by Australian singer Julia Jacklin.
