= John Joseph Eastick =

English chemist (1855–1917)

- Born: 6 February 1855; Great Yarmouth, England
- Died: 7 September 1917 (aged 62)
- Education: Owen's College, Royal School of Mines
- Occupation: Chemist
- Employer: Abram Lyle & Sons
- Known for: co-creator of Golden Syrup with brother Charles Eastick
- Family: Charles Eastick (brother)

John Joseph Eastick (6 February 1855 – 7 September 1917) was an English chemist, is noted for being the first chemist at the Abram Lyle and Sons sugar refinery and patenting special methods for making brewers' saccharum, inverted sugar syrup and golden syrup.

== Early life and education ==
John Joseph Eastick was born on 6 February 1855 in the seaport of Great Yarmouth and was the third son of Zacharious and Sara Eastick. His father was one of the first gas works chemists and manager of the Southtown gas works and afterwards at Peel, Isle of Man. When the family moved to Lancashire, he took up the systematic study of science, and gained an exhibition at Owen's College, followed by the Royal School of Mines, where he secured the Associateship in Metallurgy. He specialised in the technical utilisation of scientific results rather than to engage in theoretical research.

== Marriage and children ==
John Joseph married Julia Newlands, daughter of Mr. Benjamin Newlands and the couple had four daughters and three sons: William John Eastick, Arthur Gerald Eastick, Doris Vera Eastick, Annie, Eileen Eastick, Edie Eastick, Margaret Eastick and Lawrence Edward Eastick.

== Sugar refining ==
In 1880, excited by sugar's recent rise into the ubiquity of British life, John Joseph together with his two brothers (also chemists) Charles Eastick and Samuel Eastick began a sugar analysis and consulting practice in Trinity Square in the City of London. In 1881 Abram Lyle, together with his three sons, bought two wharves in Plaistow, East London to construct a refinery for making syrup. Impressed by the Eastick brothers' ground-breaking work, Abram Lyle invited the brothers to set up a laboratory at the new Plaistow Wharf refinery, where John Joseph became the first chemist at Lyle's, ably assisted by his brother Charles. Initially the analysis of raw sugar was conducted for the purpose of establishing price and duty payments, however in 1883 tough times importing cargoes of sugar brought production to a near-halt, so John Joseph and Charles experimented with the refining process, of the bitter-brown treacle—hitherto a waste by-product of sugar refining—into an eminently palatable syrup with the viscosity, hue and sweetness of honey, leading to Charles formulating the first version of the world's oldest branded product, golden syrup. Under the leadership of John Joseph the two brothers formulated the special methods of making brewers' saccharum, inverted sugar and golden syrup.

By 1890 John Joseph was succeeded at Lyle's by his brother-in-law Lawrence John De Whalley, who went on to perfect many improvements in the refinery process and control at Lyle's refinery. Meanwhile, Charles left to run the Martineaus sugar refinery in Whitechapel, London (and later to establish Ragus Sugars), and John went on to run the Australian sugar refinery in Melbourne. For the next four years John Joseph acted as honorary adviser to the Victorian government on beet cultivation and sugar manufacturing, followed by a year in Bundaberg, Queensland where he perfected the operations of Cran and Tooth's cane juice mills. From 1896 to 1906 he converted the Millaquin and Yengarie cane juice mills into raw sugar refineries (through the carbonation process), was general manager for Queensland National Bank of their refineries, as well as three raw sugar mills, several juice mills and surrounding plantations as well as director and chairman of the Bundaberg Distillery and justice of the peace for the territory. In his final year in Australia John Joseph inspected tropical and subtropical agriculture in the East, later returning to England as a consulting sugar expert and chemical engineer. On the death of his father-in-law Mr. B.E.R. Newlands, he took over the well known analytical and consulting practice of Newland Brothers in Dunstan Hill. Between 1880 and 1919 John Joseph, Charles and Samuel Eastick formulated 11 sugar refining related patents, and contributed important sections on the theory of filtration and on filtration in sugar refineries to the English edition of Buehler's "Filters and Filter Presses".
