= Sugar =

Sweet-tasting, water-soluble carbohydrates

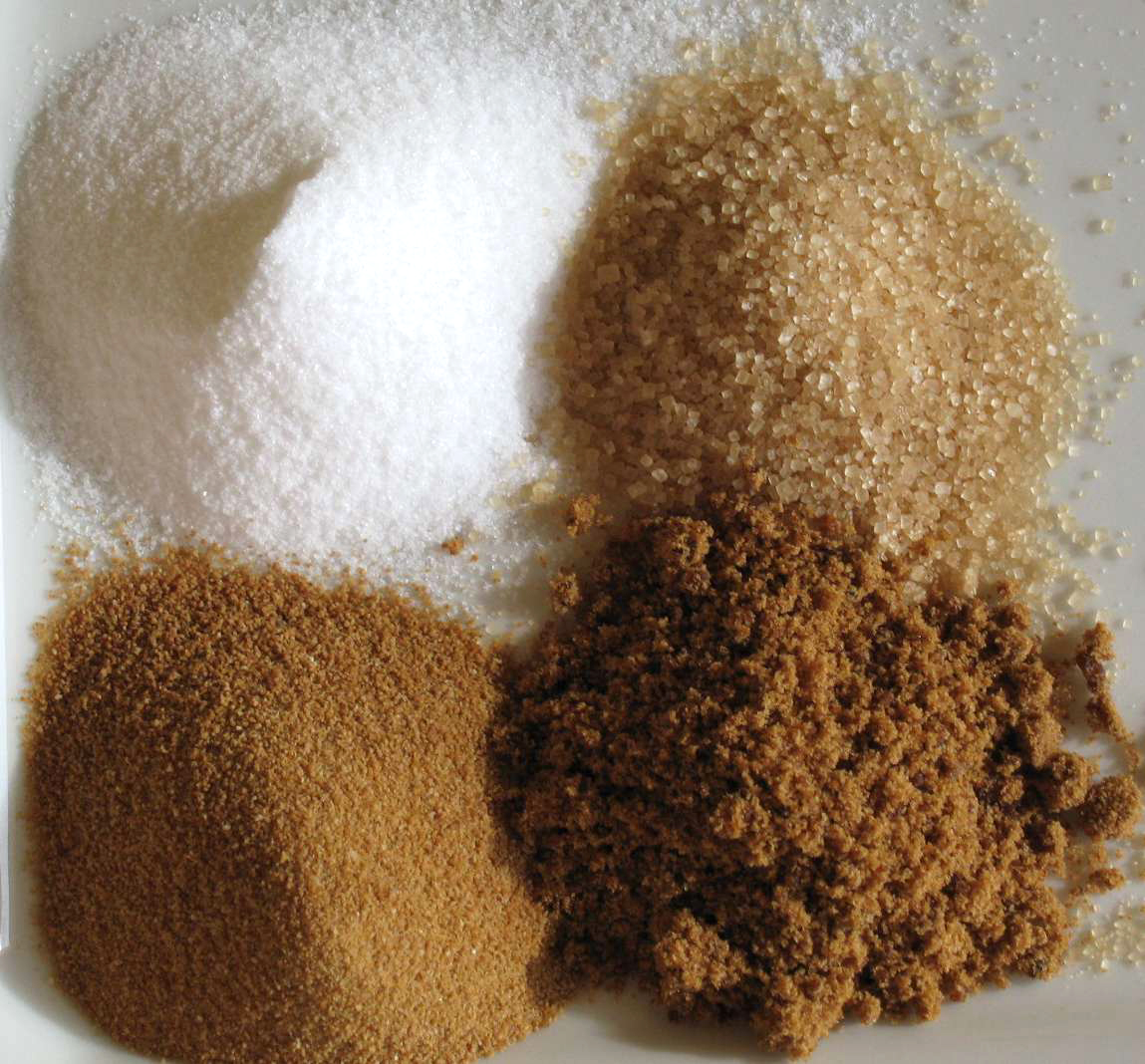
Sugars (clockwise from top-left): white refined, unrefined, brown, unprocessed cane sugar

Sugar is a class of sweet-tasting, soluble carbohydrates, many of which are used in food. Simple sugars, also called monosaccharides, include glucose, fructose and galactose. Compound sugars, also called disaccharides or double sugars, are molecules made of two bonded monosaccharides; common examples are sucrose (glucose + fructose), lactose (glucose + galactose) and maltose (two molecules of glucose). White sugar is almost pure sucrose. During digestion, compound sugars are hydrolysed into simple sugars.

Longer chains of saccharides are not regarded as sugars, and are called oligosaccharides or polysaccharides. Starch is a glucose polymer found in plants – the most abundant source of energy in human food. Some other chemical substances, such as ethylene glycol, glycerol and sugar alcohols, may have a sweet taste, but are not classified as sugar.

Sugars are found in the tissues of most plants. Honey and fruits are abundant natural sources of simple sugars. Sucrose is especially concentrated in sugarcane and sugar beet, making them efficient for commercial extraction to make refined sugar. In 2016 the combined world production of those two crops was about two billion tonnes. Maltose may be produced by malting grain. Lactose is the only sugar that cannot be extracted from plants, as it occurs only in milk, including human breast milk, and in some dairy products. A cheap source of sugar is corn syrup, industrially produced by converting corn starch into sugars, such as maltose, fructose and glucose.

Sucrose is used in prepared foods (e.g., cookies and cakes), is added to commercially available ultra-processed food and beverages, and is used as a sweetener for foods (e.g., toast and cereal) and beverages (e.g., coffee and tea). Globally, on average, a person consumes about 24 kilograms (53 pounds) of sugar each year. North and South Americans consume up to 50 kg (110 lb), and Africans consume under 20 kg (44 lb).

The use of added sugar in food and beverage manufacturing is associated with an increased risk of several diseases, such as obesity, diabetes, cardiovascular disorders and tooth decay. In 2015 the World Health Organization recommended that adults and children should reduce their intake of free sugars to less than 10% of their total energy intake, encouraging a reduction to below 5%.

== Etymology ==
The etymology of sugar reflects the commodity's spread. From Sanskrit śarkarā, meaning "ground or candied sugar", came Persian shakar and Arabic sukkar. The Arabic word was borrowed in Medieval Latin as succarum, whence came the 12th-century Old French sucre and the English sugar. Sugar was introduced into Europe by the Arabs in Sicily and Spain.

The English word jaggery, a coarse brown sugar made from date palm sap or sugarcane juice, has a similar etymological origin: Portuguese jágara from the Malayalam cakkarā, which is from the Sanskrit śarkarā.

== History ==
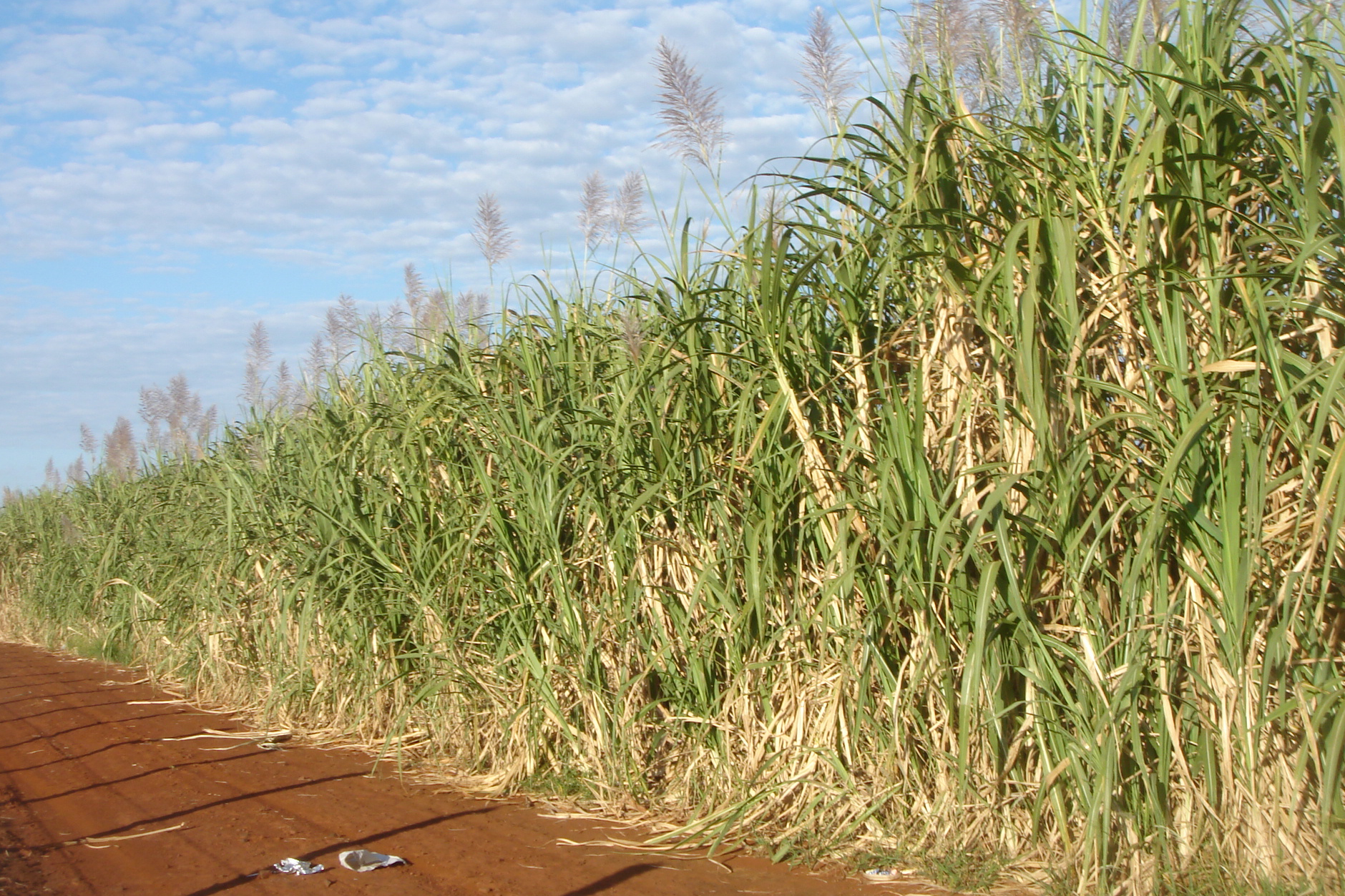
Sugar cane plantation

Sugar was first produced from sugar cane in the Indian subcontinent. Diverse species of sugar cane seem to have originated from India (Saccharum barberi and S. edule) and New Guinea (S. officinarum). Sugarcane is described in Chinese manuscripts dating to the 8th century BCE, which state that the use of sugarcane originated in India.

Nearchus (admiral of Alexander the Great), the Greek physician Pedanius Dioscorides and the Roman Pliny the Elder also described sugar. In the mid-15th century, sugar was introduced into Madeira and the Canary Islands, where it was mass-produced. Christopher Columbus introduced it to the New World, leading to sugar industries in Cuba and Jamaica by the 1520s. The Portuguese took sugar cane to Brazil.

Beet sugar, the starting point for the modern sugar industry, was a German invention. Beet sugar was first produced industrially in 1801 in Cunern, Prussia.

Sugar became a household item by the 19th century, and this evolution of taste and demand for sugar as an essential food ingredient resulted in major economic and social changes. Demand drove, in part, the colonisation and industrialisation of previously underdeveloped lands. It was also intimately associated with slavery. World consumption increased more than 100 times from 1850 to 2000, led by the United Kingdom, where it increased from about 2 pounds per head per year in 1650 to 90 pounds by the early 20th century.

== Chemistry ==
Sucrose: a disaccharide of glucose (left) and fructose (right)

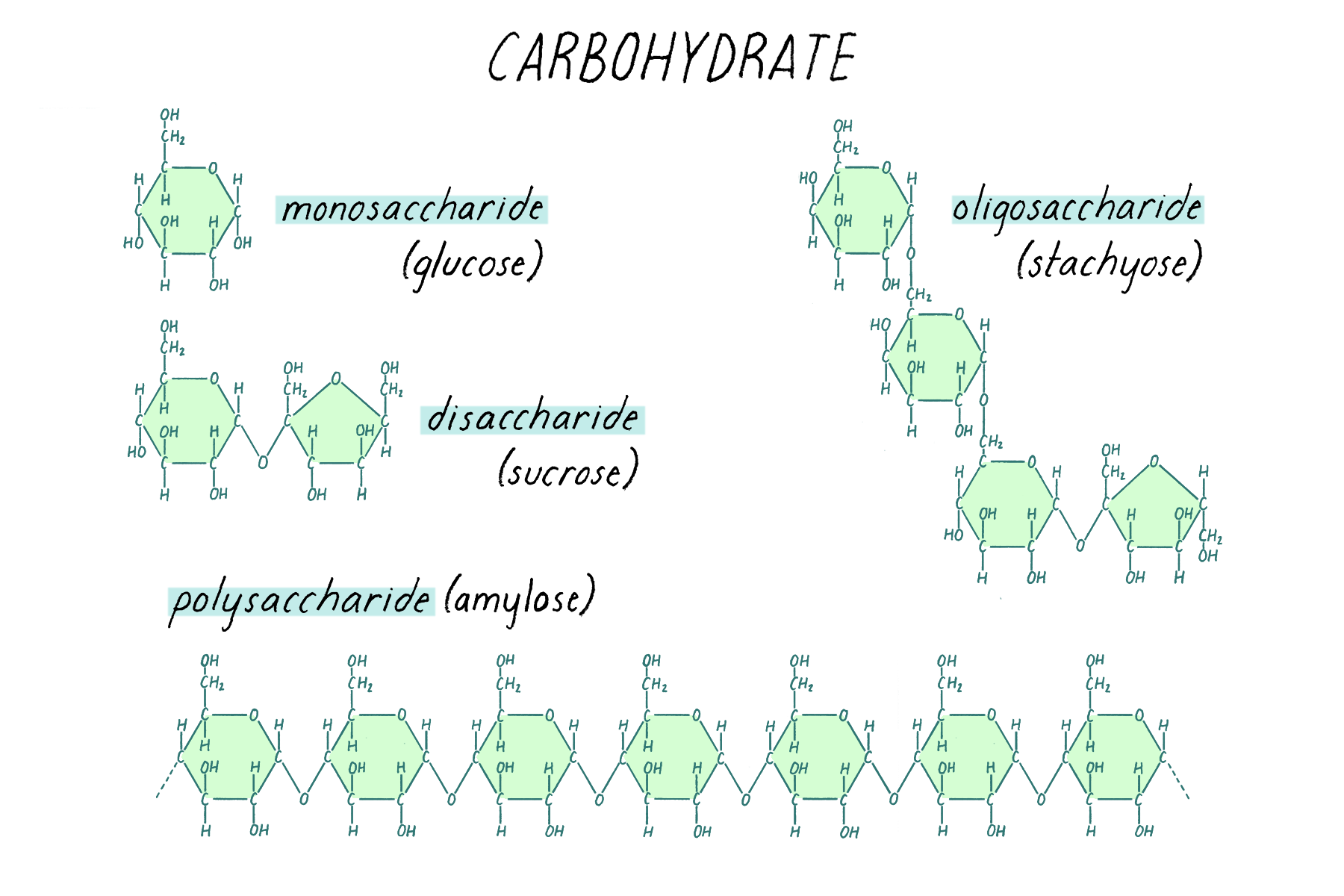
Sugars (e.g. glucose) and their polymers (such as starch, cellulose).

Scientifically, sugar loosely refers to a number of compounds typically with the formula (CH_{2}O)_{n}. Some large classes of sugars, ranked in increasing order of molecular weight are monosaccharides, disaccharides, or oligosaccharides.

=== Monosaccharides ===
Monosaccharides are also called "simple sugars", the most important being glucose. Most monosaccharides have a formula that conforms to C_{n}H_{2n}O_{n} with n between 3 and 7 (deoxyribose being an exception). Glucose has the molecular formula C_{6}H_{12}O_{6}. The names of typical sugars end with -ose, as in "glucose" and "fructose". Such labels may also refer to any types of these compounds. Fructose, galactose and glucose are all simple sugars, monosaccharides, with the general formula C_{6}H_{12}O_{6}. They have five hydroxyl groups (−OH) and a carbonyl group (C=O) and are cyclic when dissolved in water. They each exist as several isomers with dextro- and laevo-rotatory forms that cause polarised light to diverge to the right or the left.

- Fructose, or fruit sugar, occurs naturally in fruits, some root vegetables, cane sugar and honey and is the sweetest of the sugars. It is one of the components of sucrose or table sugar. It is used as a high-fructose syrup, which is manufactured from hydrolysed corn starch that has been processed to yield corn syrup, with enzymes then added to convert part of the glucose into fructose.
- Galactose generally does not occur in the free state but is a constituent with glucose of the disaccharide lactose or milk sugar. It is less sweet than glucose. It is a component of the antigens found on the surface of red blood cells that determine blood groups.
- Glucose occurs naturally in fruits and plant juices and is the primary product of photosynthesis. Starch is converted into glucose during digestion, and glucose is the form of sugar that is transported around the bodies of animals in the bloodstream. Although in principle there are two enantiomers of glucose (mirror images one of the other), naturally occurring glucose is D-glucose. This is also called dextrose, or grape sugar because drying grape juice produces crystals of dextrose that can be sieved from the other components.

The acyclic monosaccharides (and disaccharides) contain either aldehyde groups or ketone groups. These carbon-oxygen double bonds (C=O) are the reactive centres. All saccharides with more than one ring in their structure result from two or more monosaccharides joined by glycosidic bonds with the resultant loss of a molecule of water (H_{2}O) per bond.

=== Disaccharides ===
Lactose, maltose and sucrose are disaccharides, also called "compound sugars". They share the formula C_{12}H_{22}O_{11}. They are formed by the condensation of two monosaccharide molecules with the expulsion of a molecule of water.

- Lactose is the naturally occurring sugar found in milk. A molecule of lactose is formed by the combination of a molecule of galactose with a molecule of glucose. It is broken down when consumed into its constituent parts by the enzyme lactase during digestion. Children have this enzyme, but some adults no longer form it and they are unable to digest lactose.
- Maltose is formed during the germination of certain grains, the most notable being barley, which is converted into malt, the source of the sugar's name. A molecule of maltose is formed by the combination of two molecules of glucose. It is less sweet than glucose, fructose or sucrose. It is formed in the body during the digestion of starch by the enzyme amylase and is itself broken down during digestion by the enzyme maltase.
- Sucrose is found in the stems of sugarcane and roots of sugar beet. It also occurs naturally alongside fructose and glucose in other plants, in particular fruits and some roots such as carrots. The different proportions of sugars found in these foods determines the range of sweetness experienced when eating them. A molecule of sucrose is formed by the combination of a molecule of glucose with a molecule of fructose. After being eaten, sucrose is split into its constituent parts during digestion by a number of enzymes known as sucrases.

=== Polysaccharides ===
Longer than disaccharides are oligosaccharides and polysaccharides. Cellulose and chitin are polymers, often crystalline, found in diverse plants and insects, respectively. Cellulose cannot be digested directly by animals. Starch is an amorphous polymer of glucose that is found in many plants and is widely used in the sugar industry.

== Sources ==
The sugar contents of common fruits and vegetables are presented in Table 1.

Table 1. Sugar content of selected common plant foods (g/100g)
Food item	Total carbohydrate^{A} including dietary fiber	Total sugars	Free fructose	Free glucose	Sucrose	Fructose/ (Fructose+Glucose) ratio^{B}	Sucrose as a % of total sugars
Fruits							
Apple	13.8	10.4	5.9	2.4	2.1	0.67	20
Apricot	11.1	9.2	0.9	2.4	5.9	0.42	64
Banana	22.8	12.2	4.9	5.0	2.4	0.5	20
Fig, dried	63.9	47.9	22.9	24.8	0.9	0.48	1.9
Grapes	18.1	15.5	8.1	7.2	0.2	0.53	1
Navel orange	12.5	8.5	2.25	2.0	4.3	0.51	51
Peach	9.5	8.4	1.5	2.0	4.8	0.47	57
Pear	15.5	9.8	6.2	2.8	0.8	0.67	8
Pineapple	13.1	9.9	2.1	1.7	6.0	0.52	61
Plum	11.4	9.9	3.1	5.1	1.6	0.40	16
Strawberry	7.68	4.89	2.441	1.99	0.47	0.55	10
Vegetables							
Beet, red	9.6	6.8	0.1	0.1	6.5	0.50	96
Carrot	9.6	4.7	0.6	0.6	3.6	0.50	77
Corn, sweet	19.0	6.2	1.9	3.4	0.9	0.38	15
Red pepper, sweet	6.0	4.2	2.3	1.9	0.0	0.55	0
Onion, sweet	7.6	5.0	2.0	2.3	0.7	0.47	14
Sweet potato	20.1	4.2	0.7	1.0	2.5	0.47	60
Yam	27.9	0.5	tr	tr	tr	na	tr
Sugar cane		13–18	0.2–1.0	0.2–1.0	11–16	0.50	high
Sugar beet		17–18	0.1–0.5	0.1–0.5	16–17	0.50	high

^A The carbohydrate figure is calculated in the United States Department of Agriculture database and does not always correspond to the sum of the sugars, the starch, and the dietary fibre.
^B The fructose to fructose plus glucose ratio is calculated by including the fructose and glucose coming from the sucrose.

== Production ==
Production of sugar crops

Due to rising demand, sugar production in general increased some 14% over the period 2009 to 2018. The largest importers were China, Indonesia, and the United States.

=== Sugar ===
In 2022–23 world production of sugar was 186 million tonnes, and in 2023–2024 an estimated 194 million tonnes – a surplus of 5 million tonnes, according to Ragus.

=== Sugarcane ===
Sugarcane production – 2022 (millions of tonnes)
Brazil	724.4
India	439.4
China	103.4
Thailand	92.1
World	1,922.1
Source: FAO

Sugar cane accounted for around 21% of the global crop production over the 2000–2021 period. The Americas was the leading region in the production of sugar cane (52% of the world total). Global production of sugarcane in 2022 was 1.9 billion tonnes, with Brazil producing 38% of the world total and India 23% (table).

Sugarcane is any of several species, or their hybrids, of giant grasses in the genus Saccharum in the family Poaceae. They have been cultivated in tropical climates in the Indian subcontinent and Southeast Asia over centuries for the sucrose found in their stems.

World production of raw sugar, main producers

Sugar cane requires a frost-free climate with sufficient rainfall during the growing season to make full use of the plant's substantial growth potential. The crop is harvested mechanically or by hand, chopped into lengths and conveyed rapidly to the processing plant (commonly known as a sugar mill) where it is either milled and the juice extracted with water or extracted by diffusion. The juice is clarified with lime and heated to destroy enzymes. The resulting thin syrup is concentrated in a series of evaporators, after which further water is removed. The resulting supersaturated solution is seeded with sugar crystals, facilitating crystal formation and drying. Molasses is a by-product of the process and the fibre from the stems, known as bagasse, is burned to provide energy for the sugar extraction process. The crystals of raw sugar have a sticky brown coating and either can be used as they are, can be bleached by sulfur dioxide, or can be treated in a carbonatation process to produce a whiter product. About 2,500 litres (660 US gal) of irrigation water is needed for every one kilogram (2.2 pounds) of sugar produced.

=== Sugar beet ===
Sugar beet production – 2022 (millions of tonnes)
Russia	48.9
France	31.5
United States	29.6
Germany	28.2
World	260
Source: FAO

In 2022 global production of sugar beets was 260 million tonnes, led by Russia with 18.8% of the world total (table).

Sugar beet became a major source of sugar in the 19th century when methods for extracting the sugar became available. It is a biennial plant, a cultivated variety of Beta vulgaris in the family Amaranthaceae, the tuberous root of which contains a high proportion of sucrose. It is cultivated as a root crop in temperate regions with adequate rainfall and requires a fertile soil. The crop is harvested mechanically in the autumn and the crown of leaves and excess soil removed. The roots do not deteriorate rapidly and may be left in the field for some weeks before being transported to the processing plant where the crop is washed and sliced, and the sugar extracted by diffusion. Milk of lime is added to the raw juice with calcium carbonate. After water is evaporated by boiling the syrup under a vacuum, the syrup is cooled and seeded with sugar crystals. The white sugar that crystallises can be separated in a centrifuge and dried, requiring no further refining.

=== Refining ===
Refined sugar is made from raw sugar that has undergone a refining process to remove the molasses. Raw sugar is sucrose which is extracted from sugarcane or sugar beet. While raw sugar can be consumed, the refining process removes unwanted tastes and results in refined sugar or white sugar.

The sugar may be transported in bulk to the country where it will be used and the refining process often takes place there. The first stage is known as affination and involves immersing the sugar crystals in a concentrated syrup that softens and removes the sticky brown coating without dissolving them. The crystals are then separated from the liquor and dissolved in water. The resulting syrup is treated either by a carbonatation or by a phosphatation process. Both involve the precipitation of a fine solid in the syrup and when this is filtered out, many of the impurities are removed at the same time. Removal of colour is achieved by using either a granular activated carbon or an ion-exchange resin. The sugar syrup is concentrated by boiling and then cooled and seeded with sugar crystals, causing the sugar to crystallise out. The liquor is spun off in a centrifuge and the white crystals are dried in hot air and ready to be packaged or used. The surplus liquor is made into refiners' molasses.

The International Commission for Uniform Methods of Sugar Analysis sets standards for the measurement of the purity of refined sugar, known as ICUMSA numbers; lower numbers indicate a higher level of purity in the refined sugar.

Refined sugar is widely used for industrial needs for higher quality. Refined sugar is purer (ICUMSA below 300) than raw sugar (ICUMSA over 1,500). The level of purity associated with the colours of sugar, expressed by standard number ICUMSA, the smaller ICUMSA numbers indicate the higher purity of sugar.

== Forms and uses ==
=== Crystal size ===
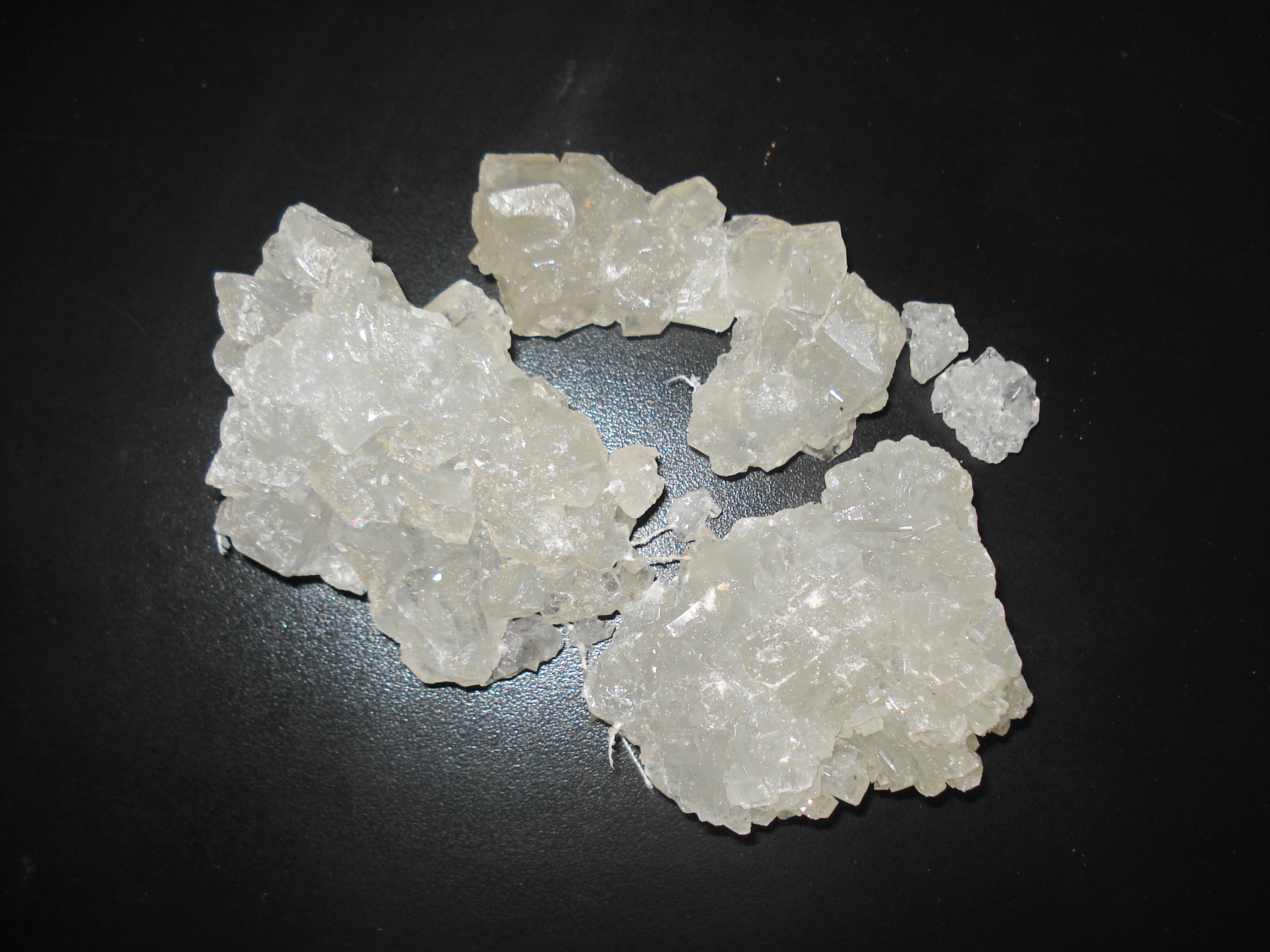
Misri crystals

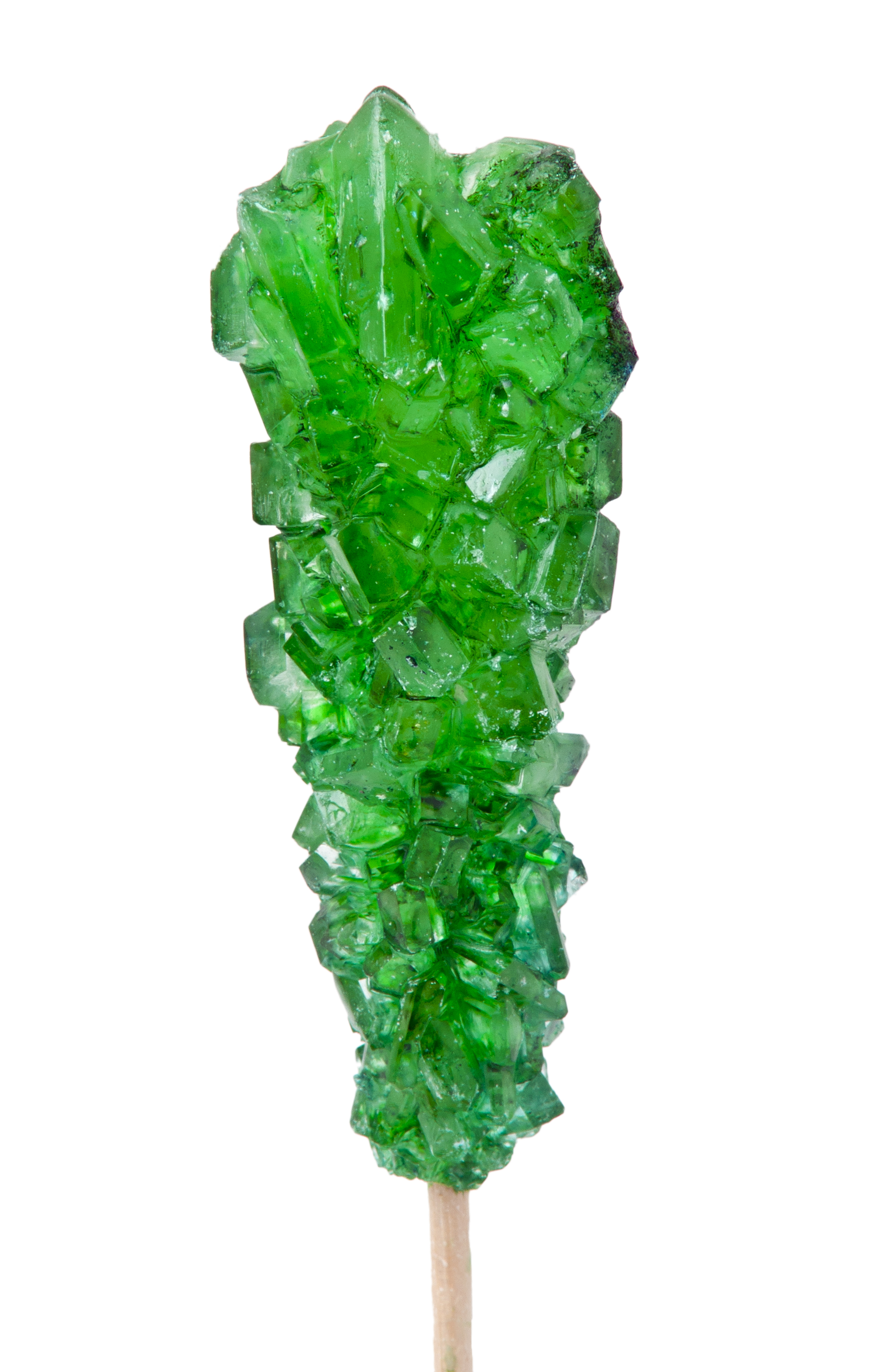
Rock candy coloured with green dye

- Coarse-grain sugar, also known as sanding sugar, composed of reflective crystals with grain size of about 1 to 3 mm, similar to kitchen salt. Used atop baked products and candies, it will not dissolve when subjected to heat and moisture.
- Granulated sugar (about 0.6 mm crystals), also known as table sugar or regular sugar, is used at the table, to sprinkle on foods and to sweeten hot drinks (coffee and tea), and in home baking to add sweetness and texture to baked products (cookies and cakes) and desserts (pudding and ice cream). It is also used as a preservative to prevent micro-organisms from growing and perishable food from spoiling, as in candied fruits, jams, and marmalades.
- Milled sugars such as powdered sugar (icing sugar) are ground to a fine powder. They are used for dusting foods and in baking and confectionery.
- Screened sugars such as caster sugar are crystalline products separated according to the size of the grains. They are used for decorative table sugars, for blending in dry mixes and in baking and confectionery.

=== Densities ===
The densities of culinary sugars varies owing to differences in particle size and inclusion of moisture:

- Beet sugar 0.80 g/mL
- Dextrose sugar 0.62 g/mL ( = 620 kg/m^3)
- Granulated sugar 0.70 g/mL
- Powdered sugar 0.56 g/mL

=== Shapes ===
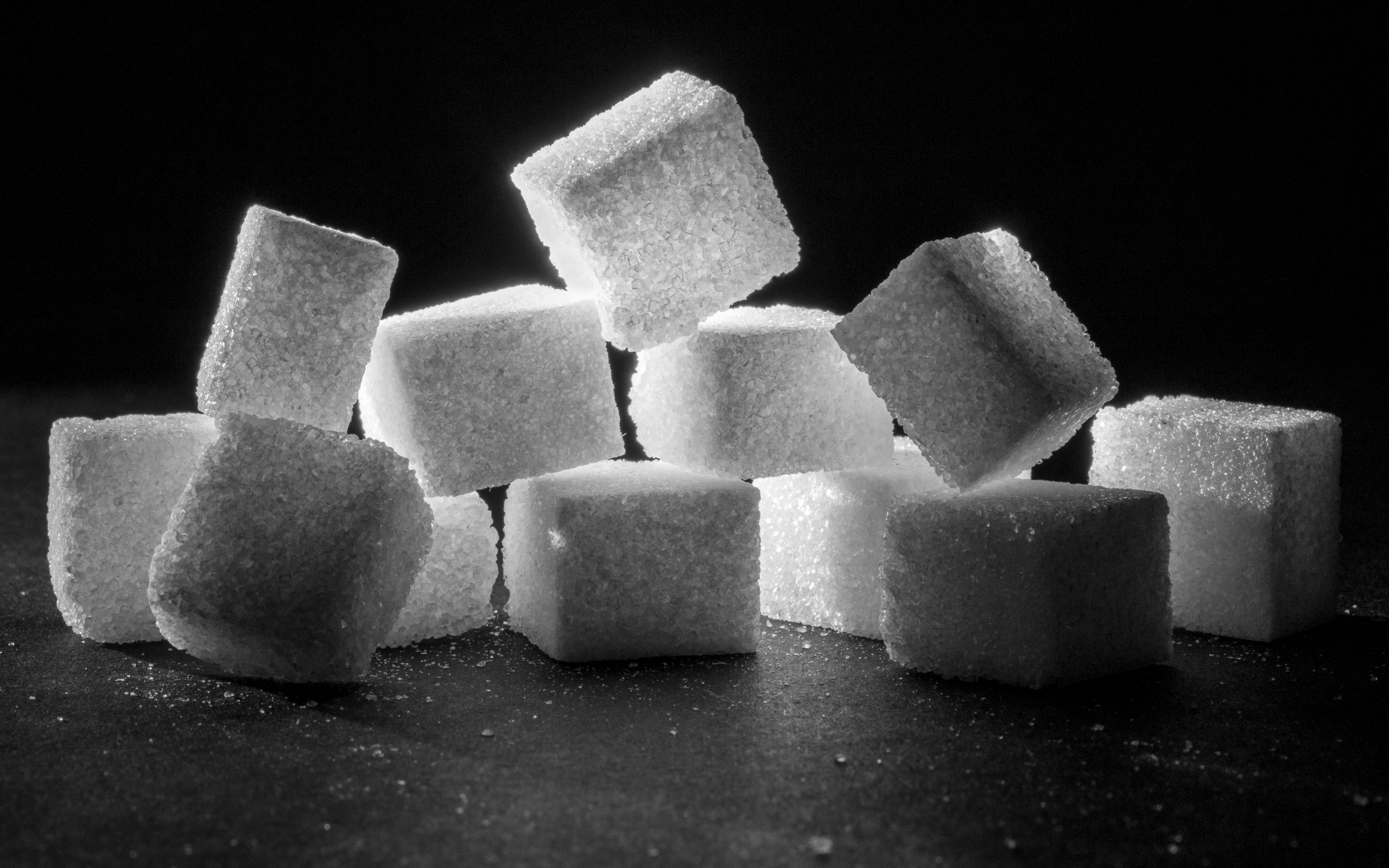
Sugar cubes

- Cube sugar (sometimes called sugar lumps) are white or brown granulated sugars lightly steamed and pressed together in block shape. They are used to sweeten drinks.
- Sugarloaf was the usual cone-form in which refined sugar was produced and sold until the late 19th century.

=== Brown sugars ===
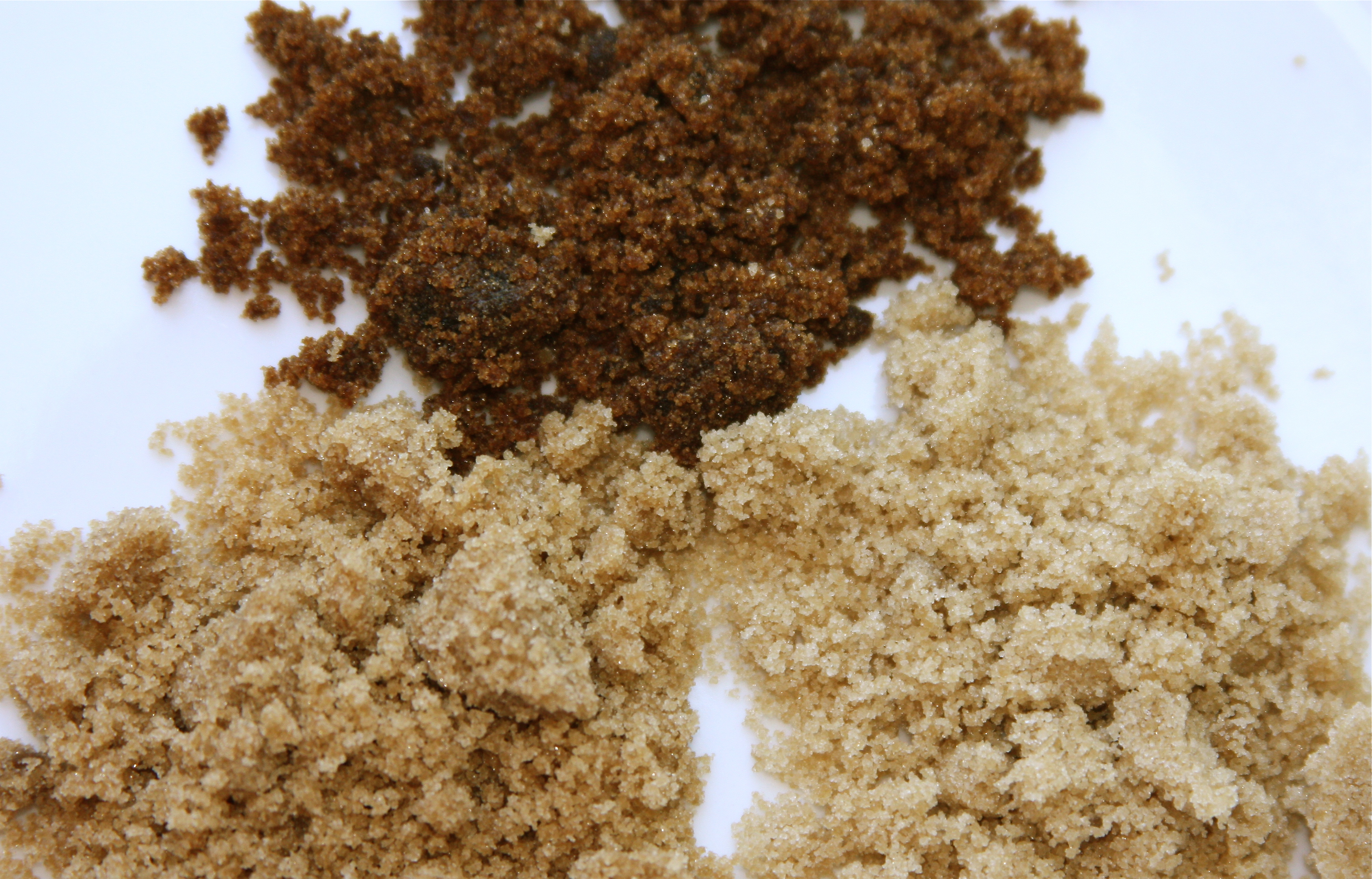
Brown sugar examples: Muscovado (top), dark brown (left), light brown (right)

Brown sugars are granulated sugars, either containing residual molasses, or with the grains deliberately coated with molasses to produce a light- or dark-coloured sugar such as muscovado and turbinado. They are used in baked goods, confectionery, and toffees. Their darkness is due to the amount of molasses they contain. They may be classified based on their darkness or country of origin.

=== Liquid sugars ===
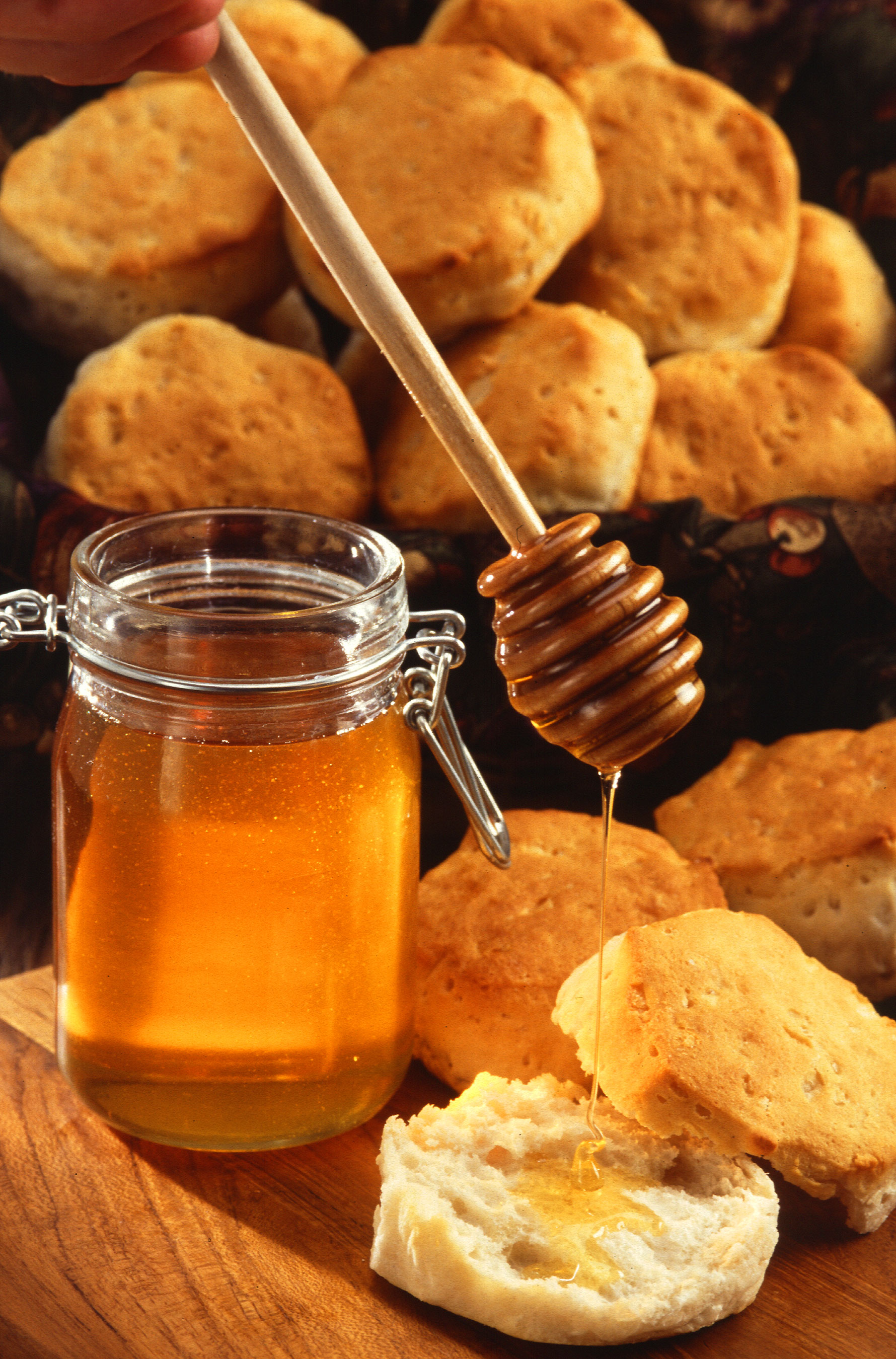
A jar of honey with a dipper and a biscuit

- Glucose syrup and corn syrup are widely used in the manufacture of foodstuffs. They are manufactured from starch by enzymatic hydrolysis. For example, corn syrup, which is produced commercially by breaking down maize starch, is one common source of purified dextrose. Such syrups are use in producing beverages, hard candy, ice cream, and jams.
- Inverted sugar syrup, commonly known as invert syrup or invert sugar, is a mixture of two simple sugars – glucose and fructose – that is made by heating granulated sugar in water. It is used in breads, cakes and beverages for adjusting sweetness, aiding moisture retention and avoiding crystallisation of sugars.
- Molasses and treacle are obtained by removing sugar from sugarcane or sugar beet juice, as a byproduct of sugar production. They may be blended with the above-mentioned syrups to enhance sweetness and used in a range of baked goods and confectionery including toffees and licorice.
- In winemaking, fruit sugars are converted into alcohol by a fermentation process. If the must formed by pressing the fruit has a low sugar content, additional sugar may be added to raise the alcohol content of the wine in a process called chaptalisation. In the production of sweet wines, fermentation may be halted before it has run its full course, leaving behind some residual sugar that gives the wine its sweet taste.

=== Burnt sugars and caramels ===
Heating sugar to near 200 °C for several minutes yields a product called burnt sugar. Often additives are used to modify the resulting caramels, e.g. alkali or sulfites. Several volatile products evolve in the heating process including butanone, several furans (2-Acetylfuran, furanone, hydroxymethyl furfural), and levoglucosan and more.

Because sugars burn easily when exposed to flame, the handling of sugar powders risks dust explosion. The 2008 Georgia Imperial sugar refinery explosion, which killed 14 people and injured 36, and destroyed most of the refinery, was caused by the ignition of sugar dust.

=== Other sweeteners ===
- Low-calorie sweeteners are often made of maltodextrin with added sweeteners. Maltodextrin is an easily digestible synthetic polysaccharide consisting of short chains of three or more glucose molecules and is made by the partial hydrolysis of starch. Strictly, maltodextrin is not classified as sugar as it contains more than two glucose molecules, although its structure is similar to maltose, a molecule composed of two joined glucose molecules.
- Polyols are sugar alcohols and are used in chewing gums where a sweet flavour is required that lasts for a prolonged time in the mouth.

== Consumption ==
Worldwide sugar provides 10% of the daily calories (based on a 2000 kcal diet). In 1750 the average Briton got 72 calories a day from sugar. In 1913 this had risen to 395. In 2015, sugar still provided around 14% of the calories in British diets. According to one source, per capita consumption of sugar in 2016 was highest in the United States, followed by Germany and the Netherlands.

=== Nutrition and flavour ===
Sugar (sucrose), brown (with molasses)
Nutritional value per 100 g (3.5 oz)
- Energy: 1,576 kJ (377 kcal)
- Carbohydrates: 97.33 g
- Sugars: 96.21 g
- Dietary fiber: 0 g
- Fat: 0 g
- Protein: 0 g
Vitamins and minerals
Vitamins	Quantity %DV^{†}
Thiamine (B1)	1% 0.008 mg
Riboflavin (B2)	1% 0.007 mg
Niacin (B3)	1% 0.082 mg
Vitamin B6	2% 0.026 mg
Folate (B9)	0% 1 μg
Minerals	Quantity %DV^{†}
Calcium	7% 85 mg
Iron	11% 1.91 mg
Magnesium	7% 29 mg
Phosphorus	2% 22 mg
Potassium	4% 133 mg
Sodium	2% 39 mg
Zinc	2% 0.18 mg
- Other constituents: Quantity
- Water: 1.77 g
- Full link to USDA database entry
- ^{†}Percentages estimated using US recommendations for adults, except for potassium, which is estimated based on expert recommendation from the National Academies.

Sugar (sucrose), granulated
Nutritional value per 100 g (3.5 oz)
- Energy: 1,619 kJ (387 kcal)
- Carbohydrates: 99.98 g
- Sugars: 99.91 g
- Dietary fiber: 0 g
- Fat: 0 g
- Protein: 0 g
Vitamins and minerals
Vitamins	Quantity %DV^{†}
Riboflavin (B2)	1% 0.019 mg
Minerals	Quantity %DV^{†}
Calcium	0% 1 mg
Iron	0% 0.01 mg
Potassium	0% 2 mg
- Other constituents: Quantity
- Water: 0.03 g
- Full link to USDA database entry
- ^{†}Percentages estimated using US recommendations for adults, except for potassium, which is estimated based on expert recommendation from the National Academies.

Brown and white granulated sugar are 97% to nearly 100% carbohydrates, respectively, with less than 2% water, and no dietary fibre, protein or fat (table). Because brown sugar contains 5–10% molasses reintroduced during processing, its value to some consumers is a richer flavour than white sugar.

== Health effects ==
The World Health Organization and other clinical associations recommend that reducing the consumption of free sugar (sugar sources added during manufacturing) to less than 10% of total energy needs can help to lower disease risk. This amount of sugar consumption is equivalent to about 50 g (1.8 oz) or 12 teaspoons of added sugar per day. As of 2025, the American Heart Association recommends that free sugar intake should be limited to 6% of total daily energy needs, or 36 g (1.3 oz) (9 teaspoons) for adult males, and 25 g (0.88 oz) (6 teaspoons) for women. In many countries, the source and amount of added sugars can be viewed among ingredients on the labels of packaged foods. Added sugars provide no nutritional benefit, but are a source of excess calories that can lead to overweight and increased disease risk.

=== Obesity and metabolic syndrome ===
A 2003 technical report by the World Health Organization provided evidence that high intake of sugary drinks (including fruit juice) increases the risk of obesity by adding to overall energy intake. By itself, sugar is not a factor causing obesity and metabolic syndrome, but rather its excessive consumption adds to caloric burden, which meta-analyses showed could increase the risk of developing type 2 diabetes and metabolic syndrome in adults and children.

=== Cancer ===
Sugar consumption does not directly cause cancer. Cancer Council Australia have stated that "there is no evidence that consuming sugar makes cancer cells grow faster or cause cancer". There is an indirect relationship between sugar consumption and obesity-related cancers through increased risk of excess body weight.

The American Institute for Cancer Research and World Cancer Research Fund recommend that people should limit sugar consumption.

=== Cognition ===
Despite some studies suggesting that sugar consumption causes hyperactivity, the quality of evidence is low and it is generally accepted within the scientific community that the notion of children's "sugar rush" is a myth. A 2019 meta-analysis found that sugar consumption does not improve mood, but can lower alertness and increase fatigue within an hour of consumption. One review of low-quality studies of children consuming high amounts of energy drinks showed association with higher rates of unhealthy behaviours, including smoking and excessive alcohol use, and with hyperactivity and insomnia, although such effects could not be specifically attributed to sugar over other components of those drinks such as caffeine.

=== Tooth decay ===
The WHO, Action on Sugar and the Scientific Advisory Committee on Nutrition (SACN) state dental caries, also known as tooth decay/cavities, "can be prevented by avoiding dietary free sugars".

A review of human studies showed that the incidence of caries is lower when sugar intake is less than 10% of total energy consumed. Sugar-sweetened beverage consumption is associated with an increased risk of tooth decay.

=== Nutritional displacement ===
The "empty calories" argument states that a diet high in added (or 'free') sugars will reduce consumption of foods that contain essential nutrients. This nutrient displacement occurs if sugar makes up more than 25% of daily energy intake, a proportion associated with poor diet quality and risk of obesity. Displacement may occur at lower levels of consumption.

=== Recommended dietary intake ===
The WHO recommends that both adults and children reduce the intake of free sugars to less than 10% of total energy intake. "Free sugars" include monosaccharides and disaccharides added to foods, and sugars found in fruit juice and concentrates, as well as in honey and syrups.

On 20 May 2016, the United States Food and Drug Administration announced changes to the Nutrition Facts panel displayed on all foods, to be effective by July 2018. New to the panel is a requirement to list "added sugars" by weight and as a percentage of Daily Value (DV). For vitamins and minerals, the intent of DVs is to indicate how much should be consumed. For added sugars, the guidance is that 100% DV should not be exceeded. 100% DV is defined as 50 grams. For a person consuming 2000 calories a day, 50 grams is equal to 200 calories and thus 10% of total calories – the same guidance as the WHO. To put this in context, most 12-US-fluid-ounce (355 ml) cans of soda contain 39 grams of sugar. In the United States, a government survey on food consumption in 2013–14 reported that, for men and women aged 20 and older, the average total sugar intakes – naturally occurring in foods and added – were, respectively, 125 and 99 grams per day. The American Heart Association recommends even lower daily consumption of added sugars: 36 grams for men and 25 grams for women.

== Society and culture ==
Manufacturers of sugary products, such as soft drinks and candy, and the Sugar Research Foundation have been accused of trying to influence consumers and medical associations in the 1960s and 1970s by creating doubt about the potential health hazards of sucrose overconsumption, while promoting saturated fat as the main dietary risk factor in cardiovascular diseases. In 2016, the criticism led to recommendations that diet policymakers emphasise the need for high-quality research that accounts for multiple biomarkers on development of cardiovascular diseases.

Originally, no sugar was white; the anthropologist Sidney Mintz writes that white likely became understood as the ideal after groups who associated the colour white with purity transferred their value to sugar. In India, sugar frequently appears in religious observances. For ritual purity, such sugar cannot be white.

== In interstellar space ==
As sugar could not have been easily formed under the extreme environment of early Earth, it has been suggested that certain sugars may have originated from space. Astronomers postulate that asteroids delivered sugars to Earth, or sugars were always present in the Solar System.

In 2000, astronomers detected glycolaldehyde—a sugar-like molecule—in interstellar space. True sugar was first collected from an asteroid in 2019. Sugar was also detected in a sample collected from the asteroid 101955 Bennu in 2020.

In 2026, erythrulose—a tetrose monosaccharide—was detected in dust grains of a molecular cloud near the center of the Milky Way, marking the first time a sugar molecule was found in interstellar space. The identification of erythrulose in galactic dust indicates its possible involvement in forming sugar-containing nucleic acids during the origin of life on Earth approximately four billion years ago.

== See also ==
- Barley sugar – Boiled sweet made from barley
- Blood sugar level – Concentration of glucose present in the blood (Glycaemia)
- Caramelization – Process of browning of sugar
- Glycemic load – Estimate of how a quantity of food will raise a blood glucose level
- Glycome – Set of all sugars, free or bound, in an organism
- Insulin – Peptide hormone
- List of unrefined sweeteners
- List of sugars

== Sources ==
This article incorporates text from a free content work. Licensed under CC BY-SA IGO 3.0 (license statement/permission). Text taken from World Food and Agriculture – Statistical Yearbook 2023, FAO, FAO.
