= Inverted sugar syrup =

Edible mixture of glucose and fructose, obtained from sucrose hydrolysis

Invert sugar
Glucose (α-d-glucopyranose form)
Fructose (β-d-fructofuranose form)

Identifiers
| CAS Number | 8013-17-0 |
| ChEMBL | ChEMBL1201647 |
| ChemSpider | none |
| PubChem CID | 21924868 |
| UNII | ED959S6ACY |

Properties
| Molar mass | 360.312 g/mol |

Pharmacology
| ATC code | C05BB03 (WHO) |
- Except where otherwise noted, data are given for materials in their standard state (at 25 °C [77 °F], 100 kPa). Infobox references

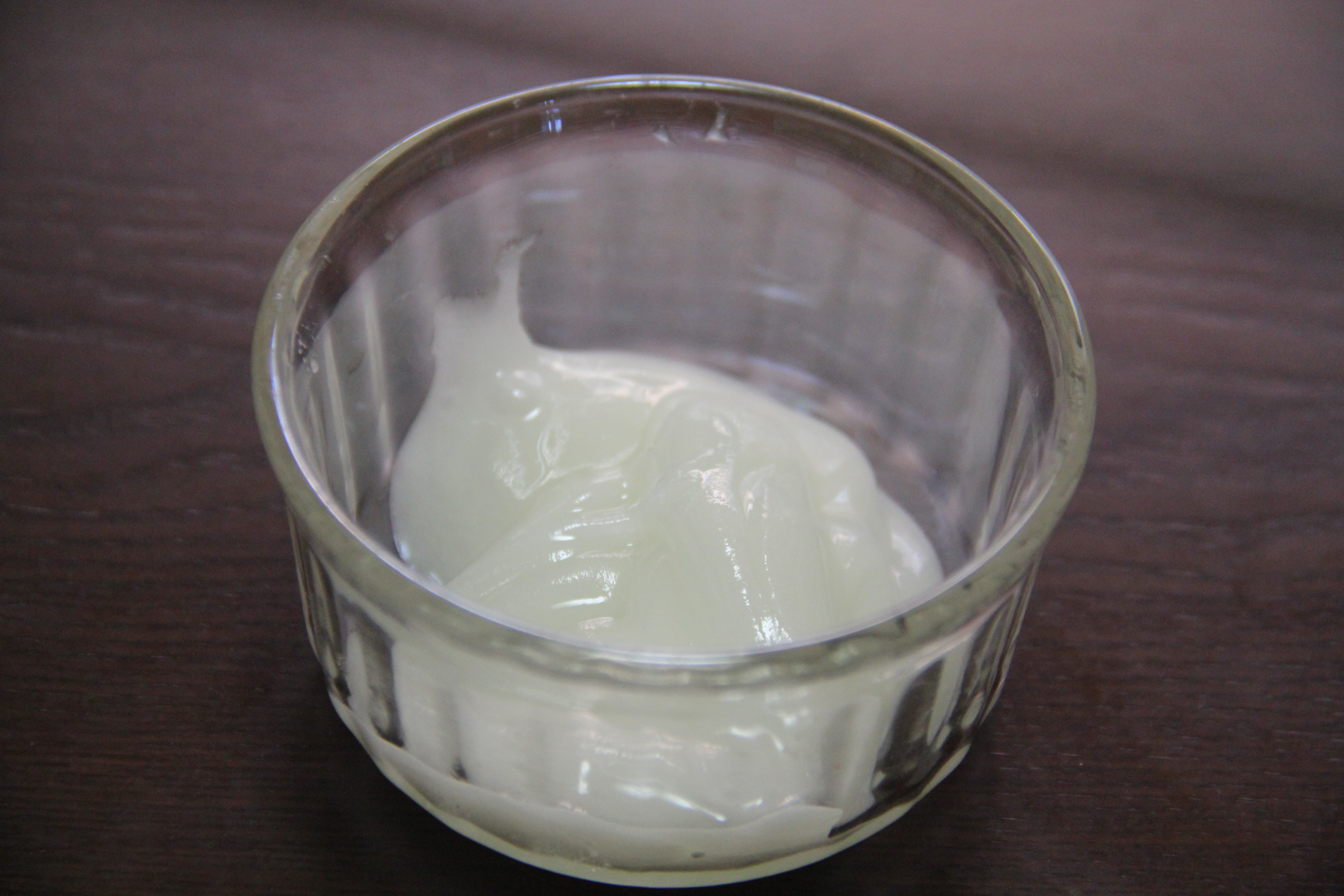
Dense inverted sugar syrup (Trimoline)

Inverted sugar syrup is a syrup mixture of the monosaccharides glucose and fructose, made by splitting the disaccharide sucrose. This mixture's optical rotation is opposite to that of the original sugar, which is why it is called an invert sugar. Splitting is completed through hydrolytic saccharification.

It is 30% sweeter than table sugar, and foods that contain invert sugar retain moisture better and crystallize less easily than those that use table sugar instead. Bakers, who call it invert syrup, may use it more than other sweeteners.

Other names include invert sugar and sucrose inversion.

== Production ==
=== Additives ===
Commercially prepared enzyme-catalyzed solutions are inverted at 60 °C (140 °F). The optimum pH for inversion is 5.0. Invertase is added at a rate of about 0.15% of the syrup's weight, and inversion time will be about 8 hours. When completed the syrup temperature is raised to inactivate the invertase, but the syrup is concentrated in a vacuum evaporator to preserve color.

Though inverted sugar syrup can be made by heating table sugar in water alone, the reaction can be sped up by adding lemon juice, cream of tartar, or other catalysts, often without changing the flavor noticeably. Common sugar can be inverted quickly by mixing sugar and citric acid or cream of tartar at a ratio of about 1000:1 by weight and adding water. If lemon juice, which is about five percent citric acid by weight, is used instead then the ratio becomes 50:1. Such a mixture, heated to 114 °C (237 °F) and added to another food, prevents crystallization without tasting sour.

Commercially prepared hydrochloric acid-catalyzed solutions may be inverted at the relatively low temperature of 50 °C (122 °F). The optimum pH for acid-catalyzed inversion is 2.15. As the inversion temperature is increased, the inversion time decreases. They are then given a pH neutralization when the desired level of inversion is reached.

In confectionery and candy making, cream of tartar is commonly used as the acidulant, with typical amounts in the range of 0.15–0.25% of the sugar's weight. The use of cream of tartar imparts a honey-like flavor to the syrup. After the inversion is completed, it may be neutralized with baking soda using a weight of 45% of the cream of tartar's weight.

=== For fermentation ===
All constituent sugars (sucrose, glucose, and fructose) support fermentation, so invert sugar solutions of any composition can be fermented.

Syrup is used to feed microbiological life, which requires oxygen found in the water. For example, kombucha is produced by fermenting inverted sugar syrup with tea using a symbiotic culture of bacteria and yeast (SCOBY), and yeast in winemaking is used for ethanol fermentation. Cold water can hold more dissolved oxygen than warm water, but granulated sugar does not dissolve easily in cold water.

Water in a container with wide bottom surface area allows for faster dissolving of the sucrose, which only has to be mixed a few times periodically to form a homogeneous solution. Also, a mixer or blender may be used to rotate the sugar, in turns, if necessary.

== In other foods and products ==
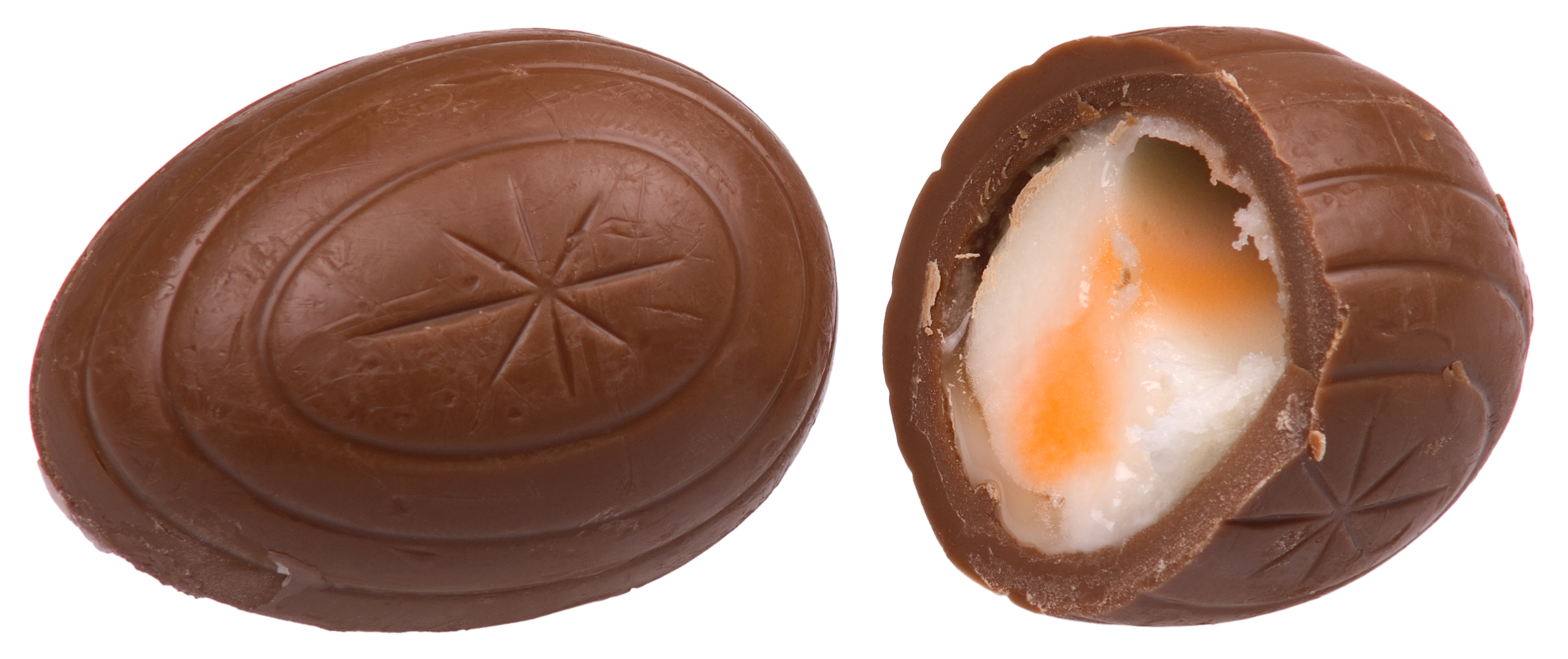
Two Cadbury Creme Eggs, one opened to show the fondant filling, which uses inverted sugar syrup as a key ingredient

- Honey is mostly a mixture of glucose and fructose similar to invert syrup and can therefore remain a liquid for longer periods of time.
- Jam contains invert sugar formed by the heating process and the acid content of the fruit. This sugar preserves the jam for long periods of time.
- Golden syrup is a syrup of about 55% invert syrup and 45% table sugar (sucrose).
- Fondant filling for chocolates is unique in that the conversion enzyme is added, but not activated by acidification (microenvironment pH adjustment) or cofactor addition depending on the enzymes, before the filling is enrobed with chocolate. The very viscous (and thus formable) filling then becomes less viscous with time, giving the creamy consistency desired. This results from the sub-optimal enzymes conditions purposely created by withholding activation factors, which allows only a fraction of the enzymes to be active, or allows all enzymes to proceed at only a fraction of the biological rate [biologically, it's realistically a combination of both: a reduced number of functional enzymes, with the ones that do function having reduced catalytic kinetics/rates].
- Cadbury Creme Eggs are filled with inverted sugar syrup produced by processing fondant with invertase.
- Sour Patch Kids also contain inverted sugar to add sweet flavor.

=== Sweetened beverages ===
Inverted sugar syrup is the basis in sweetened beverages.

- Sweet reserve is a wine term referring to a portion of selected unfermented grape must, free of microorganisms, to be added to wine as a sweetening component. When wine ferments, glucose is fermented at a faster rate than fructose. Thus, arresting fermentation after a significant portion of the sugars have fermented results in a wine where the residual sugar consists mainly of fructose, while the use of sweet reserve will result in a wine where the sweetness comes from a mixture of glucose and fructose.
- Alcoholic beverage manufacturers often add invert sugar in the production of drinks like gin, beer, and sparkling wines for flavoring. Candi sugar, similar to invert sugar, is used in the brewing of Belgian-style beers to boost alcohol content without drastically increasing the body of the beer; it is frequently found in the styles of beer known as dubbel and tripel.

== Chemistry ==
Table sugar (sucrose) is converted to invert sugar by hydrolysis. Heating a mixture or solution of table sugar and water breaks the chemical bond that links together the two simple-sugar components.

The balanced chemical equation for the hydrolysis of sucrose into glucose and fructose is:

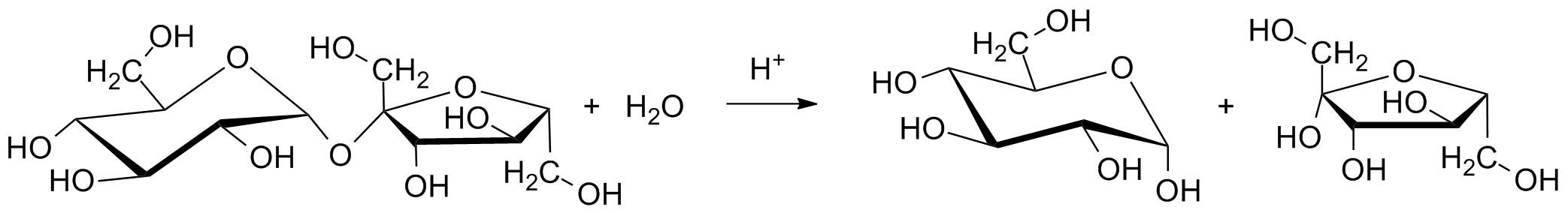

C_{12}H_{22}O_{11} (sucrose) + H_{2}O (water) → C_{6}H_{12}O_{6} (glucose) + C_{6}H_{12}O_{6} (fructose)

=== Optical rotation ===
After a sucrose solution has had some of its sucrose turned into glucose and fructose the solution is no longer said to be pure. The gradual decrease in purity of a sucrose solution as it is hydrolyzed affects a chemical property of the solution called optical rotation that can be used to figure out how much of the sucrose has been hydrolyzed and therefore whether the solution has been inverted or not.

==== Definition and measurement ====
Plane-polarized light can be shone through a sucrose solution as it is heated up for hydrolysis. Such light has an 'angle' that can be measured using a tool called a polarimeter. When such light is shone through a solution of pure sucrose it comes out the other side with a different angle than when it entered, which is proportional to both the concentration of the sugar and the length of the path of light through the solution; its angle is therefore said to be 'rotated' and how many degrees the angle has changed (the degree of its rotation or its 'optical rotation') is given a letter name, $\alpha$ (alpha). When the rotation between the angle the light has when it enters and when it exits is in the clockwise direction, the light is said to be 'rotated right' and $\alpha$ is given to have a positive angle such as 64°. When the rotation between the angle the light has when it enters and when it exits is in the counterclockwise direction, the light is said to be 'rotated left' and $\alpha$ is given a negative angle such as −39°.

==== Definition of the inversion point ====
When plane-polarized light passes through a solution of pure sucrose, its angle is rotated clockwise. As the sucrose is heated and hydrolyzed, the amount of glucose and fructose in the mixture increases, causing the optical rotation to decrease. After $\alpha$ passes zero and becomes a negative optical rotation, meaning that the rotation between the angle the light has when it enters and when it exits is in the counter clockwise direction, it is said that the optical rotation has 'inverted' its direction. This leads to the definition of an 'inversion point' as the percentage of sucrose that has to be hydrolyzed before $\alpha$ equals zero. Any solution which has passed the inversion point (and therefore has a negative value of $\alpha$) is said to be 'inverted'.

==== Chirality and specific rotation ====
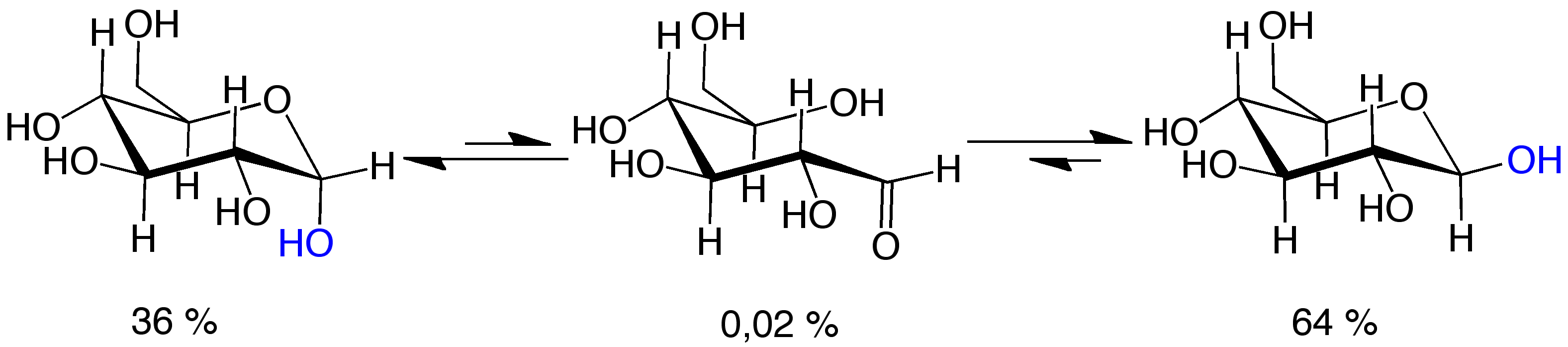
Mutarotation: The α-anomer of glucose (left) interconverts into its β-anomer (right)

Glucose and fructose are chiral molecules, meaning they can't be rotated to superimpose with their mirror image (like how a right hand cannot be rotated to become a left hand). Because they are chiral, the plane of linearly polarized light is rotated as it passes through solutions of glucose and fructose. The cyclic forms of glucose and fructose have two major anomeric forms which rotate light differently: the α-anomer and the β-anomer (see image).

The anomers of glucose and fructose rapidly interconvert into one another until they reach an equilibrium mixture. At room temperature, the equilibrium mixture for glucose corresponds to roughly one third of the glucose molecules being the α-anomer, and two thirds the β-anomer.

Because the anomers rotate light differently, the overall rotation of light as it passes through a solution of glucose or fructose is the average of the rotation from all of the anomers. This average is called the sugar’s specific rotation, denoted $[\alpha]$, and is a characteristic physical property measured under defined conditions.

At 20 °C, the specific optical rotation of sucrose is 66.6°, glucose is 52.2°, and fructose is −92.4°.

==== Effects of water ====
Water molecules do not have chirality, therefore they do not have any effect on the measurement of optical rotation. When plane-polarized light enters a body of pure water its angle is no different from when it exits. Thus, for water, $[\alpha]$ = 0°. Chemicals that, like water, have specific rotations that equal zero degrees are called 'optically inactive' chemicals and like water, they do not need to be considered when calculating optical rotation, outside of the concentration and path length.

==== Mixtures in general ====
The overall optical rotation of a mixture of chemicals can be calculated if the proportion of the amount of each chemical in the solution is known. If there are $N$-many optically active different chemicals ('chemical species') in a solution and the molar concentration (the number of moles of each chemical per liter of liquid solution) of each chemical in the solution is known and written as $C_i$ (where $i$ is a number used to identify the chemical species); and if each species has a specific rotation (the optical rotation of that chemical were it made as a pure solution) written as $[\alpha]_i$, then the mixture has the overall optical rotation
$$\displaystyle \alpha = \frac{\sum_{i=1}^N C_i [\alpha]_i}{\sum_{i=1}^N C_i} = \sum_{i=1}^N \left(\frac{C_i}{\sum_{i=1}^N C_i}\right)[\alpha]_i = \sum_{i=1}^N \chi_i[\alpha]_i$$
Where $\chi_i$ is the mole fraction of the $i \mathrm{^{th}}$ species.

==== Fully hydrolyzed sucrose ====
Assuming no extra chemical products are formed by accident (that is, there are no side reactions) a completely hydrolyzed sucrose solution no longer has any sucrose and is a half-and-half mixture of glucose and fructose. This solution has the optical rotation
$$\displaystyle \alpha = \frac{1}{2}[\alpha]_{\text{glucose}} + \frac{1}{2}[\alpha]_{\text{fructose}} = \frac{1}{2}(52.7^\circ - 92.0^\circ) = -19.7^\circ$$

==== Partly hydrolyzed sucrose ====
If a sucrose solution has been partly hydrolyzed, then it contains sucrose, glucose, and fructose and its optical rotation angle depends on the relative amounts of each for the solution;
$$\displaystyle \alpha = \chi_s[\alpha]_s +\chi_g[\alpha]_g +\chi_f[\alpha]_f$$
Where $s$, $g$, and $f$ stand for sucrose, glucose, and fructose.

The particular values of $\chi$ do not need to be known to make use of this equation as the inversion point (per cent amount of sucrose that must be hydrolyzed before the solution is inverted) can be calculated from the specific rotation angles of the pure sugars. The reaction stoichiometry (the fact that hydrolyzing one sucrose molecule makes one glucose molecule and one fructose molecule) shows that when a solution begins with $x_0$ moles of sucrose and no glucose nor fructose and $x$ moles of sucrose are then hydrolyzed the resulting solution has $x_0-x$ moles of sucrose, $x$ moles of glucose and $x$ moles of fructose. The total number of moles of sugars in the solution is therefore $x+x_0$and the reaction progress (per cent completion of the hydrolysis reaction) equals $\frac{x}{x_0} \times 100 \%$. It can be shown that the solution's optical rotation angle is a function of (explicitly depends on) this per cent reaction progress. When the quantity $\frac{x}{x_0}$ is written as $r$ and the reaction is $r \times 100\%$ done, the optical rotation angle is
$$\displaystyle \alpha_{r} = \frac{(x_0-x)[\alpha]_s +x[\alpha]_g +x[\alpha]_f}{x_0 + x} = \frac{1}{1 + r}\left([\alpha]_s +  ([\alpha]_g + [\alpha]_f - [\alpha]_s) r\right)$$

By definition, $\alpha$ equals zero degrees at the 'inversion point'; to find the inversion point, therefore, alpha is set equal to zero and the equation is manipulated to find $r$. This gives
$$\displaystyle r_{\text{inversion}} = \frac{[\alpha]_s}{[\alpha]_s - [\alpha]_g - [\alpha]_f} = 0.629$$
Thus it is found that a sucrose solution is inverted once at least $62.9 \%$ of the sucrose has been hydrolyzed into glucose and fructose.

==== Monitoring reaction progress ====
Holding a sucrose solution at temperatures of 50–60 °C (122–140 °F) hydrolyzes no more than about 85% of its sucrose. Finding $\alpha$ when r = 0.85 shows that the optical rotation of the solution after hydrolysis is done is −12.7° this reaction is said to invert the sugar because its final optical rotation is less than zero. A polarimeter can be used to figure out when the inversion is done by detecting whether the optical rotation of the solution at an earlier time in its hydrolysis reaction equals −12.7°.

== See also ==
- High-fructose corn syrup
- List of syrups
