= Sugar refinery =

Factory which processes raw sugar into white sugar

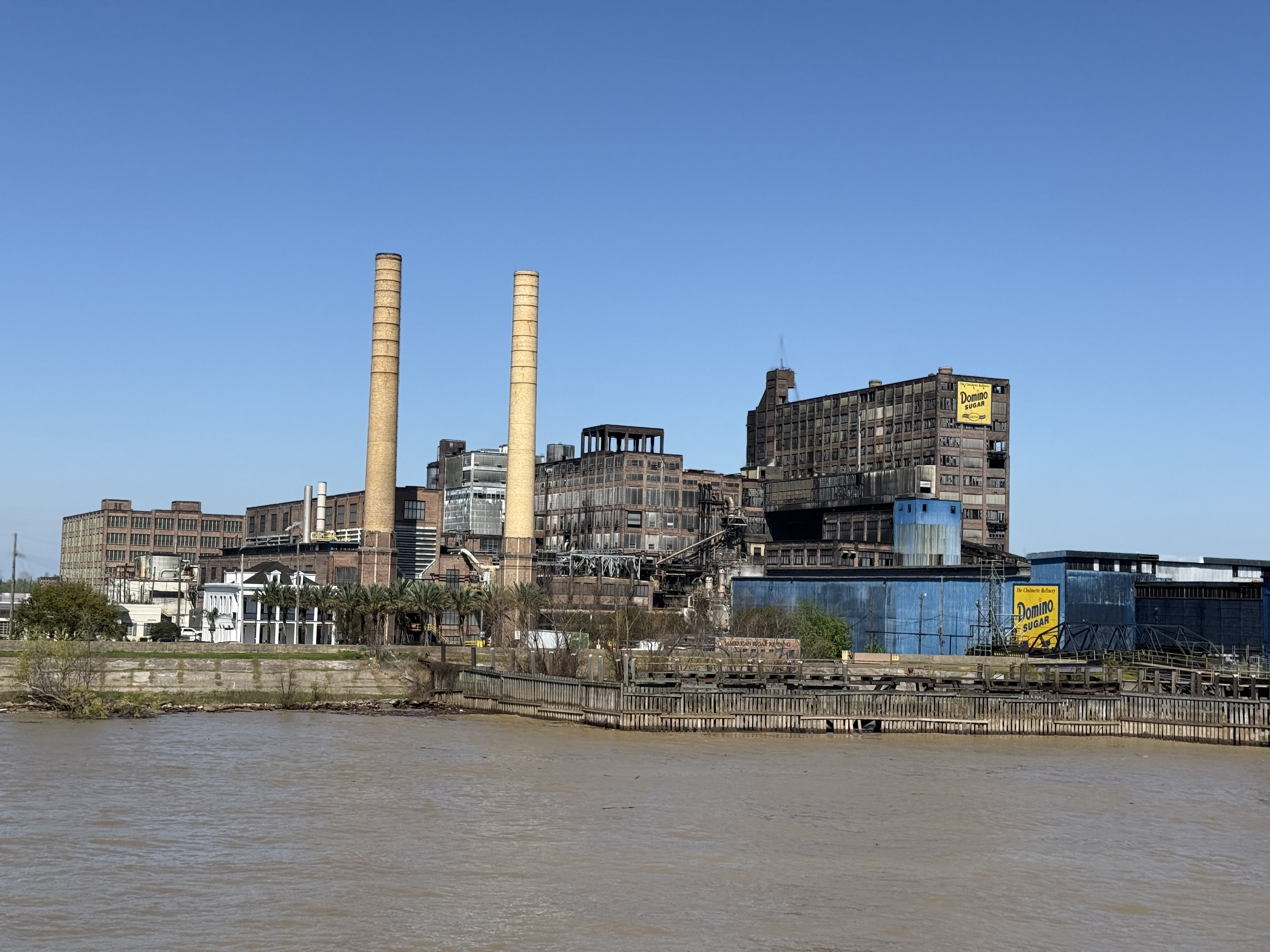
The Domino sugar refinery in Arabi, Louisiana, USA

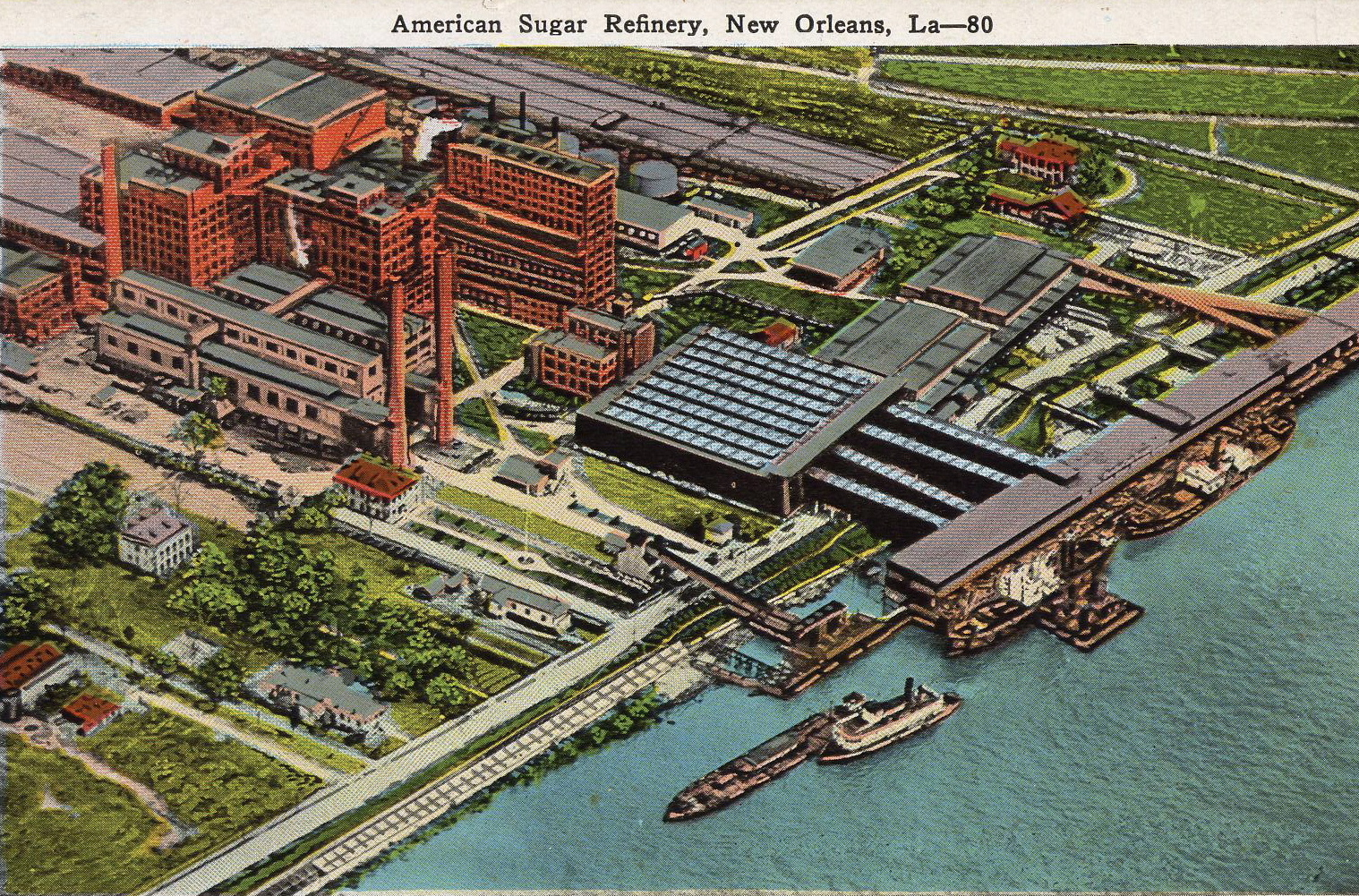
The same from above.

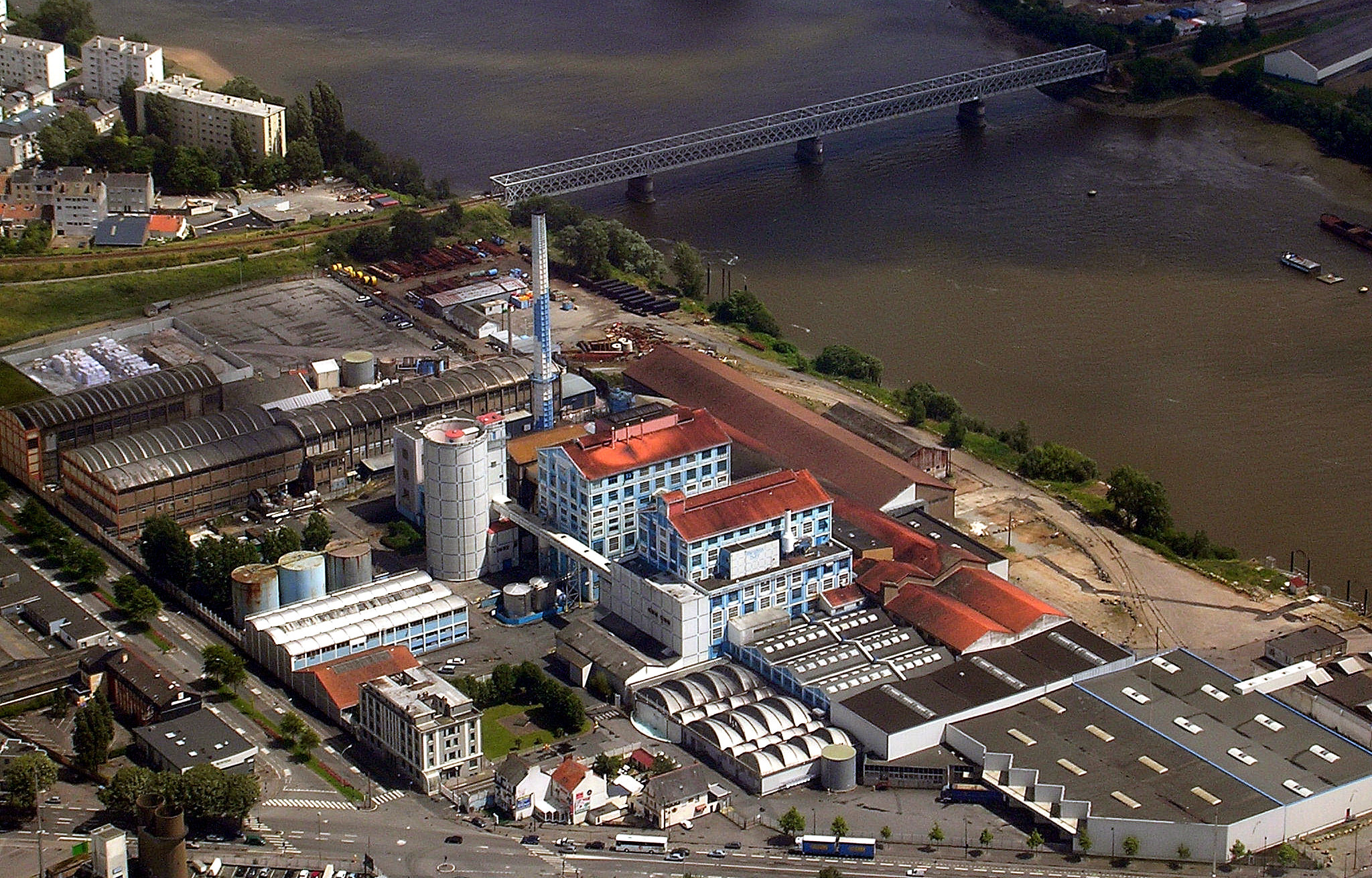
Sugar refinery in Nantes, Atlantic coast of France

A sugar refinery is a refinery which processes raw sugar from cane or sugar extracted from beets into white refined sugar.

Cane sugar mills traditionally produce raw sugar, which is sugar that still contains molasses, giving it more coloration (and impurities) than the white sugar which is normally consumed in households and used as an ingredient in soft drinks and foods. Raw cane sugar does not need refining to be palatable. It is refined for reasons such as health, color, and the requirement for a pure sugar taste. Raw sugar is stable for transport and can be taken from mills to locations for processing into white sugar. Cane sugar mills / factories often produce a partially refined product called Plantation (or Mill) White for their local market, but this is inferior to white sugar made by refineries.

Beet sugar factories can also produce raw sugar, but this has an unpleasant taste. There is no separate raw sugar stage to the process; the sugar extract from the beet is, after cleaning, crystallized directly into white sugar.The equivalent of molasses is regarded as unfit for humans, and accordingly used in sundry industrial processes, fed to livestock etc.

== History ==
=== Overview ===
The origins of the art of refining sugar seem to stem from Khorasan in Persia. Next, the Venetians produced refined sugar, resembling sugar candy. In 1573, the first German sugar refinery was built in Augsburg. During the 17th century, the Dutch started their refineries, which soon dominated the European market. The risks involved in large refineries stimulated developments in the insurance industry.

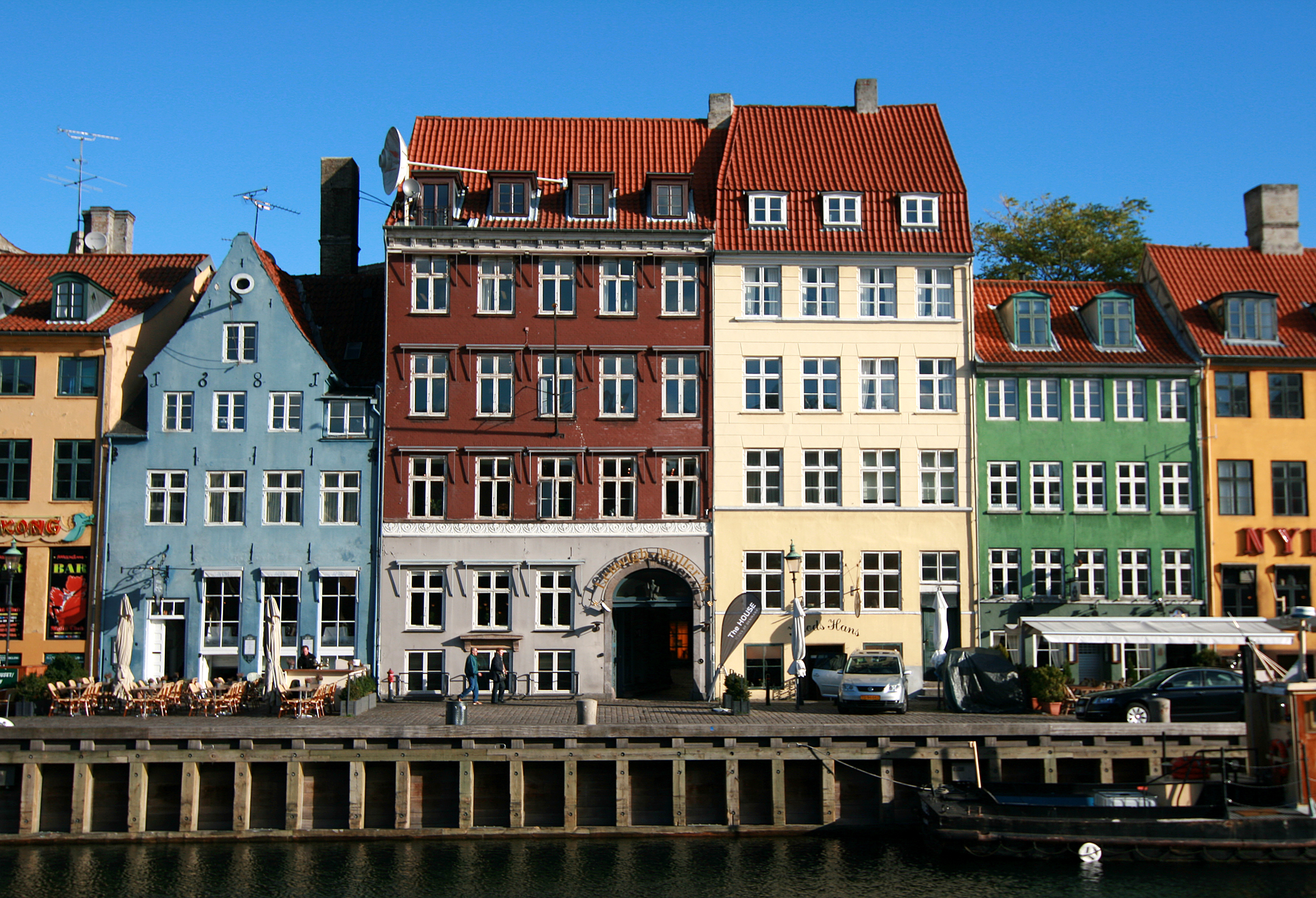
Nyhavn 11 in Copenhagen was a traditional sugar refinery

In the early modern era (AD 1500 to 1800) the sugar refinery process consisted of some standard steps. First the raw sugar was put in a copper boiler and mixed with bullock's blood and lime-water. The mixture was then left to stand for a night in order to dissolve. In the morning, a fire was lit under the pan or boiler. The albumen of the blood then coagulated and entangled the mechanical impurities of the sugar, forming a scum that was constantly removed. The simmering was then continued till a sample of the mixture appeared transparent. It was then rapidly boiled down till such consistency that it could form threads between one's finger and thumb. At which point the fire was damped. The second step was granulation. For this, the syrup was transferred to a vessel called a cooler, where it was agitated with wooden oars till it granulated. The third step was to put the granulated sugar in molds.

The first sugar refineries were located in coastal cities throughout western Europe. They did not necessarily have to be in a port city, because at the time goods were generally transloaded from a ship onto a barge before reaching their destination. Sugar refineries are often located in heavy sugar-consuming regions such as North America, Europe, and Japan. Since the 1990s, many state-of-the art sugar refineries have been built in the Middle East and North Africa region, e.g. in Dubai, Saudi Arabia and Algeria. The world's largest sugar refinery company is American Sugar Refining with facilities in North America and Europe.

=== Sugar refineries as a type of building ===
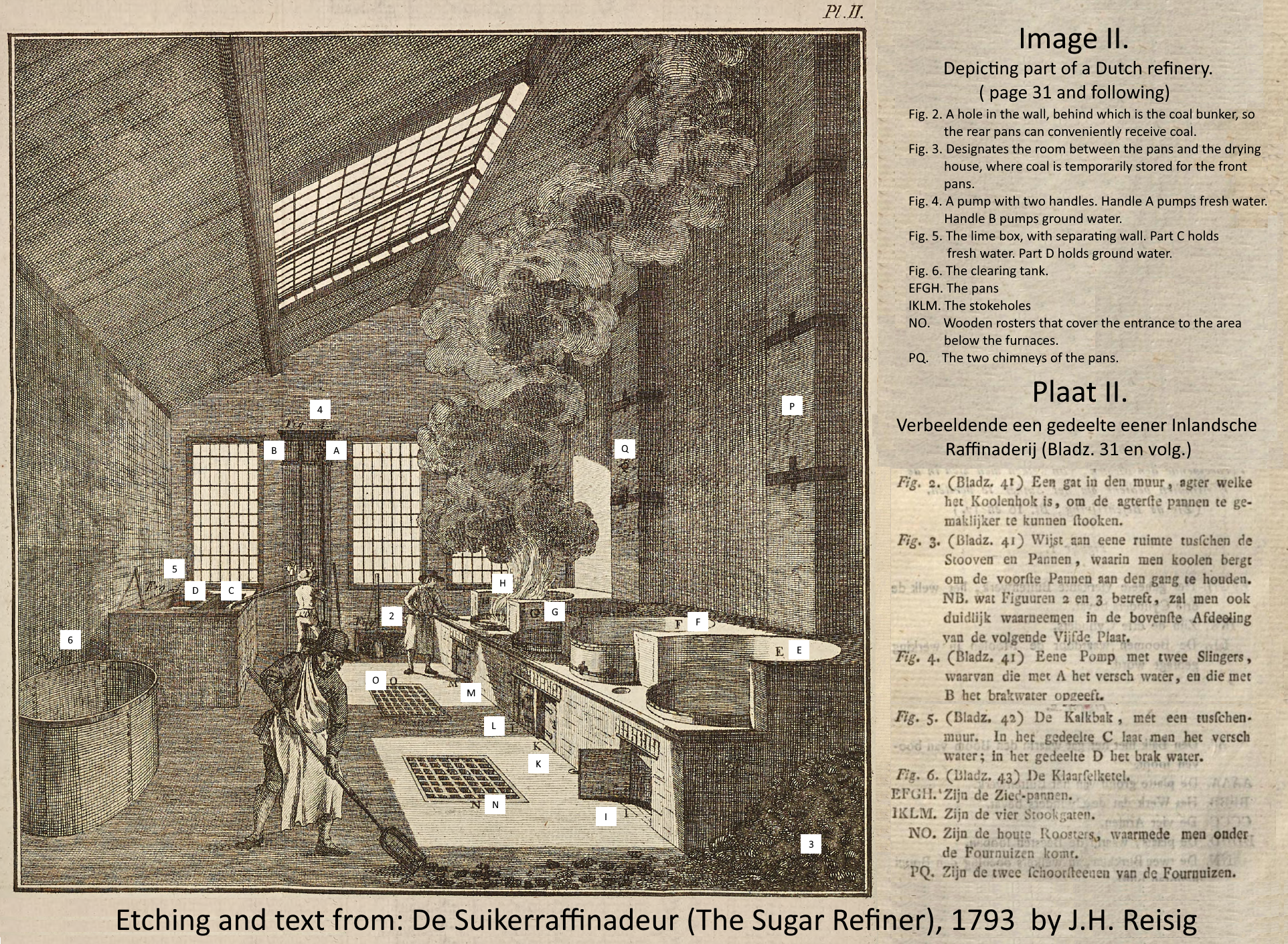
Description of an ideal sugar refinery in 1793

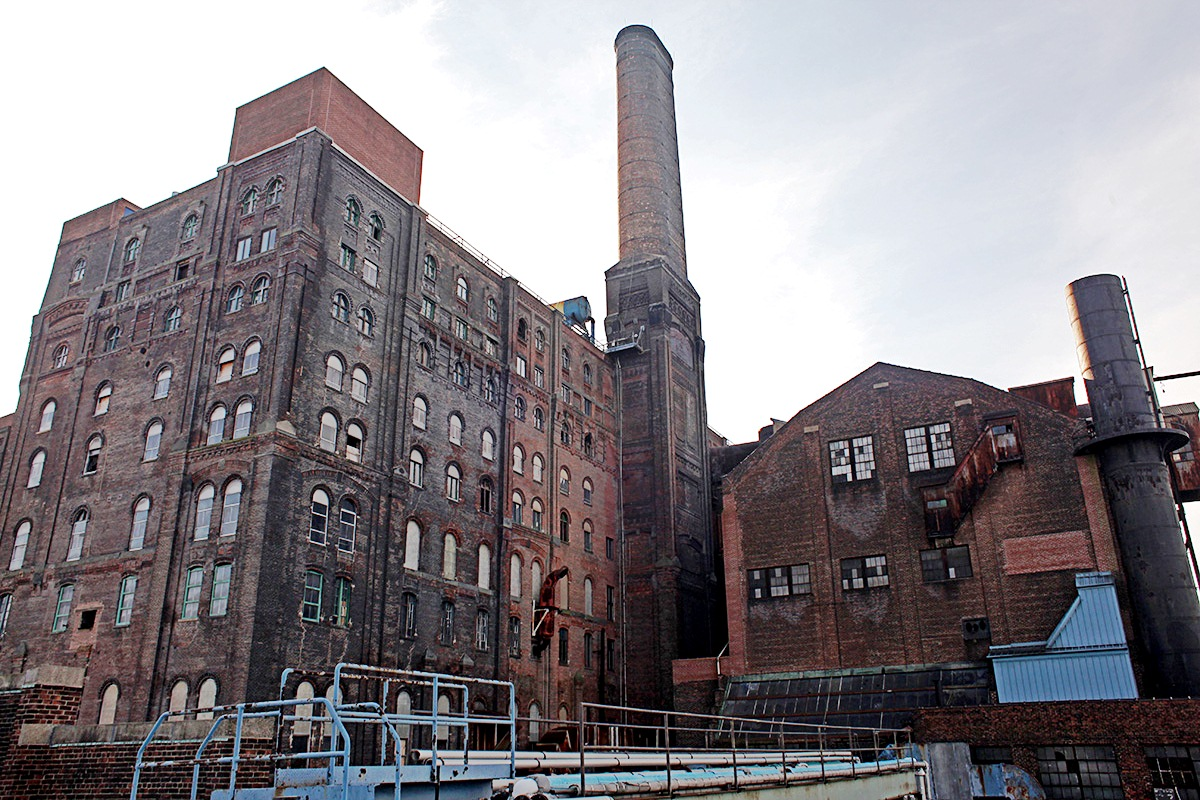
The 1880s Domino Sugar Refinery in New York

The sugar refineries that were built from about 1500 AD to 1800 did not require purpose built buildings. Ideally, they were located on a broad street along a broad canal with a good quay, so resources could be brought in at low cost by barge and by road. The refinery also had to stand somewhat free from other buildings. It required wind to dry the produce and to keep it from sweating, especially in Summer. The chimneys also had to significantly stick out above the surrounding buildings. From about 1800 the Industrial Revolution changed the refining process by introducing steam power and all kinds of machinery. It led to the construction of specialized building that could be recognized by having a large number of very shallow floors.

The pre-1800 refinery was extensively described in the Netherlands, because the Dutch Republic dominated the trade in and refining of sugar for a long time. In Holland, the ideal refinery was at least 150 Rijnland feet (0.3140 m) long and 30 feet wide. The warehouse of the refinery would be on the street/canal side. It had to be at least 30 feet wide, 40 feet long and 20 feet high, with enough natural light and two 10 feet doors to let pass 2000-3000 pound barrels. The warehouse needed a windlass for vertical transport and a scale to weigh at least 1,800 pounds. Ideally, the warehouse and the refinery were separate buildings, but with the high real estate prices in Holland, this was rare.

The refinery was often directly behind the warehouse in the same building. Closest to the warehouse was the storage for raw materials. Here, there were 4 rooms/boxes to store different kinds of raw sugar, which was fed into the boxes from the first floor. These were each 6 feet long and 12–14 feet wide, making that the raw sugar storage part of the refinery was about 30 feet long, and as wide as the total building, i.e. at least 30 feet. In the 16–18 feet of width that was left there were all kinds of tools, and things like baskets to move the scum. Near the first box, there was a hole in the ceiling and all the floors above, in order to transport goods vertically by rope. On the first floor, there was a storage for lime, which was the same size as the pans, so enough lime could be stored to operate the refinery for 3–4 months.

Behind the storage for raw materials was the drying house, also called drying stove or oven. One or two houses were for drying the sugar loaves, two more were for making candy. These drying rooms were 10 feet long, 12 feet wide and 30 feet high. Each contained an iron stove burning on coal. It was set in brick, and fed from outside the room.

The part of the refinery where the actual refining took place was behind the drying house. Here were the copper boilers called pans (ziedpannen) where the sugar was boiled. Most of the Dutch refineries had four pans, many had three, and only a few had two. If there were four, these pans occupied a length of at least 25 feet. Each pan rested on a brick vault under which was its own stove. The location of these pans was in the rear of the refinery in order to have as much light as possible, and as little draft as possible. The light came from the rear façade of the building, which ended on an open space of about 25 feet long. Here earth and coal were stored. Below the refinery was a lead tube that allowed to pump fresh water that, in Amsterdam, was brought by barge schuitwater to the rear of the building. The same part of the building that contained the pans also contained the two lime cisterns. These had to be founded at least 30 feet deep and stood 4 feet above ground level. They were 9 by 6 feet and stood opposite the pans. Behind the lime boxes were the scum boxes of 8–9 feet high. Opposite the first pans (counted from the street) was the cleared juice cistern klaarselketel. It was about 4 feet above ground and could contain about 8-9000 pounds of cleared sugar.

The post 1800 industrial sugar refinery was characterized by using gravity to transport sugar downwards through the building as it went through several refining steps. In combination with some other features, this led a recognizable type of 19th century sugar refinery building. Examples were buildings of: the Domino Sugar Refinery, the Boston Sugar Refinery, the Amsterdamsche Stoom Suikerraffinaderij, the Wester Suikerraffinaderij and the Nederlandsche Suikerraffinaderij.

=== History of the refining process ===
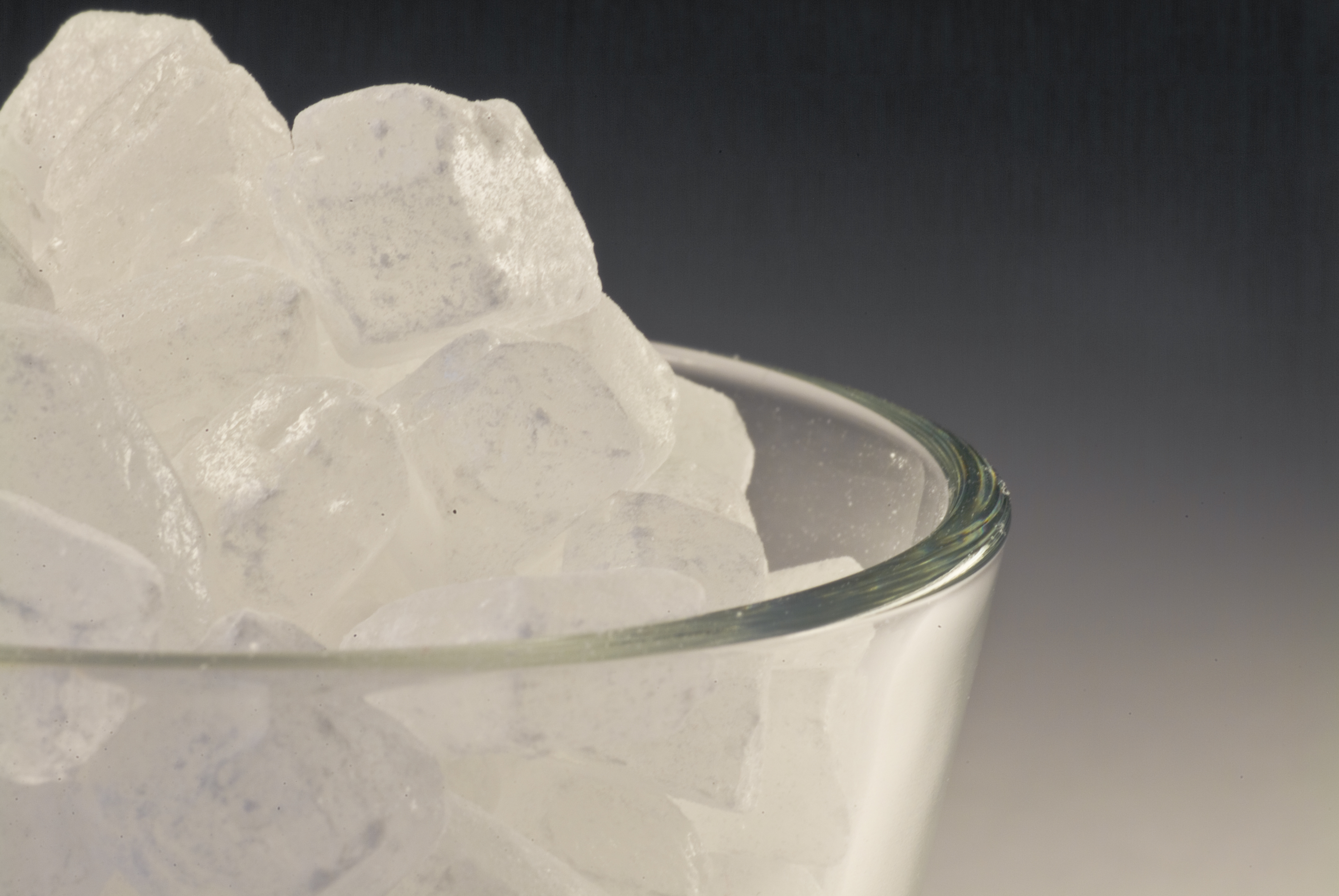
Sugar candy

The refining process was also extensively described in 1793. In 1833 another description referred to it as 'The old, or German Method, by Blood, Eggs, Clay etc. At the time refineries produced different kinds of sugar. Loaf sugar was the highest quality. Next came lump sugar, followed by bastard sugar. Bastard sugar was made from the drainings of loaf and lump sugar. It was generally ground and sold as powder sugar. Sugar candy consisted of very large crystals formed around threads. It was either white or brown, depending on the quality of the sugar that was used.

The first step, roughly equal to purification, was to fill the pans with fresh water and some lime water. Next raw sugar was put into the pan. The pans had a brace, which was a part of the front of the pan which occupied between 33 and 40% of its circumference, and was about two feet high. After the lower part of the pan had been filled, the brace was fixed in place to allow further filling. The mixture would then be left to stand during the night to dissolve the sugar. On the morrow, the fire below the pan was lit, and the mixture was slowly heated. It was regularly stirred to prevent the sugar from attaching to the pan. Stirring was decreased when the sugar had completely dissolved. When the sugar had almost reached the boiling point, the fire was almost extinguished. During heating the lime bound to impurities and formed a solidified scum, which was removed with a skimmer, resembling a perforated spade, with a 6–8 feet long handle. As soon as this was done a solution of eggs in water was plunged into the sugar mixture. This was done for the egg white or albumen, which bound more impurities. This led to more scum being scraped off. This was repeated 5-6 times, till a white slimy layer appeared on the surface instead of more scum. The solution was then called klaarsel for being cleared. Here clear also meant transparent. For purifying very rough sugar, ground water was used, and more lime and more eggs. The total use of eggs could be 400 or 500 a day, costing up four guilders for 100 in the winter. Adding fresh blood of oxen could help to further clarify sugar, but it was often used when not fresh, and as an alternative to expensive eggs. This led to rotten sugar, and in Holland it led to an official, but ineffective ban of its use.

The second step was to filter and store the cleared liquor. For that it was brought to the cleared juice cistern by feeding it into a copper tube (or trough) that ended above a filter that was placed over the cistern. This filter was a piece of cloth in a basket and caught things like egg scales, nails, pieces of wood etc. At the time, the cleared juice cistern, was simply called cistern. It also served to hold the cleared juice while the first two pans were cleaned.

The third step was equal to evaporation. Small portions of the clarified juice were fed to the first pan, which was brought to boil by a brisk fire. In about 12–30 minutes, evaporation would lead the liquor to attain its requisite degree of viscosity. In Holland fast evaporation was obvious only for sugar candy. The test whether the liquor could form threads between one's finger and thumb determined when the sugar was 'done'. The first option to continue refining was to drain off the remaining water by using gravity, which would result in loaf, lump or bastard sugar. The other option was to evaporate the remaining water by heat, resulting in Sugar candy.

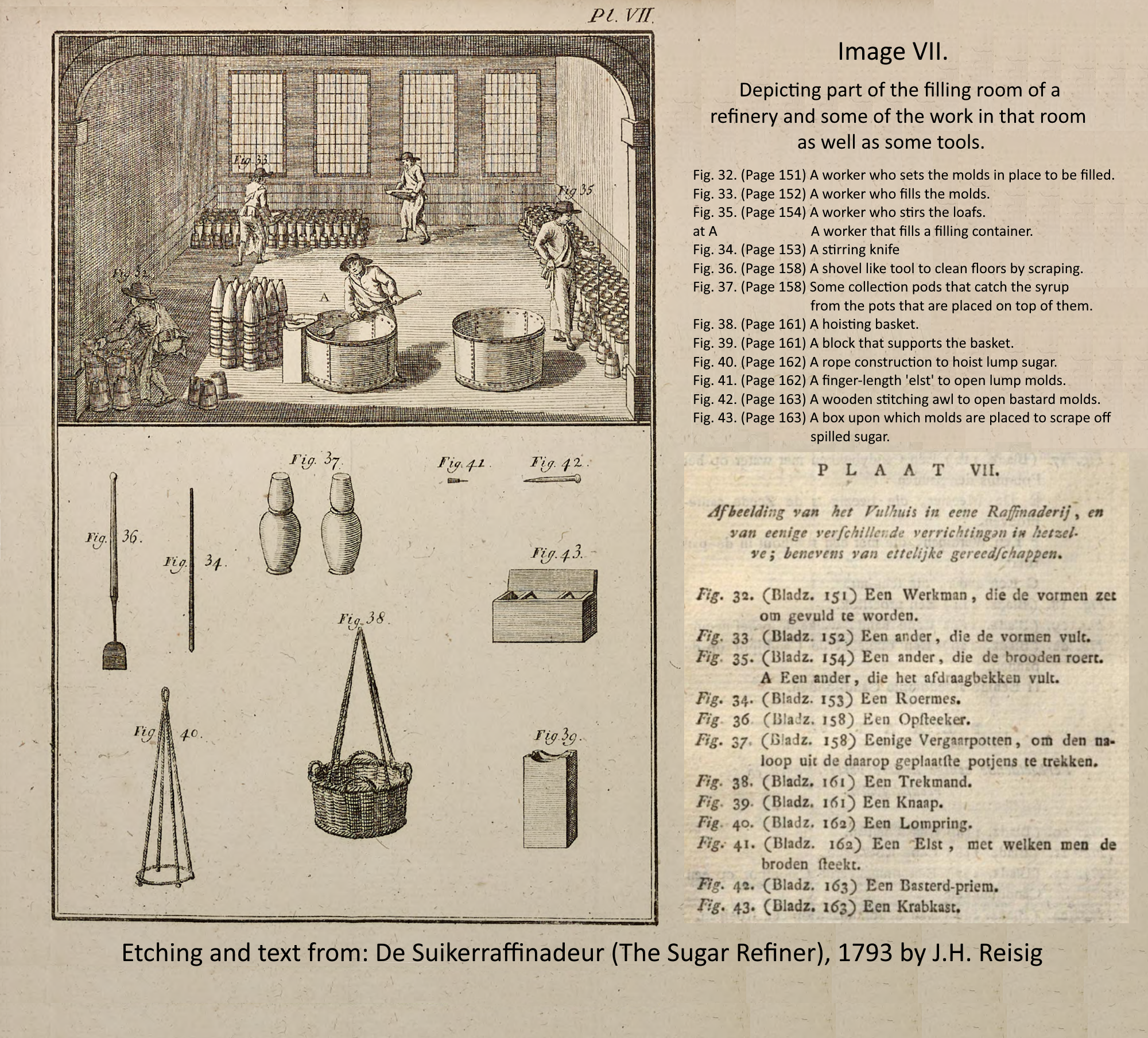
Filling molds in 1793

The fourth step cooling, was not applicable to sugar candy. For loaf sugar the third or fourth pan were used as cooling pans. For lump sugar three pans were used for cooling. As soon as a pan of sugar was 'done' (i.e. boiled), it was transferred to a cooling pan. when it had sufficiently cooled, the sugar would form a crust. Ideally, the next batch of boiled sugar was done at this exact moment and was then added to the cooling pan. A cooling pan could be filled with up to five batches. Also see granulation above.

Filling the molds was the fifth step. Sugar candy was made by drying the sugar by heat. For this it was brought to the drying house by transport bucket. Here the sugar was put in candy pots. The operation to put the sugar in the transport buckets and to fill the pots could take about two-three minutes. Ideally, the second pan was by then ready to fill the transport buckets. If candy sugar was made, the drying room could contain about 150 pots of candy made from the raw sugar of four pans after about 6 hours of work. The drying room was then cleaned, shut off, and the fire in its stove was lit.

If sugar loaves or lump sugar was made, the sugar was brought to the filling room, see image: Filling molds in 1793. Here, the molds were filled. These had a conical shape with a hole in the tip, which was stopped by a piece of cloth. In the filling room, the molds were filled and then placed on their pointy end, starting in a corner of the room. They were then stacked up to each other while the outer rows were supported by prefixes voorzetsels, i.e. broken molds that were not fit for any other purpose.

The day after, the molds were brought to one of the upper floors. Here the stop of the forms was removed, and over a few days syrup leaked out and was gathered into collection pots. The forms were then put on top of a box, where sugar that stuck to the outside of the form was scraped off and collected. The loaves were carefully ticked out of the molds.

=== In the United Kingdom ===
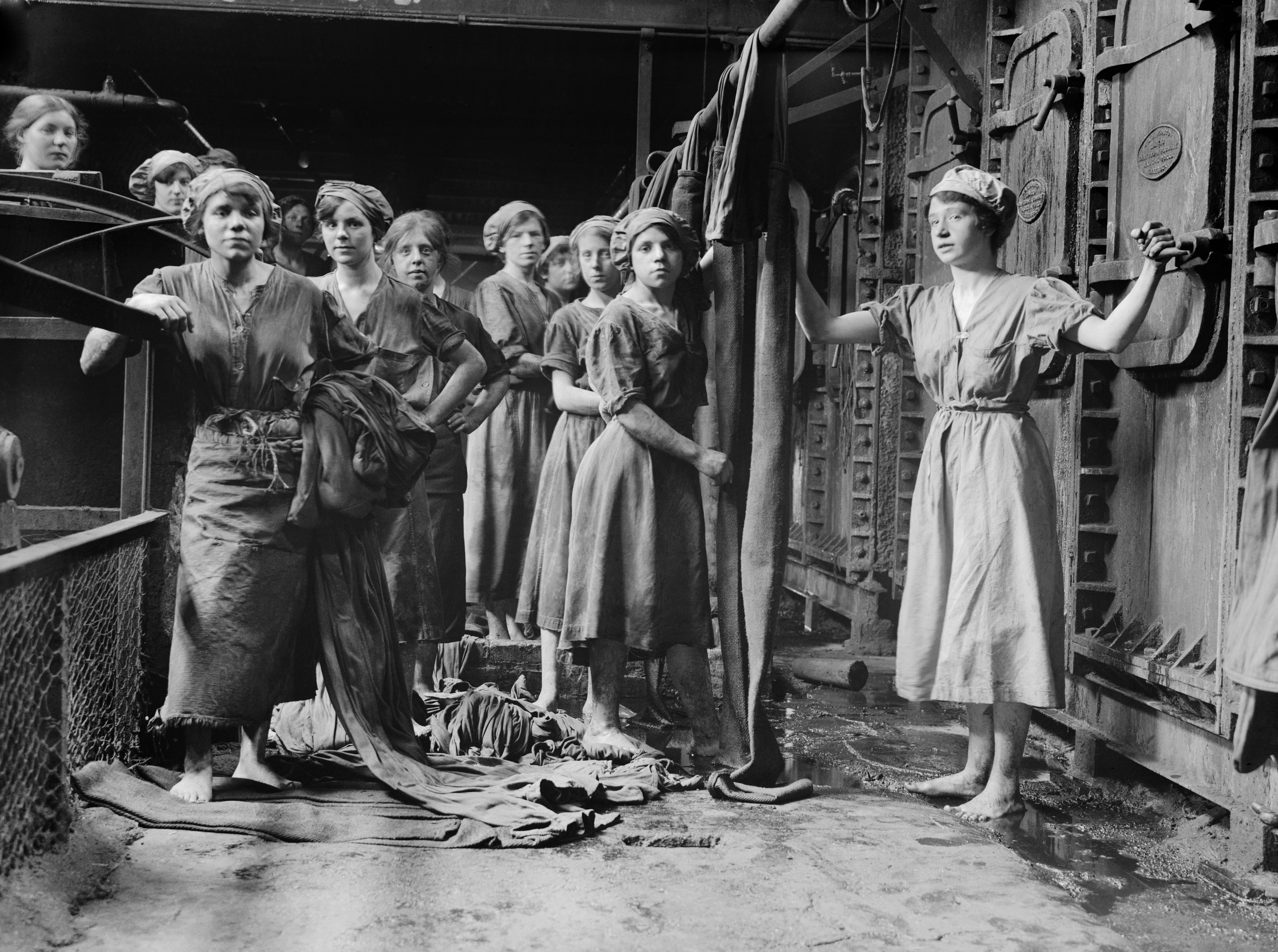
Factory workers at the Glebe Sugar Refinery, November 1918

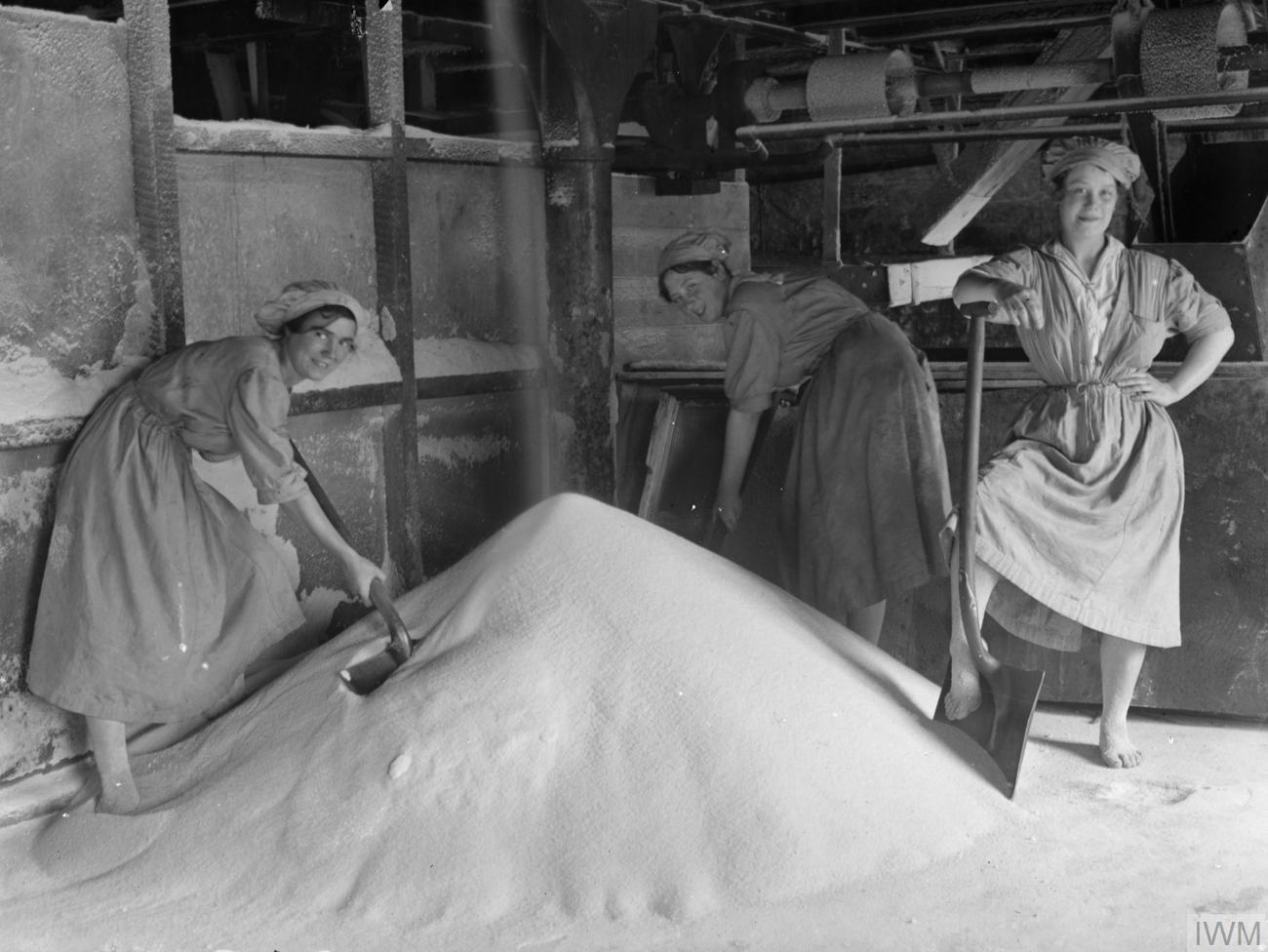
Workers shoveling sugar at Glebe Sugar Refinery

The British refining industry started in about 1544, when two sugar refineries were established in London. These were also known as 'sugar houses'. At first, their success was limited because of the strong competition from Antwerp. After the fall of Antwerp in 1585, the sugar refining industry in London expanded. The first sugar refinery in Bristol was started in 1607, when Robert Aldworth founded a single pan refinery. Sugar trade and refining would become the main source of prosperity for Bristol in the 18th century. At one time, there were some 20 refineries in Bristol. In Liverpool, the first sugar refinery was established in 1667.

The sugar refinery industry in Scotland started in 1667. By 1715 there were refineries on the Atlantic coast in Glasgow and on the North Sea coast in Leith. However, the real center of the Scottish refining industry would be established in Glasgow's outport Greenock. Here, the first sugar refinery was established in 1765. Up till 1826 five others followed. By 1869 there were 14 sugar refineries in Greenock, with the two largest processing 14,000 tons of sugar per week. Four more sugar refineries were also located on the River Clyde, and two were in Leith. Glasgow was an important center for the production of the very heavy machinery required for cane sugar mills. This probably contributed to the growth of Greenock as a center for sugar refining, which required lighter, but comparable machinery.

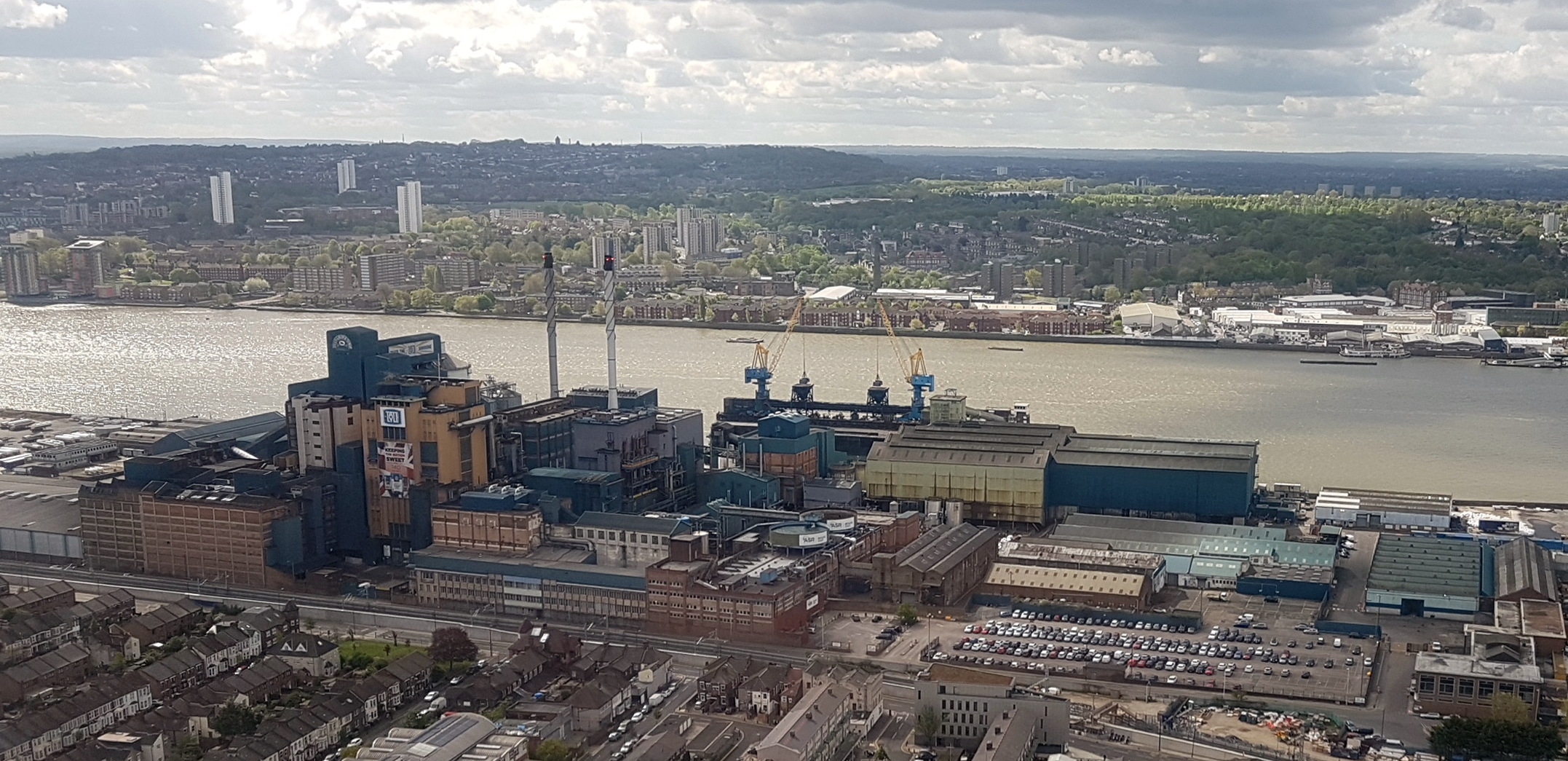
ASR's Tate & Lyle Thames refinery in Silvertown, London

In 1859 Henry Tate (1819–1899) became a partner in a sugar refinery in Liverpool, which he soon came to control. In 1872 his company Henry Tate & Sons opened the Love Lane refinery in the same city. In 1878 it opened the Thames Refinery at Silvertown in East London. Abram Lyle (1820–) became an important ship owner. In 1865 he bought part of the Glebe Sugar Refinery, but left it again in 1881. In 1883 he opened the Plaistow Refinery in London, only 1.5 miles from the Thames Refinery. In 1921 the two companies merged to become Tate & Lyle, a company that refined about 50% of the UK's sugar.

After World War I, the British Sugar refining industry went downhill. The war made the government see the dangers of completely relying on cane sugar imports, and so the cultivation of sugar beet, processed in beet sugar factories was promoted. In 1973 the accession of the UK to the European Union meant that the British refining industry had to deal with European legislation, which favored production in Europe. In 2010 Tate & Lyle sold its sugar refining business to American Sugar Refining, which was also allowed to use the name for these activities.

=== In Germany ===
In Germany, Hamburg was an early center of sugar refineries, rivalling the importance of Amsterdam. By 1727 there were about 200 refineries (known as Zuckersiederei) in Hamburg, dominating the German market. From 1830 to 1850 this Hamburg industry was almost completely annihilated. Hamburg's last cane sugar refinery was the Dampfzuckersiederei von 1848, which closed down in 1885.

After discovery of the process to acquire sugar from sugar beets, many sugar factories were founded to produce raw beet sugar. Near Magdeburg there were about 400 of these, one in almost every village. In 1894 these raw sugar factories founded the Hildesheim Sugar Refinery Zücker Raffinerie Hildesheim which processed their raw beet sugar. In 1913 it was estimated that 63% of German sugar beets were turned into raw sugar which was then processed in a separate sugar refinery. In the United States this percentage was zero. This caused a lot of confusion.

In 1938 the Hildesheim Sugar Refinery acquired the Zuckerraffinerie Braunschweig and closed it down the next year. Eventually the concentration of raw sugar factories meant that (central) refineries became superfluous. The raw (beet) sugar factories became so big that it became sensible to process raw beet sugar on-site instead of at a separate factory.

=== In the United States ===
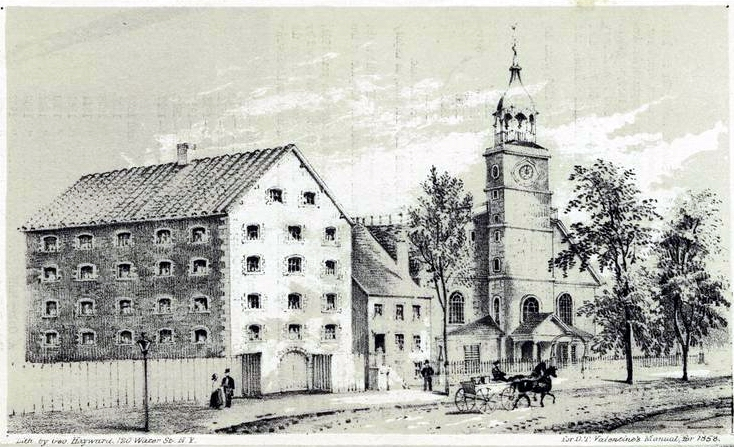
The Old Sugar house in New York, c. 1830

In 1833 an overview of the United States Sugar refineries was made. At the time, only three refineries had switched to evaporation in vacuum. The rest still relied on traditional methods.

In Philadelphia there were 12 sugar refineries in 1833. These could process 14,000,000 pounds of raw sugar The refinery of Canby & Lovering used steam power and vacuum pans, but was about to be joined by another. The refinery of J.G. Smith & Son on Vine street was spacious and clean. The refinery of Paul Lajus & Co. on Bread Street had switched to the French method. This involved bascule pans hung on chains, which were far more effective than fixed pans, when open fire was used for evaporation.

In New York, the sugar refineries could process about 9,000,000 pounds of raw sugar. Slightly more than half would become refined sugar, a quarter became bastard sugar, and another quarter became molasses. The Steam Congress Company Archibald & Delafield used steam power and vacuum pans. The refinery of Teaman, Tobias & Co. on Liberty street was a wealthy company established in the building known as The Old Sugar House. The refinery of Meday & Ritter was also respectable. A refinery on the French method used steam for heating, but not for evaporation.

In Baltimore, there were 9 sugar refineries in 1833. In the past, these refineries used to refine 9-10 million pounds of raw sugar from Cuba and Brazil, but in 1833 the Baltimore refineries were in serious trouble, and only about 2 million pounds were processed. A large steam and vacuum factory had burned down, and had not been rebuilt. The refinery of G.W. and H. Miller on Concord Street was still doing quite well. It benefitted from an abundant supply of fresh water, and clay from nearby Federal Hill. In Boston there were three refineries owned by Mr. Doane, Mr. Andrews and Mr. White. Together with a refinery in Salem these processed about 2,000,000 pounds of raw sugar.

Towards the west, the sugar refineries of New Orleans were rather atypical, because they had many sugar cane plantations in the surroundings. The New Orleans Sugar Refinery was a massive establishment, employing about 100 workers. It used vacuum pans and steam power. New Orleans also had a small refinery using the old methods. In Cincinnati there was a struggling sugar refinery which relied on raw sugar from New Orleans.

In 1974 there were 29 sugar refineries in the USA.

== Raw sugar processing ==
=== Raw sugar storage ===
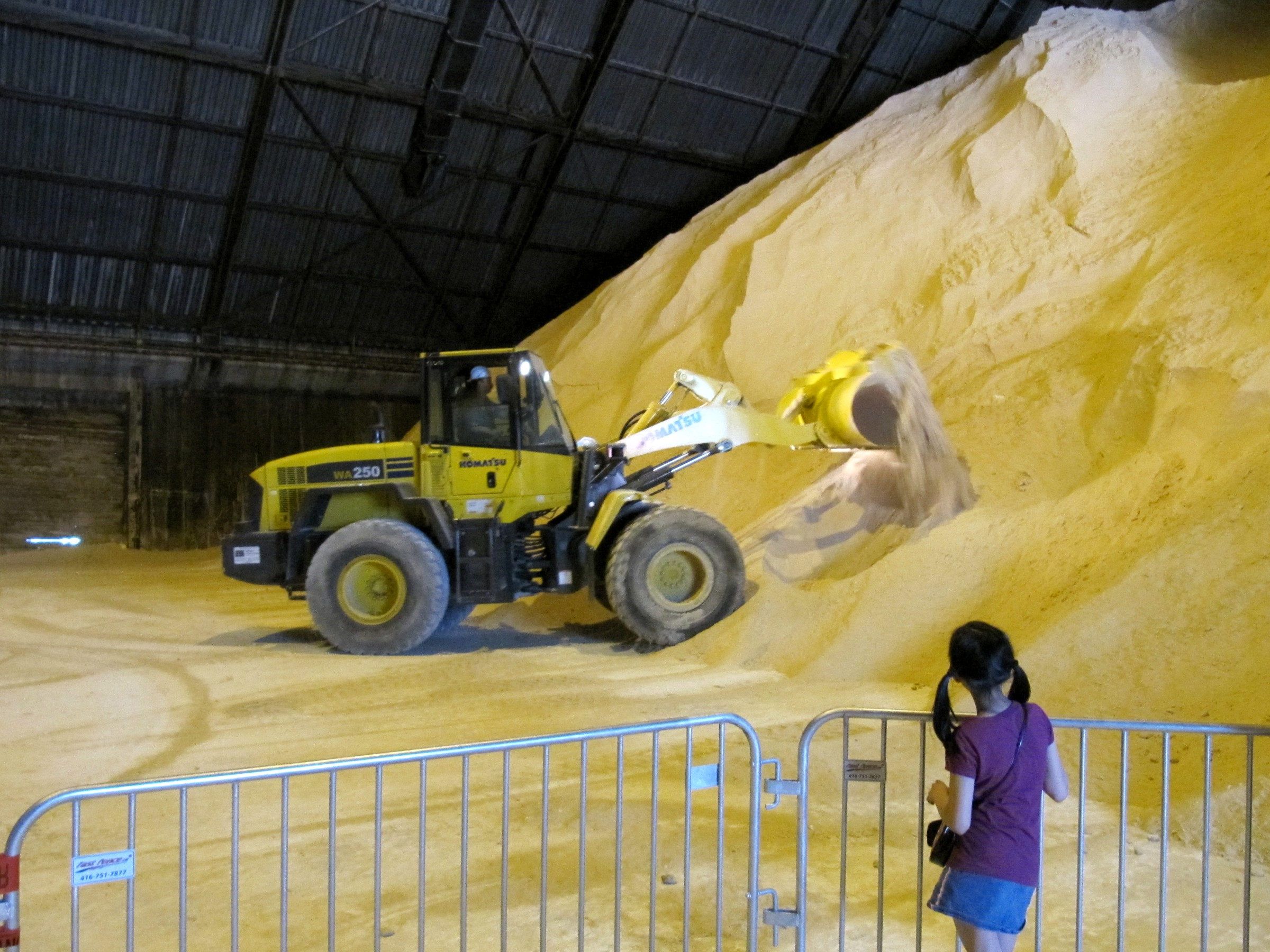
Raw sugar storage in a sugar refinery

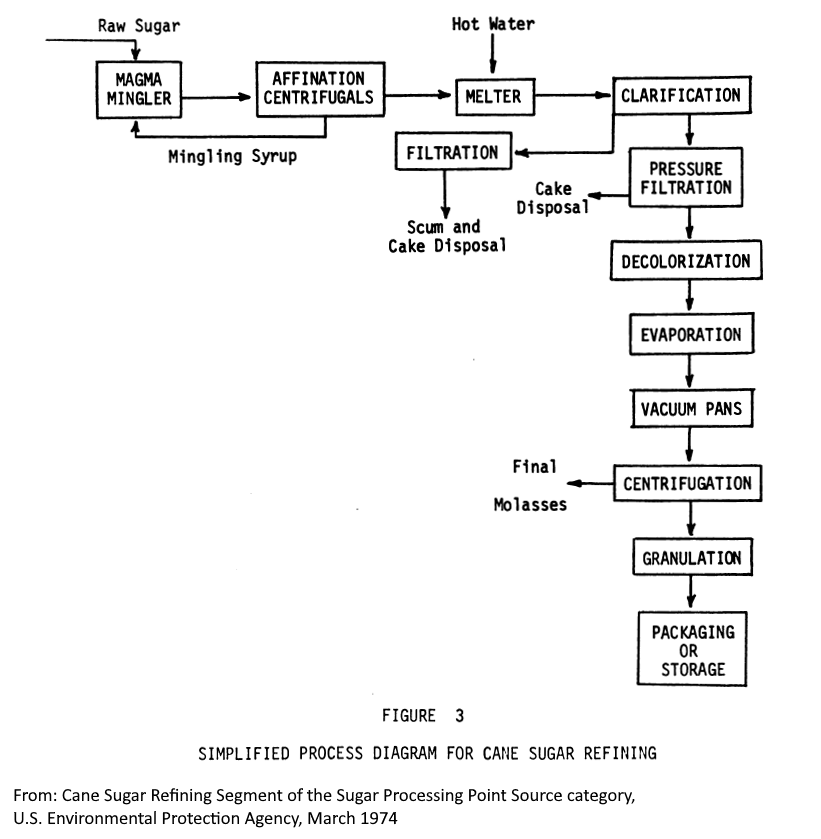
Cane Sugar Refinery process USA 1974

Raw sugar may be stored for months at both the sugar mill and the sugar refinery. While stored, the raw sugar crystals are still surrounded by a fine film of molasses left by the final crystallization step at the sugar mill. This film of molasses offers an incubator for microbial growth, leading to quality loss related to storage.

=== Affination ===
Sugar purity is measured by polarity, which reflects the percentage of sucrose. Nowadays many sugar refineries buy such high pol sugar that they can do without the affination process.

The purpose of the affination step is to remove the molasses film / coating that still surrounds the raw sugar crystals while minimizing any dissolving of the crystals. The raw sugar is dropped into a mixer, typically a trough of about 35 feet length by 3 feet width and 4 feet depth. Here it is mixed with affination syrup to form a mixture called 'magma' of about 92 Brix. It exits the mingler into a mixer through a grating that catches foreign matter and hard lumps. The mixer is typically a 37.5 feet long, 3 ft 4 inches wide and 8 ft 6 inches high. Here the magma is mixed and heated at a temperature between 43 and 60 °C. At the bottom of the mixer are chutes to the centrifuges.

In the centrifuges, the syrup is separated from the magma by pushing it through the retaining screen in the centrifuge's side. This leaves the crystals in the centrifuge and also a residual syrup film that is removed by hot-water (82 °C+) washing of the crystals while still in the basket. The washed crystals are then plowed from the centrifuge.

This 'affination sugar' is then brought to the melter. This typically is a round tank of 12 feet diameter and 6 feet height. Here the sugar is mixed with high-purity sweetwater and agitated by paddles. This mixture is heated by steam, melting the crystals in the sweetwater to form a liquor commonly called melt liquor.

=== Purification ===
The purification step consists of combinations of clarification and decolorization. All clarification treatments include mixing the melted liquor with hot milk of lime (a suspension of calcium hydroxide in water). This treatment precipitates a number of impurities, including multivalent anions such as sulfate, phosphate, citrate and oxalate, which precipitate as their calcium salts and large organic molecules such as proteins, saponins and pectins, which aggregate in the presence of multivalent cations. In addition, the alkaline conditions convert the simple sugars, glucose and fructose, along with the amino acid glutamine, to chemically stable carboxylic acids. Left untreated, these sugars and amines would eventually frustrate crystallization of the sucrose. The most important clarification processes are carbonatation and phosphatation.

If carbonatation is applied, carbon dioxide is bubbled through the alkaline sugar solution, precipitating the lime as calcium carbonate (chalk). The chalk particles entrap some impurities and absorb others. A recycling process builds up the size of chalk particles and a natural flocculation occurs where the heavy particles settle out in tanks (clarifiers). A final addition of more carbon dioxide precipitates more calcium from solution; this is filtered off, leaving a cleaner, golden light-brown sugar solution called "thin juice".

If phosphatation is applied, the melted liquor is heated to 60-70 °C and a bit of phosphoric acid is added. The mixture is immediately limed to pH 7.0-8.0. It then enters a clarifier at one end and is heated to 88 °C while flowing through it. This forms a flocculent precipitate of calcium phosphate, entrapping some impurities and absorbing others. This floats to the top of the tank, where it is skimmed off by paddles.

Decolorization follows after both carbonatation and phosphatation, which are both ended by filtering out finely dispersed particulate matter. The filtered clarified liquor can be decolorized by several means. Bone char consists of sintered long bones of cattle. It achieves decolorization, but also removes colloidal material and a considerable amount of ash. Activated charcoal (GAC) by itself removes only color. Both are generally used in cylindrical 20–25 feet high columns of about 10 feet diameter through which the liquor is slowly filtered. Some modern plants use somewhat smaller cylinders with ion-exchange resins. These operate much faster.

=== Evaporation ===
The decolorized liquor is then fed to an evaporator. This is a closed vessel heated by steam and placed under a vacuum. The basic principle is that the juice enters the evaporator at a temperature higher than its boiling temperature under the reduced pressure, or is heated to this temperature. This results in a flash evaporation, which allows for concentration by multiple-effect evaporation. In the 1970s the American sugar refiners generally used double or triple effect evaporation.

The result is "thick juice", roughly 60% sucrose by weight and similar in appearance to maple syrup. It is also sterilized with UV light. Thick juice can be stored in tanks for later processing, spreading the load on later steps of the crystallization plant.

=== Crystallization ===
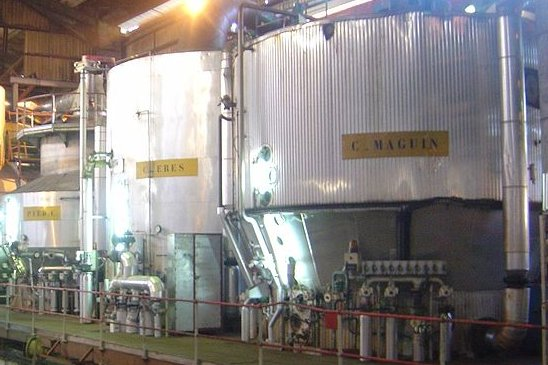
Vacuum pans

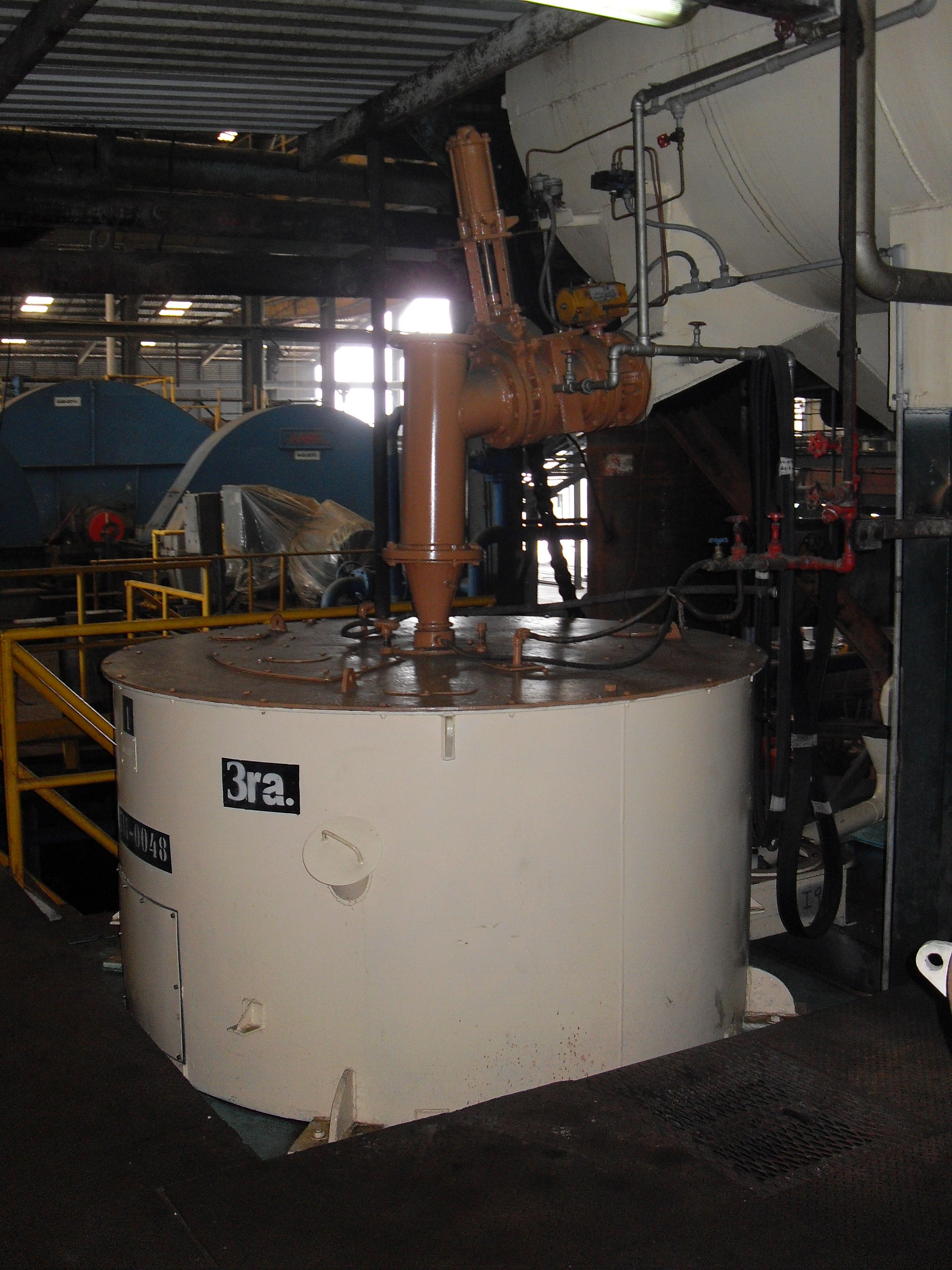
Continuous sugar centrifugal for recovery products

Thick juice is mixed with low grade crystal sugar recycled from other parts of the process in a melter and filtered giving "standard liquor". The crystallization phase starts by feeding the standard liquor to the vacuum pans, typically at 76 Brix. These pans are essentially single-effect evaporators, with their own vacuum source and condenser.

The sugar solution has to be supersaturated in order to grow sugar crystals. There are three phases of supersaturation, which is determined by the sucrose concentration and temperature. In the metastable phase existing crystals grow, but no new ones are formed. By using seed crystals and keeping the vacuum pan in the metastable phase, a uniform size of crystals is produced.

The seed crystals are introduced, typically as a slurry of known particle size and amount, into the pan. Once the initial crystals are established, further standard liquor is supplied to the pan as the crystals grow until they reach the desired size.

The resulting sugar crystal and syrup mix is called a massecuite, from "cooked mass" in French. The syrup is called mother liquor, because the crystals grow from this liquor. The massecuite content of one pan is called a strike.

The massecuite is then passed to the centrifuges, where the crystals are separated from the syrup by centrifugal force. The crystals remain in the centrifuge, and are washed with hot water to remove any remaining syrup. The pure crystalline sugar is then removed from the centrifuge and sent to the dryer-cooler.

One massecuite normally leads to four strikes, the first one and three re-melts. This is done by feeding the syrup left over from the first strike (known as first jet or first syrup) to another pan. The second strike creates more crystals, as well as jet 2, and so on. Jet 3 and 4 syrup are often used in producing soft sugars, and in affination.

=== Granulation ===
Granulated sugar is sugar in which the individual sugar grains do not clump together. This is achieved by drying. The dryers or granulators are typically horizontal rotating drums of 1.5 to 2.4 m diameter and a length of 7.6 to 11 m. In these steam heated air removes moisture from the crystals, so that the moisture content decreases from about 1 percent to 0.02 percent or less. The granulator also separates the crystals from each other . The crystals are then sent to the cooler. There are machines that combine drying and cooling.

=== White sugar storage ===
The finished product is stored in large concrete or steel silos. It is shipped in bulk, big bags or 25–50 kg (55–110 pounds) bags to industrial customers or packed in consumer-size packages to retailers.

The dried sugar must be handled with caution, as sugar dust explosions are possible. For example, a sugar dust explosion which led to 13 fatalities was the 2008 Georgia sugar refinery explosion in Port Wentworth, GA.

== Byproducts ==
- Molasses – dark-colored, sugar-rich byproduct from raw sugar crystallization
- Bagasse – fibrous byproduct from juice extraction

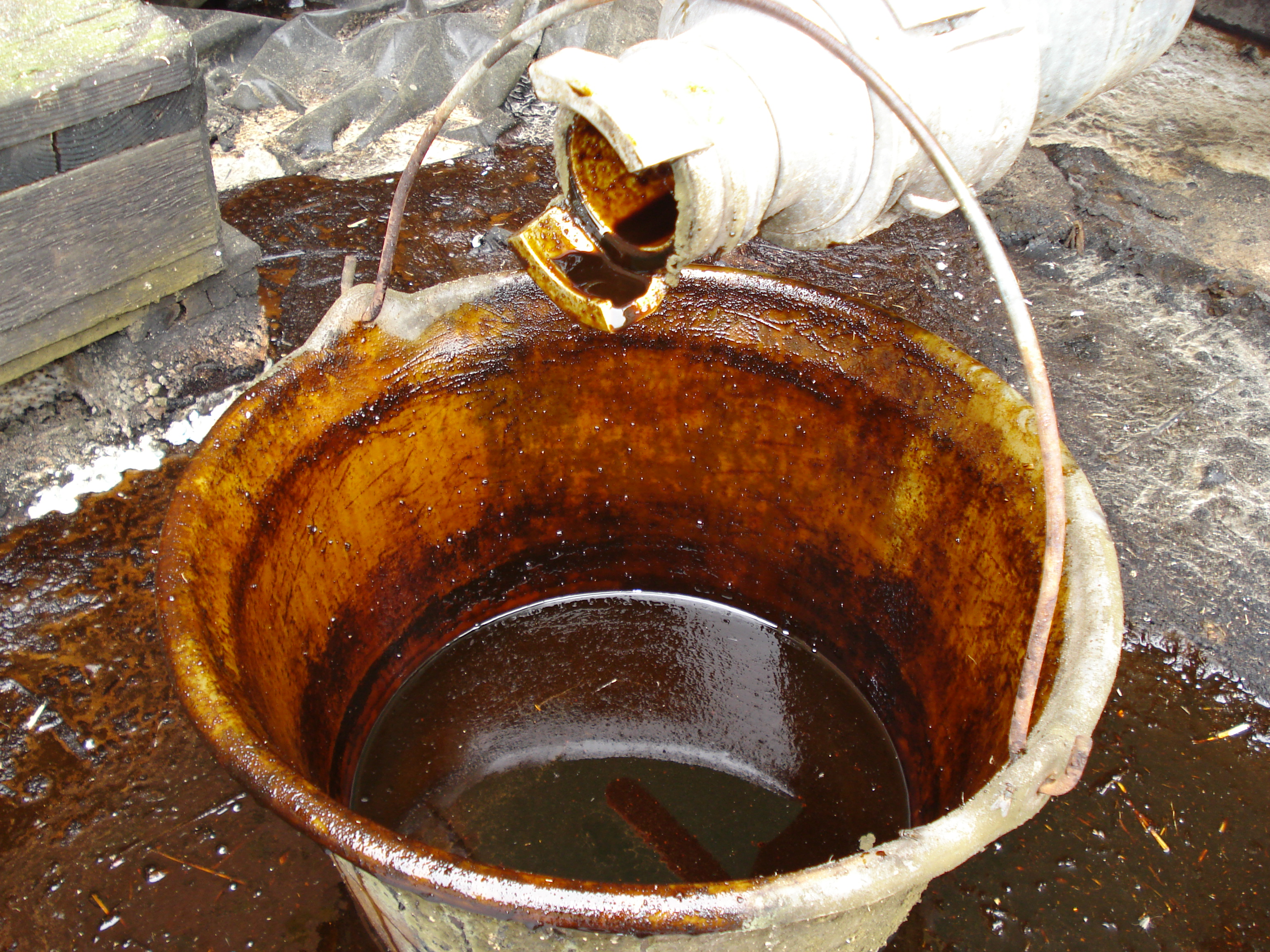
Sugar beet molasses used as cattle fodder supplement

Many road authorities in North America use desugared beet molasses as de-icing or anti-icing products in winter control operations. The molasses can be used directly, combined with liquid chlorides and applied to road surfaces, or used to treat the salt spread on roads. Molasses can be more advantageous than road salt alone because it reduces corrosion and lowers the freezing point of the salt-brine mix, so the deicers remain effective at lower temperatures. Adding the liquid to rock salt also reduces the bounce and scatter of the rock salt, keeping it where it is needed, and reduces the activation time of the salt to begin the melting process.

== Factory automation in sugar refineries ==
As in many other industries factory automation has been promoted heavily in sugar refineries in recent decades. The production process is generally controlled by a central process control system, which directly controls most of the machines and components. Only for certain special machines such as the centrifuges in the sugar house decentralized PLCs are used for security reasons.

== Bibliography ==
- Baines, Thomas (1852). History of the Commerce and Town of Liverpool: And of the Rise of manufacturing industry in the surrounding counties.
- Basset, N. (1875). Guide pratique du fabricant de sucre. Librairie du dictionnnaire des arts et manufactures.
- Brande, William Thomas (1850). "The theory and practice of the manufacture of sugar". The Repertory of Patent Inventions: 174–187.
- Chou, Chung Chi (2000). Handbook of Sugar Refining. John Wiley & Sons. ISBN 9780471183570.
- Cane Sugar Refining Segment of the Sugar Processing Point source category. U.S. Environmental Protection Agency. 1974.
- "Hildesheimer Geschichte(n)".
- Jones, Donald (1996). Bristol's Sugar Trade and Refining Industry (PDF). Bristol Branch of the Historical association.
- Kent, James A. (2012). Handbook of Industrial Chemistry and Biotechnology 12th edition. Vol. I. Springer. ISBN 9781461442592.
- Koyikkal, Srikumar (8 April 2013). Chemical Process Technology and Simulation. PHI Learning Pvt. Ltd. ISBN 9788120347090.
- "Abram Lyle".
- Mackintosh, John (1888). The History of Civilisation in Scotland. Vol. IV. A. Brown & Co. Aberdeen.
- Mitchell, Donald O. (2004). Sugar Policies: Opportunity for Change. World Bank Publications.
- Onses, Richard (May 1987). "Continuous dissolution process for sugar". Alimentación, equipos y tecnología. Madrid: Alción. ISSN 0212-1689.
- Petersson, Astrid (1998). Zuckersiedergewerbe und Zuckerhandel in Hamburg im Zeitraum von 1814 bis 1834. Franz Steiner Verlag, Stuttgart. ISBN 9783515072656.
- Reisig, Jan Hendrik (1793). De suikerraffinadeur; of volledige beschrijving van het suiker, etc [The sugar refiner; or complete description of sugar etc.]. A. Blussé en Zoon.
- Rössler, Horst (2007). "Germans from Hanover in the British Sugar Industry, 1750-1900". Migration and Transfer from Germany to Britain 1660 to 1914. München: K.G. Saur. ISBN 9783110918410.
- Silliman, Benjamin (1833). Manual on the Cultivation of the Sugar Cane: And the Fabrication and Refinement of Sugar. Secretary of the Treasury.
- Stow, John (1753). A survey of the cities of London and Westminster. Vol. II. Cooper, Reeve, Sympson, London.
- "Henry Tate".
- Hearings before a subcommittee of the committee on the judiciary United States Senate. Vol. 1. Government printing office, Washington. 1913.
