= Glebe Sugar Refinery =

Former Scottish Sugar Refinery

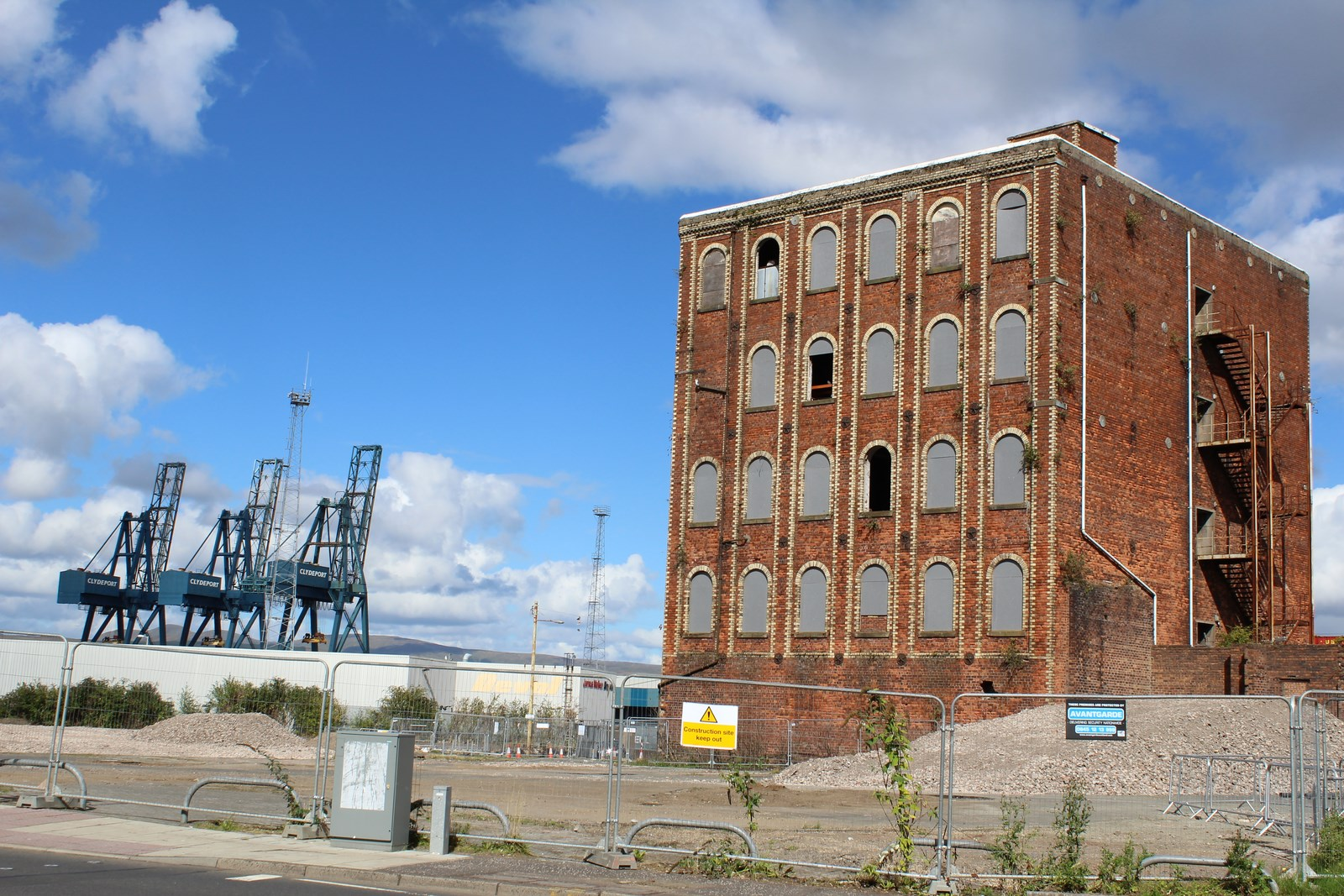
- Part of the sugar refinery in 2013. Port cranes in the background.
- Built: From 1831
- Location: Greenock
- Coordinates: 55.95307°N 4.7626°W
- Industry: Sugar industry

The Glebe Sugar Refinery is a building in Greenock, Scotland. For almost a century, the sugar refinery was an independent company. It was known under different names. It became a daughter company of Tate & Lyle in 1929.

The remaining building is of interest as a reminder of the major Greenock sugar refining industry. The site is also known for a series of photos illustrating the (re)entrance of female workers into the labor force during World War I. Attempts are underway to preserve the building.

== History ==
The town of Greenock (c. 40,000 inh) developed on a narrow strip of land on the south shore of the Firth of Clyde. By 1832, it was the chief harbor of Glasgow and neighbouring counties. Its quays extended into deep water, facilitating cheap loading for even the biggest vessels of the time. This had led to the development of shipyards, sail manufactories, roperies, an iron foundry, and a paper mill. Cooperage was another related industry that developed.

By 1832, Greenock was said to not be a manufacturing town yet. However, in the hills just south of the town, a stream had been diverted to provide hydraulic power. At the time, this was used by a paper mill, a flour mill, and a sail factory. It was therefore expected that a manufacturing industry would soon develop in the town. There were also five sugar houses active in Greenock, but these were obvously not important enough to be noted.

The art of refining sugar had come to Britain in about 1550. In Scotland sugar refineries were subsequently built in places like Edinburgh, Leith and Dundee. In 1669, a sugar refinery was built in Glasgow, followed by one in Port Glasgow and, in 1765, one in Greenock. By the mid 19th century, two centers of sugar refining remained: Glasgow and its outport Greenock.

By 1863, Greenock had become the center of sugar refining in Scotland. It had 14 refineries over Glasgow's four and Port Glasgow's single refinery. The abundant supply of soft water (fresh water with low mineral content) was the main reason for the concentration in Greenock. Other advantages were the deep sea port, available warehouses, and railway connections. Some refineries had been set up to profit from the available hydraulic power.

=== The Greenock Glebe ===
A glebe is an area of land meant to support a parish priest. In Greenock, the Glebe stretched from the Old Manse north of Old West Kirk (before this building was moved) towards the west. It contained the streets: Clarence Street. Crawfurd Street, Nelson Street, Ardgowan Street, York Street, and Boyd Street.

== Greenock Sugar Refining Company ==
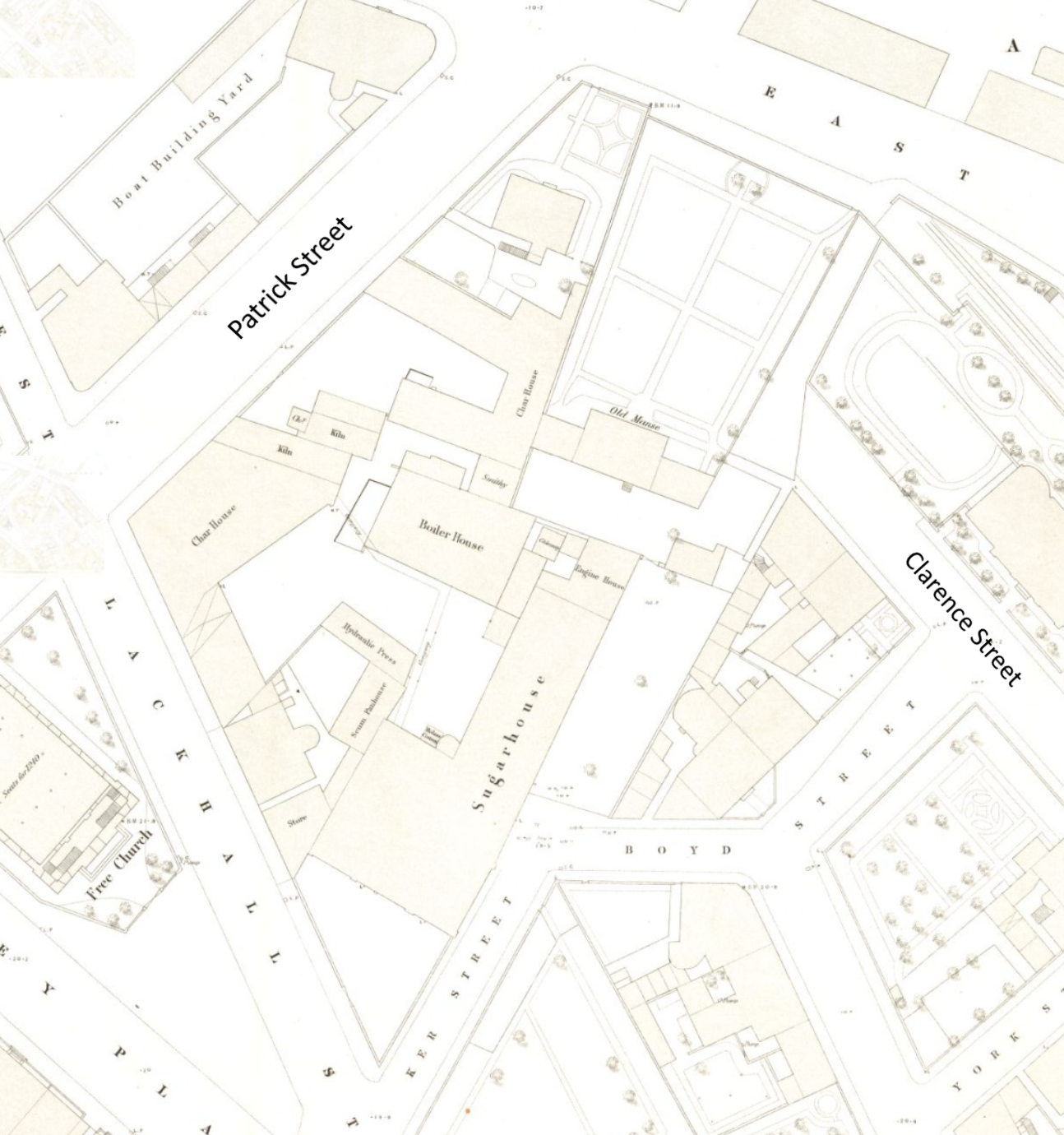
The sugar house on Ker Street in 1857

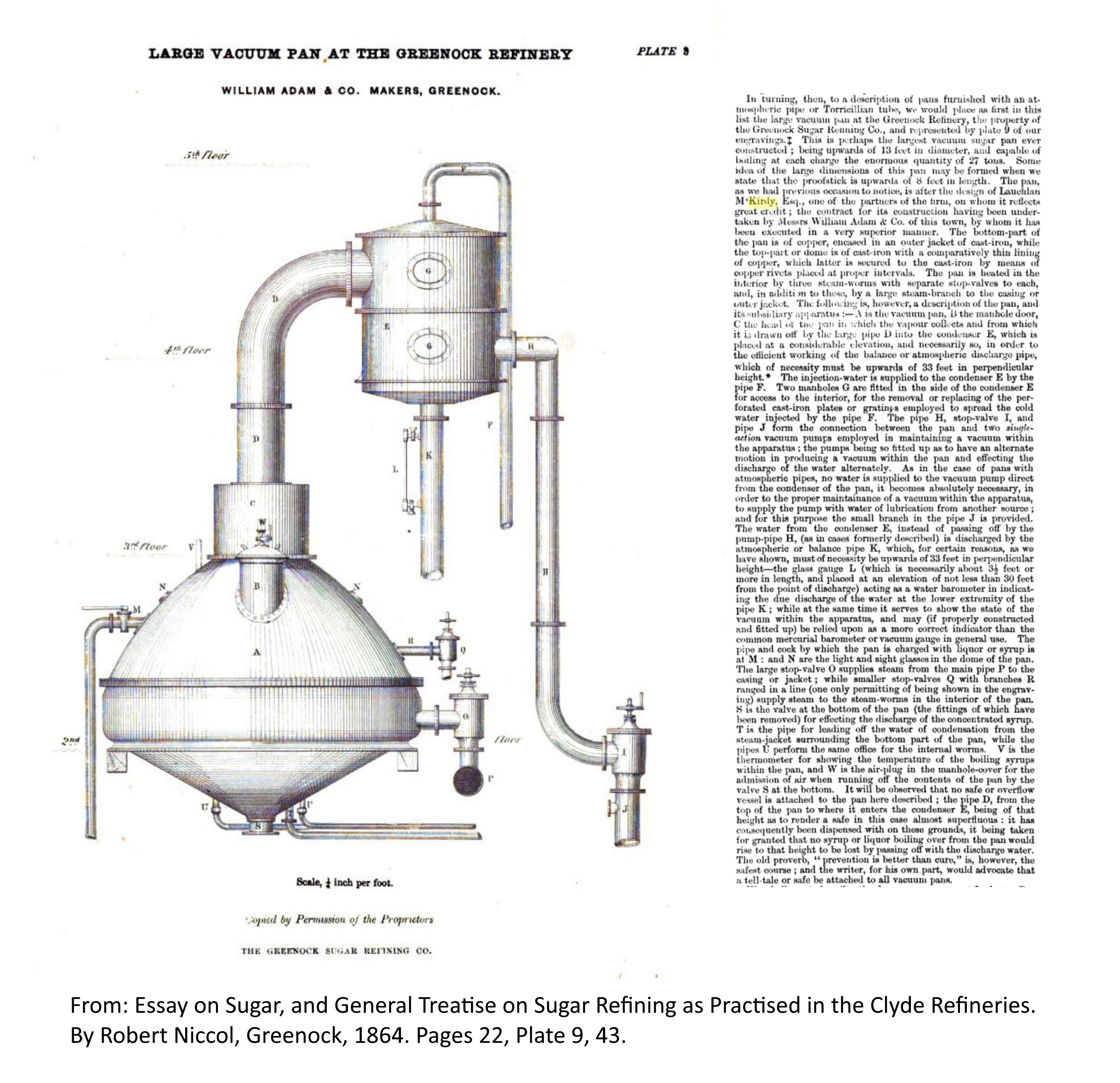
Vacuum Pan at the Greenock Refinery

In 1831, Thomas Young and Co. built the predecessor of Glebe Sugar Refinery as the eight sugar house built in Greenock. This sugar house was located on Ker Street, part of the Glebe. It had another entrance on West Blackhall Street. The sugar refinery was subsequently expanded. In 1845, it became the property of James Fairrie & Co., who further expanded it in 1847 and 1854. There is actually a good 1857 map that shows the Glebe Sugar Refinery as it then stood on that location. On the map, the designations: sugarhouse, engine house, char house, boiler house, hydraulic press, scum panhouse, and kiln all refer to parts of this complex, which took up almost the whole block.

In 1858, the Greenock Sugar Refining Company acquired this sugar house. The company began a large modernization and expansion of the complex. In 1861, it put into use what was probably the largest vacuum sugar pan ever constructed. This was able to boil charges of 25-26 tons of sugar in 4-4.5 hours. This pan had been designed by Mr. Kirdy, one of the partners of the Greenock Sugar Refining Company.

When the predecessor of the Glebe Sugar Refinery was founded, there was already another Sugar House on the Glebe. In 1811/12 a sugar refinery known as Glebe Sugar House was built in Crawford Street. Eventually, it consisted of a square of buildings between Ardgowan Street, Nelson Street, Clarence Street, and Crawford street. This was a very different location from where the last Glebe Sugar Refinery now stands.

The Glebe Sugar House was first owned by William Leitch & Co. In 1843, it became the property of Connal & Parker, later of E. Connal & Co. The refinery was burned in 1849. By 1853, the Glebe Sugar house had been turned into a warehouse used by R. Thorne & Sons.

Apart from the refinery itself, the Glebe Sugar House had another plot of land near the end of Patrick Street. In 1862 a Mr. Allision valued this property at L 3,000 on behalf of Messrs. Kirdy and Steele, when they bought it for the Greenock Sugar Company. The Greenock Sugar Refining Company then built a store on this terrain.

In the early 1860s, the Greenock Sugar Refining Company got into trouble. The partnership between Kirdy and Steele was suspended on 16 February 1865.

== Glebe Sugar Refinery Company ==
In 1865, the Glebe Sugar Refinery Company acquired the possessions of the Greenock Sugar Refining Company. This company consisted of the partners: Abram Lyle, John Kerr, Charles P Hunter, Mr. Walter Grieve and Provost James Johnston Grieve.

=== Railway compensation case ===
The acquisition of the Greenock Sugar Refining Company by the Glebe Sugar Refinery Company soon caused a kind of scandal. In the 1840s, the government had made plans to improve the port of Greenock. This led to the construction of Albert Harbour starting in 1860/61. In order to gain good (railway) access, the harbor authorities had attempted to acquire the plot of land belonging to the Glebe Sugar House. It was said that it agreed to the acquisition by the Greenock Sugar Refining Company on condition that it would get a part of the terrain for making a road.

As mentioned above, the Glebe Sugar Refining Company bought the Greenock Sugar Refining Company in 1865. In March 1865, it bought the store for L3,000 while the seller was under pressure from creditors. Others said that the Glebe Sugar Refining Company bought the whole of The Greenock Sugar Refinery's's complex for L 27,000. This was alleged to be L 3.000 for the store and L 19,000 for the refinery, even though this does not add up.

That same year 1865, the Greenock and Ayrshire Railway wanted to establish a line to the new Albert Harbour. It paid L 20,000 for the store plot of 1,593 square yards, which had been sold for only L 3,000 a few years earlier. As it happened, the provost of the town and Mr. John Kerr were also directors of the railway. The whole thing came into the open, because of a disappropriation just west of the sugar refinery. The proprietor of some terrains over there claimed a much higher price than offered by the railway based on what had been paid to the Glebe Refining Company by the railway company. It led to a court session.

In November 1865, the harbor authorities made a claim on the company's grounds. The harbor trust intended to acquire the grounds north of the sugar refining works proper and on the south-east side of Patrick Street over a length of about 41 yards. In this area, the company had some offices.

The publication about the railway compensation case and its map, imply that the plot sold to the Railway company was the one that says 'old manse' on the 1857 map of the Sugar House on Ker Street. There is indeed a reference to the manse, garden, and offices having been feud to the company in 1862. The Gazette pulblication implies that the harbour trust bought the smaller terrain just west of that.

=== Under Abram Lyle ===
The Glebe Sugar Refinery soon became the largest in Greenock. Between 1867-69 it processed 16% of the raw sugar imported to Greenock. From 1870-74 this was 13%.

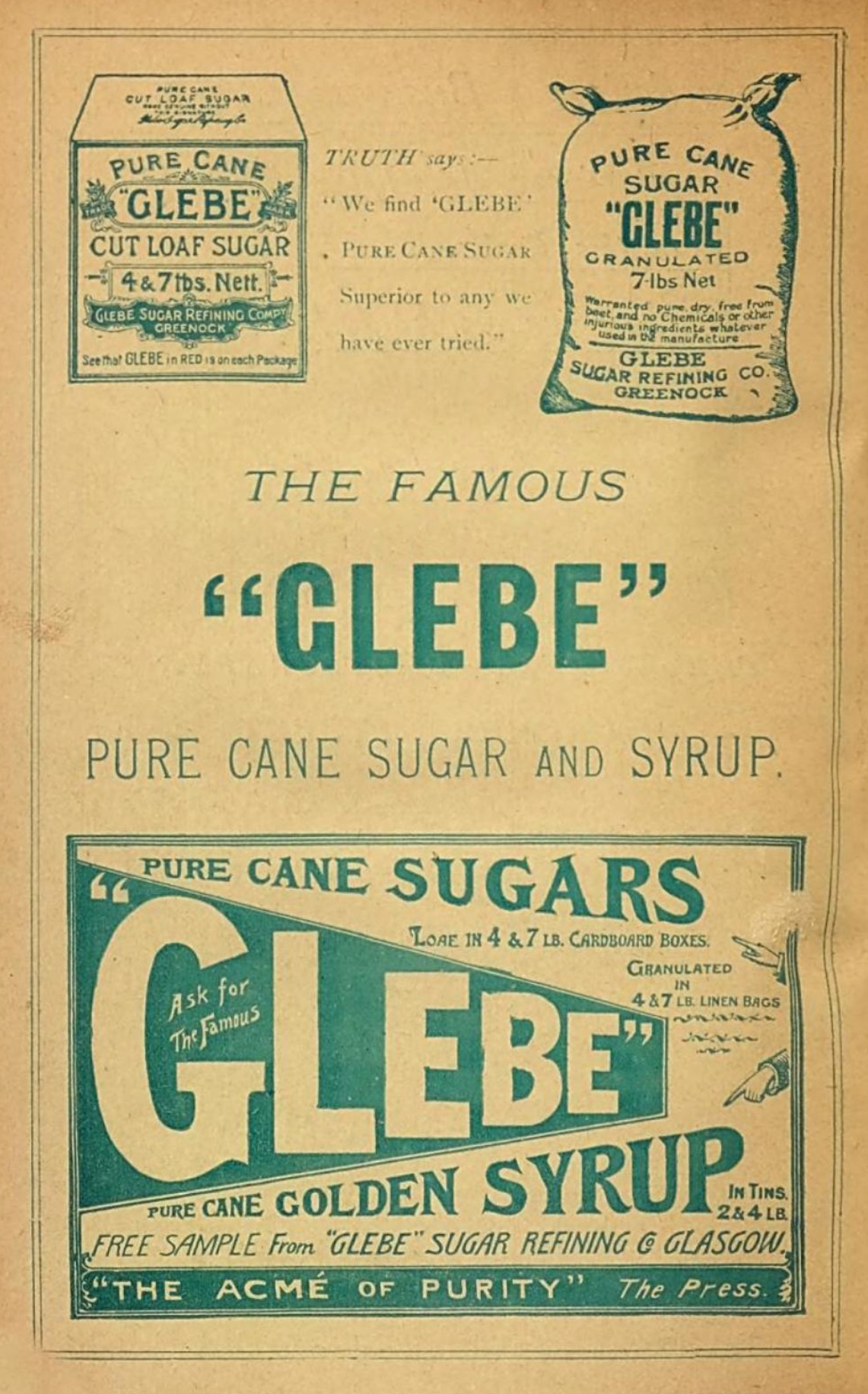
Glebe Sugar Refinery advert for pure cane sugar.

For the period between 1865 and 1880 some data is known about the refinery. In terms of cost, wages were the most important. The amount for coal was somewhat more than 60% of that paid for wages, but often substantially more. Cooperage cost came even closer to wages.

Abram Lyle was managing partner until 1873. That same year, his three sons became managing partners. In 1876 the refinery was modernized, receiving four new pans. In August 1879, the company was visited by an excursion of the Institute of Mechanical Engineers. The institute published an overview of its refining process and noted that Messrs. Lyle owned the refinery.

=== Under Messrs. Kerr ===
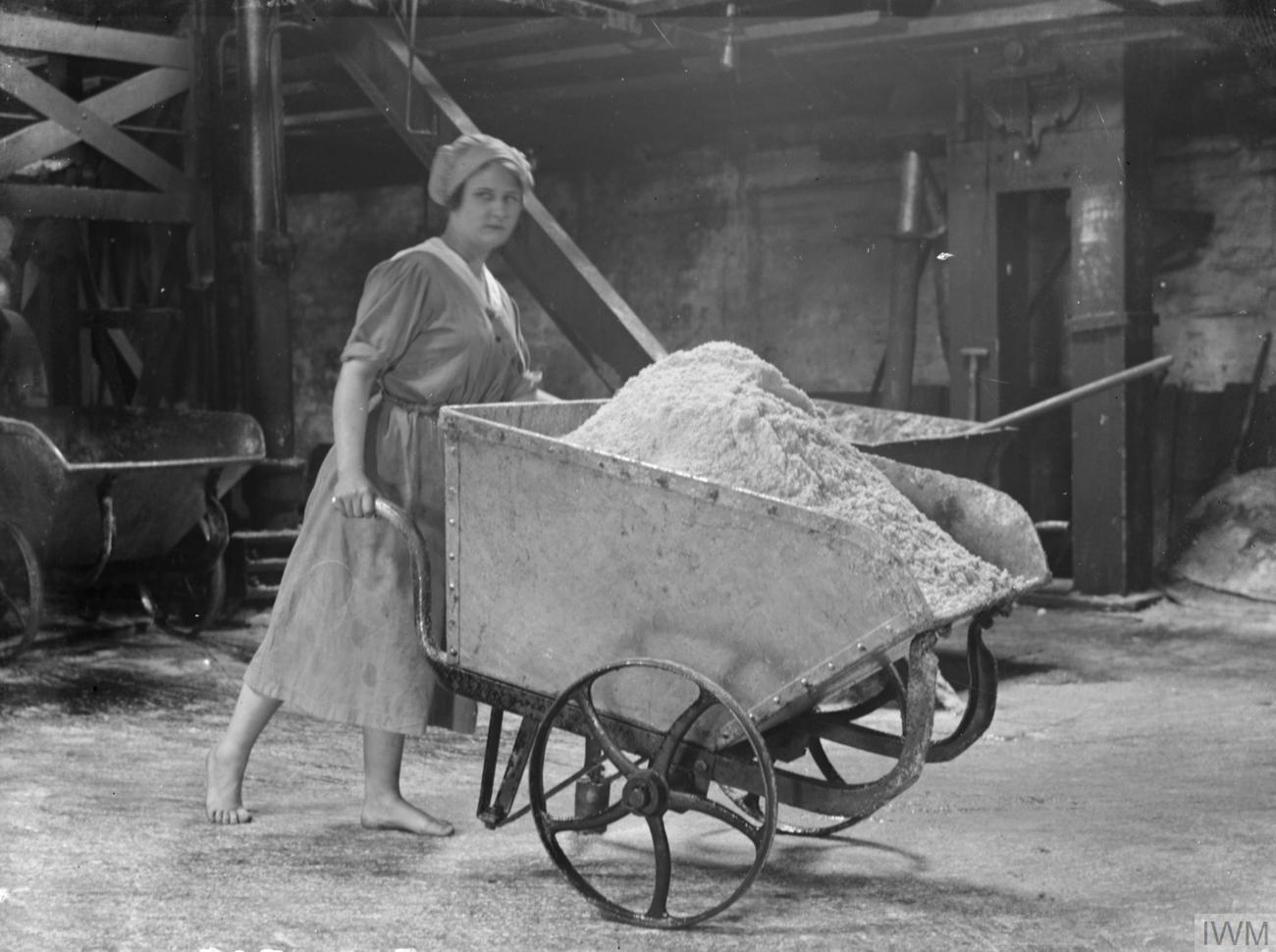
The company was forced to employ females during W.W. I

In 1881, Abram Lyle and his sons left the company. In 1882, the Lyle family then acquired a large refinery in London. At the Glebe, they were succeeded by the Messrs. Kerr.

In the 1880s, continental governments strongly subsidized their own sugar industry. They paid a bounty on raw sugar made from beet and an even higher bounty on refined sugar. This caused serious problems for the British refineries. In 1881, the total sugar consumption in the United Kingdom was 990,000 ton. In 1896, it was 1,424,000 ton. Meanwhile the production of the British refineries went down from 842,000 ton in 1884 to 623,000 ton in 1894. This was mainly due to the continental bounties on refined sugar.

The smaller bounties on the raw sugar made by continental beet sugar factories had a different effect. It made that in the United Kingdom raw beet sugar started to compete with raw sugar from cane. From 1882 to 1896, the use of raw beet sugar increased from 271,000 ton to 405,000 ton. Meanwhile, cane decreased from 709,000 ton to 408,000 ton.

While most refineries did not mind whether they refined cane or beet sugar, some did. The reason was that some consumers did prefer cane sugar. At first these were prepared to pay a small but significant premium for cane. By the mid-1980s, this premium had become insignificant. However, given the choice many consumers still preferred cane. In about 1880, the Crosfield refinery in Liverpool had therefore decided to only refine cane.

In September 1890, the Glebe Refinery also decided to refine only raw cane sugar. At the time, it was the largest sugar refinery in Greenock and refined several loads of sugar from Java and Mauritius. Its advertisements always stressed that its sugar was made from sugar cane.

The United Kingdom was not happy with the oversubsidized imports from the continent. This led to the 1902 Brussels convention. It abolished direct export subsidies and put a limit on other state subsidies. Even so, by the start of World War I, over half of the United Kingdom's sugar came from continental sugar beet.

During World War I, the United Kingdom discovered that relying solely on imported raw cane sugar was a strategic vulnerability. Continental beet sugar was at first replaced by refined cane sugar from Mauritius and Java. Later, the British relied on raw sugar from Cuba. Part of this was refined by American refiners.

World War I fostered social change as female workers (re-)entered the work force in the United Kingdom. It led to George P. Lewis and Peter Cattrell making a series of photographs of female workers at the Glebe for the Imperial War Museum.

Probably in about 1919-1920, the Glebe Sugar Refinery built an extension on the other side of Ker Street. This is the now still standing five-storey block constructed of red brick with contrasting yellow brick dressings. It is the only building that remains of the refinery. In 1919 it was connected to the refinery proper by a sugar bridge at the fifth floor.

After World War I, the British government supported the development of a national beet sugar industry. In 1922, it gave the emerging national sugar beet industry an advantage that was over ten times as high as what the abolished Brussels convention would have allowed. One of the challenges for the refiners was that by this time, most sugar factories were also producing their own refined, or quasi-refined, sugar.

In 1929, the Kerrs decided to liquidate the Glebe Sugar Refining Company. That is, to put an end to doing business and to sell all assets to pay debts.

== Part of Tate & Lyle ==
Tate & Lyle had been formed by a merger of the two leading British sugar refiners in 1921. The combination dominated the British refining industry. Tate & Lyle adapted effectively to the emergence of the native British beet sugar industry. It e.g. agreed with several sugar beet factories to buy their complete raw sugar production. In 1929 it acquired the Glebe Sugar Refinery and restarted it.

In 1933, the British sugar refiners and factories came to an agreement. By it, the factories were allowed to produce 5/19 part of the annual British refined sugar consumption. There would be no limit on the production of raw sugar. In 1937, the minister approved the sugar refining agreement between British Sugar and the British sugar refinerers. As the Glebe Sugar Refining Company was a party to this treaty it had obviously remained a separate, but not independent company. A quota system that was part of the agreement showed the size of the British refining companies.

Quota proportions
Company	Part
Tate & Lyle	74,965%
Martineaus	1,229%
Macfie & Sons	5,501%
Sankey Sugar Company	5,482%
John Walker & Co.	4,654%
Westburn Sugar Refiners	5,735%
Glebe Sugar Refining Co.	2,434%

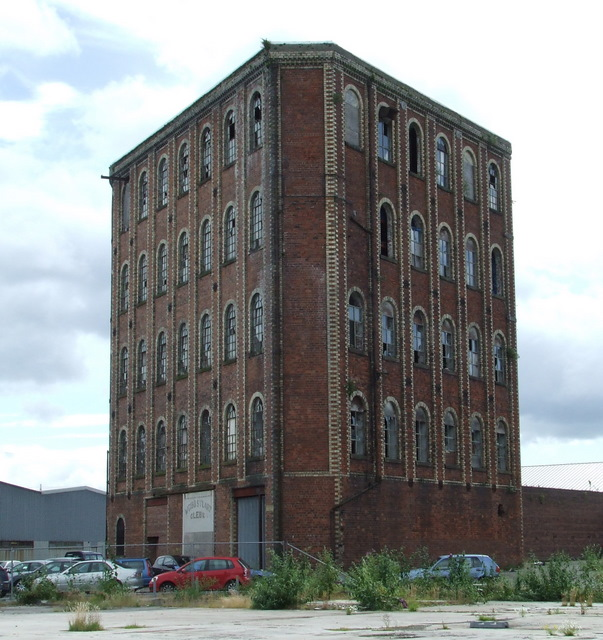
The remaining building in 2008

In the first phase of World War II, the Glebe Sugar Refinery was the smallest of the two intact Greenock sugar refineries. It was in care and maintenance mode until the bigger Westburn refinery was bombed. Later in the war, attempts were made to forcibly close smaller refineries, but these came to nothing.

After the war, the concentration in the sugar industry continued unabated. It meant that while the total sugar production increased, it was produced by an ever smaller number of factories and refineries. Of the two remaining refineries in Greenock, the Glebe was first to go. On 8 March 1968, liquidators were appointed to wind up the Glebe Sugar Refining Company Limited. On 23 September the shareholders had a final meeting to close the accounts.

== The remaining building ==
After it was closed down, most of the Glebe Sugar Refinery was demolished. What was left, was the almost triangular building that is now still standing east of the town's Aldi supermarket. Attempts are underway to preserve the building.
