= Boston Sugar Refinery =

Former sugar refinery based in East Boston, Massachusetts, U.S.

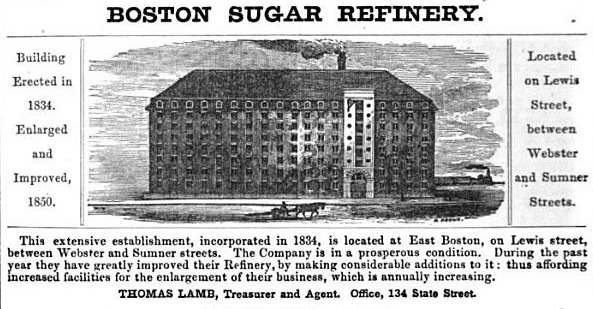
- An 1852 advertisement for Boston Sugar Refinery.
- Built: 1834
- Location: Lewis Street East Boston, Massachusetts, United States
- Coordinates: 42.37°N 71.04°W
- Industry: Sugar
- Area: 10,200 square feet (950 m^{2})
- Defunct: Yes

The Boston Sugar Refinery was a sugar refinery based in East Boston, Massachusetts, United States. The refinery was established in 1834, and in 1860 it was credited as the first refinery to create granulated sugar. Additionally, it was the first manufacturing business in East Boston.

== History ==
Since sugar refining was a specialized process, it required special machinery and skills, John Brown traveled to London and procured plans for a refinery there. Later, the eight-story brick building was built in East Boston on Lewis Street between Webster and Sumner Street on 220-square-foot (20 m^{2}) area of land purchased from the East Boston Wharf Company. Starting in 1834, it took two years to complete construction.

The main operation was initially run by a 25-horsepower steam engine, and 80 employees were employed. The refinery averaged 25,000 boxes annually. In 1846, Fisher's National Magazine and Industrial Record listed the refinery as employing 100 people refining 8,000,000 pounds (3,600,000 kg) pounds of sugar a year and using 3,000 short tons (6,000,000 pounds) of coal to do so. Sugar refining required a great amount of coal and water – coal was shipped in but, water was a consistent issue. The refinery dug many water wells throughout the neighborhood to maintain the supply that they need to continue production. By 1852, they were refining 7,000,000 pounds (3,200,000 kg) annually and an upgrade to the refinery in 1852 allowed them to increase to 25,000,000 pounds (11,000,000 kg). They employed 200 people by 1854.

=== Sugar Trust ===
In 1887, the Boston Sugar Refinery was named as one of twenty-one sugar refineries in the Sugar Trust. The sugar refiners seized on the benefits of tariffs levied on foreign competition as they had seen done in the oil industry. Through this trust, 98 percent of the United States' sugar market was controlled. The trust was brought to court.

The government decided to sue in Pennsylvania federal court, alleging that the combinations were designed to restrain trade and create a monopoly in the sale and manufacturing of sugar. But the lower court didn't agree and the government appealed up to the Supreme Court.

This was the first prosecution brought in front of the Supreme Court under the Sherman Act.
