= Zuckerraffinerie Braunschweig =

Beet sugar refinery in Germany

Coordinates: 52.2560°N 10.5148°E

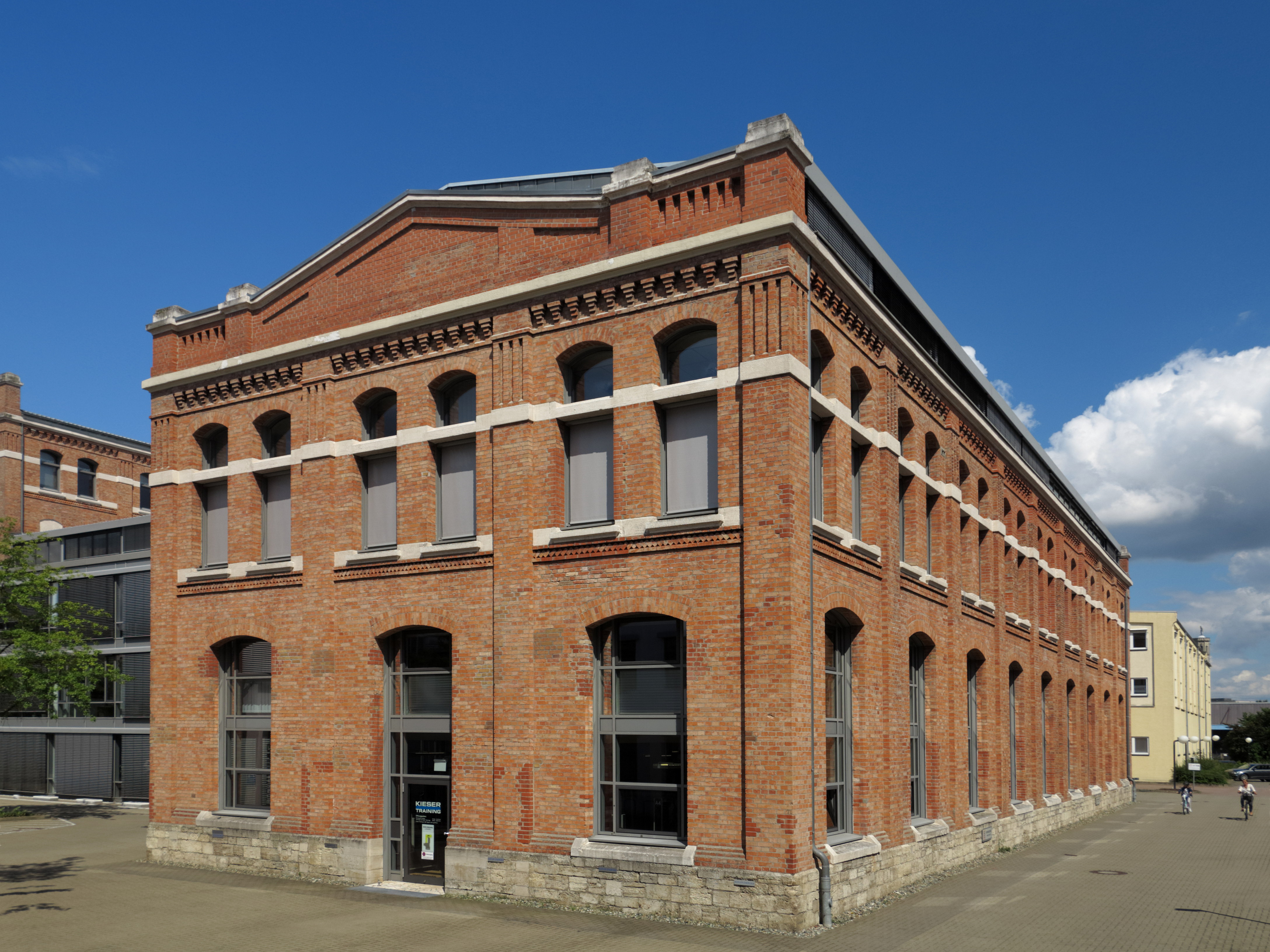
- A restored part of the refinery
- Industry: Sugar refining
- Founded: 1858
- Defunct: 1939
- Headquarters: Braunschweig, Germany
- Products: White sugar

The Zuckerraffinerie Braunschweig was a beet sugar refinery. Its early 20th century brick building on Frankfurter Straße in Braunschweig has been declared industrial heritage. Since 1996 it is part of the business center Artmax and houses offices and other commercial facilities.

== History ==
=== As Zuckerraffinerie Braunschweig ===
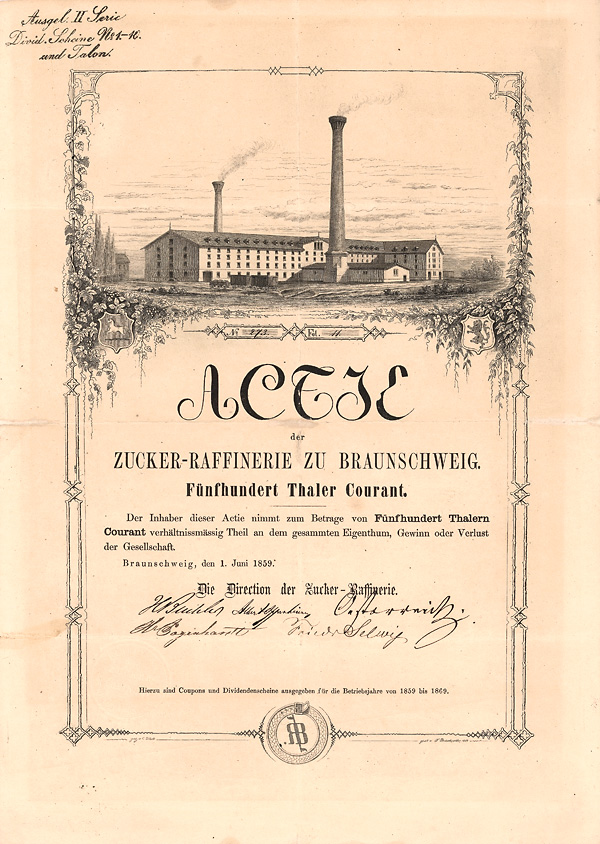
Share of the refinery

In 1857 a group of businessmen from Braunschweig formed a consortium to found a sugar refinery for beet sugar. The group consisted of: Hermann Buchler of Chinifabrik Buchler & Co.; Banker Albert Oppenheimer; City councilor Friedrich Seele, owner of Wullbrandt & Seele; Wholesale sugar trader Friedrich Selwig of Grassau & Son; Manufacturer H. Pagenhardt; and former Landessyndikus J.W. Oesterreich.

The goal of the limited company Zucker-Raffinerie zu Braunschweig was buying sugar, and processing and selling sugar and sugar products. Capital amounted to 500,000 Taler, consisting of 500 shares of 500 Taler and 500 5% bonds.

During 1858 a large number of sugar factories were founded in Braunschweig and surroundings. This was of course related to contracting to sell raw beet sugar to the refinery. The sugar refinery on Frankfurter Straße in Braunschweig was designed and built by Constantin Uhde, who also designed the printed shares. In mid-April 1859 the refinery startet to operate. During the season, it processed about 2,000 cwt of raw beet sugar per day.

During the 1879 crisis in the German sugar industry, the company came in serious financial trouble. The company was then acquired by a new limited company which continued the business as 'Zuckerraffinerie Braunschweig' (slightly revised name with concatenation Zuckerraffinerie). Gustav Seeliger of Bank Seeliger from Wolfenbüttel became the president of its supervisory board.

In September 1900, the refinery burned down completely. In March 1902 a new, larger refinery in the latest brick style was completed. It had been designed by the architects Rasche & Kratzsch.

In 1922 the share capital was increased from 1,560,000 RM to 13,000,000 RM. In 1924 this was decreased again to 2,015,000 RM. In these times the company suffered from a general crisis in the German sugar industry. In 1927 the majority of shares was acquired by five Braunschweig beet sugar manufacturers (Rohzuckerfabrikanten).

In 1938 the Zuckerraffinerie Hildesheim acquired 90% of the shares. In 1939 it then closed down the refinery in Braunschweig. The machines were dismantled and sold.

=== World War II ===
In World War II, the company Luther-Werke used the buildings to produce for the defense industry. The buildings were also used to house Soviet prisoners of war. The buildings were only lightly damaged during the war.

=== Braunschweiger Metallverpackungsgesellschaft ===
After World War II, the buildings became home to the Braunschweiger Metallverpackungsgesellschaft.

=== Industrial heritage ===
The demolition of the buildings had already been planned when on 24 September 1986 they were designated as monuments under the Niedersächsisches Denkmalschutzgesetz. The city of Braunschweig then facilitated the move of the Braunschweiger Metallverpackungsgesellschaft to a new location in the vicinity of Braunschweig Harbor.

In the 1990s the city began discussions about redevelopment of the terrain with the Braunschweig University of Art, but in the mid-1990s both the city and the art academy rejected the plans for an Art and Design center..

=== Artmax ===
In 1996 the businessman Stephan Körber acquired the buildings and began to transform them into Artmax. In 1999 the renovation of the original brick halls started. Some modern extension were added to the buildings. In 2002 the works were finished, and on 12 August the renovated and expanded buildings of the Zuckerraffinerie and the Braunschweiger Metallverpackungsgesellschaft were re-opened as Artmax. This consists of eight buildings for offices and houses about 80 businesses.
