= Abram Lyle =

Sugar refiner and politician

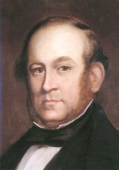
- Born: 14 December 1820; Greenock, Renfrewshire, Scotland
- Died: 30 April 1891 (aged 70)
- Occupations: Sugar refiner and ship owner
- Known for: Tate & Lyle

Provost of Greennock
- In office 1876–1879

Abram Lyle (14 December 1820 – 30 April 1891) was a Scottish food manufacturer and politician, who is noted for founding the sugar refiners Abram Lyle & Sons in 1887, which merged with the company of his rival Henry Tate to become Tate & Lyle in 1921.

== Early life ==
He was born on 14 December 1820 in the seaport of Greenock, Renfrewshire, in Scotland, and at twelve years old became an apprentice in a lawyer's office. He then joined his father's cooperage businesses and in partnership with a friend, John Kerr, developed a shipping business, making the Lyle fleet one of the largest in Greenock. The area was heavily involved in the sugar trade with the West Indies, and his business included transporting sugar.

== Sugar refining ==
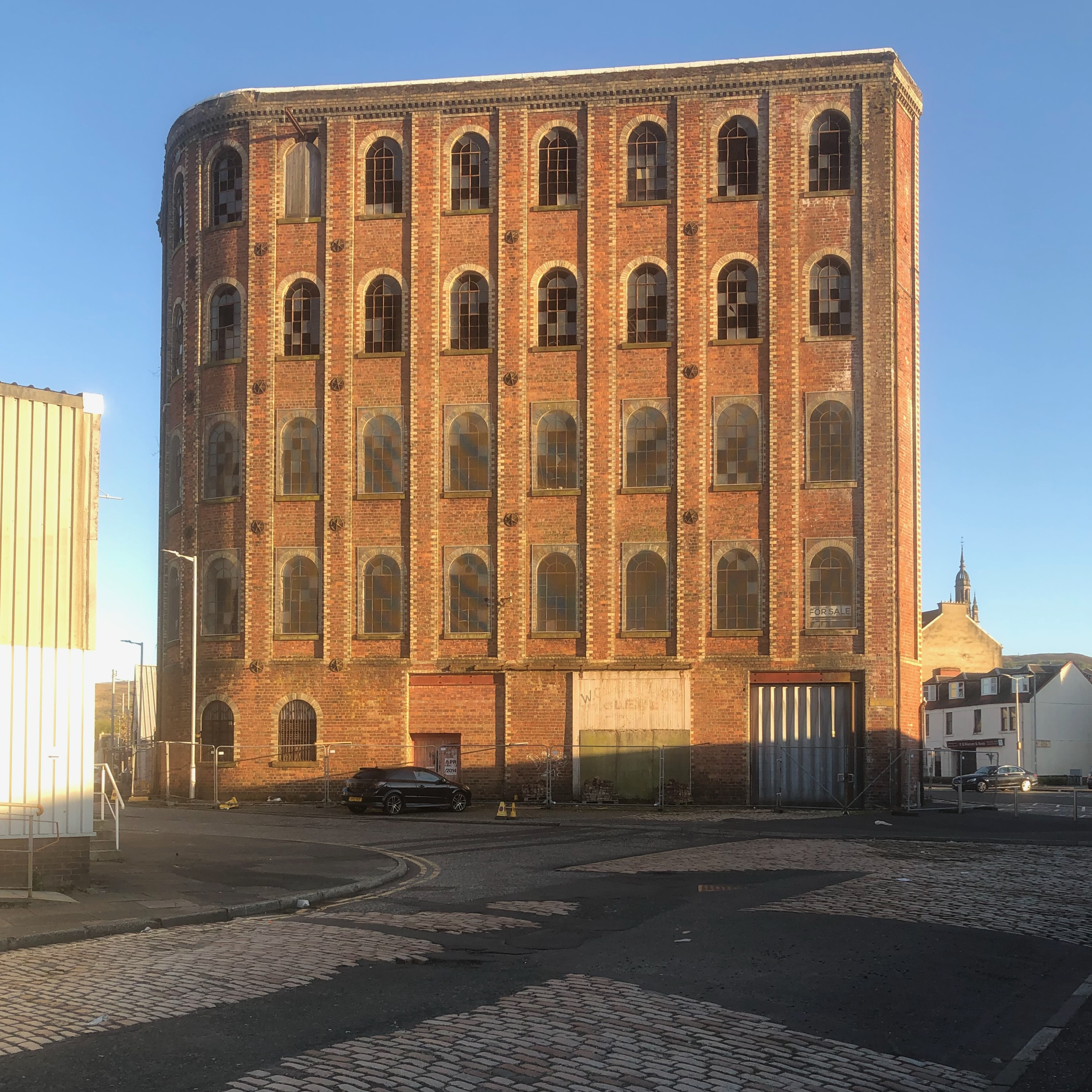
Late 19th-century extension to the Glebe Sugar Refinery, Ker Street, Greenock, where Lyle took up the business. The original sugarhouse was on the left, now the site of an Aldi supermarket (Note: Located at 55.953065°N 4.76269°W)

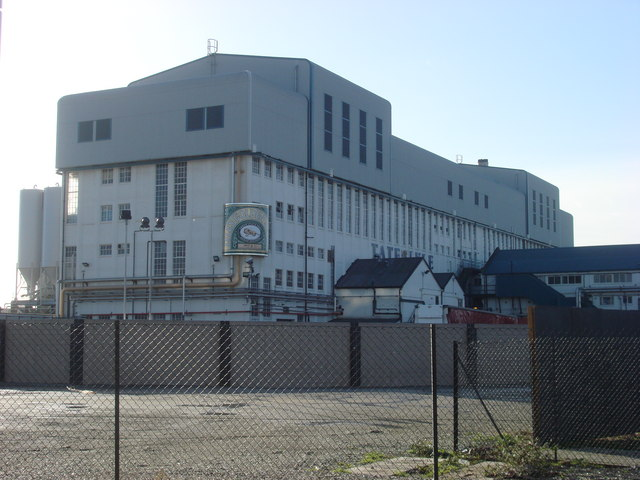
Tate & Lyle syrup refinery at Plaistow Wharf, 2009

Together with four partners he purchased the sugar house of the defunct Greenock Sugar Refining Company in 1865, forming the Glebe Sugar Refinery Company, and so added sugar refining to his other business interests. When John Kerr, the principal partner, died in 1872, Lyle sold his shares and began the search for a site for a new refinery.

Together with his three sons he bought two wharves at Plaistow in East London in 1881 to construct a refinery for producing golden syrup. The site happened to be around 1.5 miles (2.4 km) from the sugar refinery of his rival, Henry Tate. In the first year Lyle's refinery showed a loss of £30,000, with economies being made by asking staff to wait for their wages on occasion, but eventually the business came to dominate the United Kingdom market for golden syrup. Lyle Park, near the site of the syrup refinery at Plaistow Wharf, West Silvertown, was named after him.

The brand, sold in a distinctive green and gold lidded tin with an image of a lion surrounded by bees, is believed to be Britain's oldest. The design of the tin decoration, which includes a biblical quotation, has remained almost unchanged since 1885. In 2024, the brand introduced a new logo for bottles of the syrup, with a visual identity designed to "refresh the brand's legacy to appeal to a 21st century audience", but canned syrup still has the original logo.

Sugar refineries belonging to Tate & Lyle continued as a major industry in Greenock (but with difficulties) until the 1980s, then declining sugar consumption and a shift away from cane sugar led to closure of the last refinery in 1997. There is still a warehouse that was used in the past to store sugar in the town's Greenock Ocean Terminal.

== Personal life and public office ==
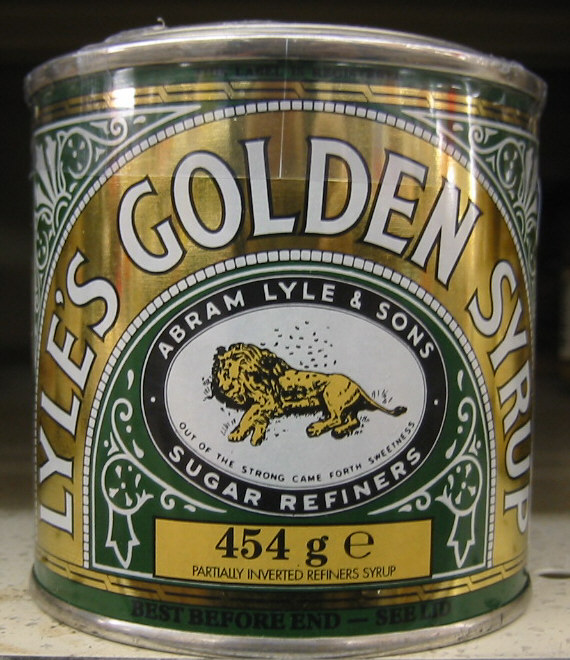
A tin of Lyle's Golden Syrup, first sold in 1885. Recognised by Guinness World Records as having the world's oldest branding and packaging.

Lyle was the son of Abram Lyle and Mary Campbell. He married Mary Park, daughter of William Park, on 14 December 1846 and the couple had five sons and one daughter:

- Abram Lyle (6 October 1847)
- Sir Alexander Park Lyle, 1st Bt., (2 August 1849 – 10 December 1933)
- Charles Lyle, (1851 – 13 June 1929)
- Mary Lyle (1 March 1855 – 6 April 1927)
- John Lyle (9 March 1857)
- Sir Robert Park Lyle, 1st and last Bt., (17 October 1859 – 11 July 1923)

An elder of St Michael's Presbyterian Church in Greenock, Lyle himself chose the biblical quotation for the syrup tins. He was a pious man and a strict teetotaller, who once declared that he would "rather see a son of his carried home dead than drunk".

Lyle was Provost of Greenock from 1876 to 1879. In late 1878, to help the unemployed during the Long Depression, the Police Board provided work building a scenic road to a viewpoint known as the Craigs or Bingens. In January 1879 the Streets Committee named it Lyle Road, and after it was formally opened on 1 May 1880, the name Lyle Hill came into use.

Lyle died on 30 April 1891. He has a large memorial in Greenock Cemetery.

== Notes ==
Footnotes

Citations
